= Corn ethanol =

Ethanol produced from corn biomass

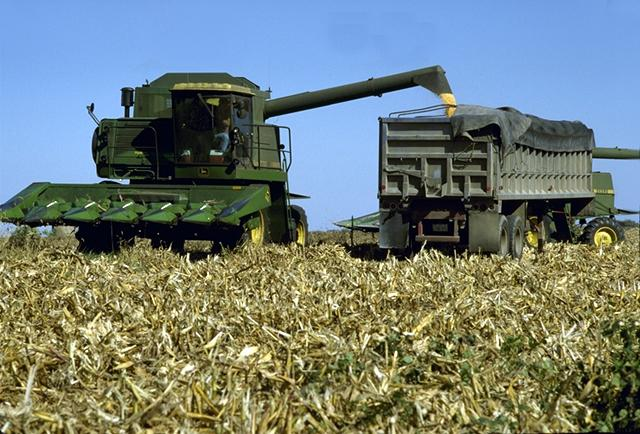
Corn is the main feedstock used for producing ethanol fuel in the United States.

Corn ethanol is ethanol produced from corn biomass and is the main source of ethanol fuel in the United States, mandated to be blended with gasoline in the Renewable Fuel Standard. Corn ethanol is produced by ethanol fermentation and distillation. Production and use of corn ethanol results in lower greenhouse gas emissions because it closes the carbon cycle compared to the dysequilibrium of fossil fuel combustion. Approximately 45% of U.S. corn use is for ethanol production.

== Uses ==
Since 2001, corn ethanol production has increased by more than several times. Out of 9.50 billions of bushels of corn produced in 2001, 0.71 billions of bushels were used to produce corn ethanol. Compared to 2018, out of 14.62 billions of bushels of corn produced, 5.60 billion bushels were used to produce corn ethanol, reported by the United States Department of Energy. Overall, 94% of ethanol in the United States is produced from corn.

Currently, corn ethanol is mainly used in blends with gasoline to create mixtures such as E10, E15, and E85. Ethanol is mixed into more than 98% of United States gasoline to reduce Air pollution Corn ethanol is used as an oxygenate when mixed with gasoline. E10 and E15 can be used in all engines without modification. However, blends like E85, with a much greater ethanol content, require significant modifications to be made before an engine can run on the mixture without damaging the engine. Some vehicles that currently use E85 fuel, also called flex fuel, include, the Ford Focus, Dodge Durango, and Toyota Tundra, among others.

The future use of corn ethanol as a main gasoline replacement is unknown. Corn ethanol has yet to be proven to be as cost effective as gasoline due to corn ethanol being much more expensive to create compared to gasoline. Corn ethanol has to go through an extensive milling process before it can be used as a fuel source. One major drawback with corn ethanol, is the energy returned on energy invested (EROI), meaning the energy outputted in comparison to the energy required to output that energy. Compared to oil, with an 11:1 EROI, corn ethanol has a much lower EROI of 1.5:1, which, in turn, also provides less mileage per gallon compared to gasoline. In the future, as technology advances and oil becomes less abundant, the process of milling may require less energy, resulting in an EROI closer to that of oil. Another serious problem with corn ethanol as a replacement for gasoline, is the engine damage on standard vehicles. E10 contains ten percent ethanol and is acceptable for most vehicles on the road today, while E15 contains fifteen percent ethanol and is usually prohibited for cars built before 2001. However, with the hope to replace gasoline in the future, E85, which contains 85% ethanol, requires engine modification before an engine can last while processing a high volume of ethanol for an extended period of time. Therefore, most older and modern day vehicles would become obsolete without proper engine modifications to handle the increase in corrosiveness from the high volume of ethanol. Also, most gas stations do not offer refueling of E85 vehicles. The United States Department of Energy reports that only 3,355 gas stations, out of 168,000, across the United States, offer ethanol refueling for E85 vehicles.

Beyond its role as a transportation fuel, ethanol from corn can be dehydrated to ethylene or coprocessed in fluid catalytic cracking units. A 2025 cradle to gate life cycle assessment reported lower greenhouse gas emissions for such bioethylene pathways than for fossil-derived ethylene production. In this pathway, ethanol is catalytically dehydrated to produce ethylene, a key feedstock for polyethylene and other plastics. Under certain configurations, life cycle modeling found that bioethylene from corn ethanol could achieve more than a 100% reduction in greenhouse gas emissions compared to fossil derived ethylene, due to coproduct credits and carbon capture. The study also examined coprocessing ethanol with petroleum derived feedstocks in refinery units to produce renewable gasoline blendstocks, finding this pathway could achieve significant greenhouse gas savings relative to conventional refining.

== Production process ==
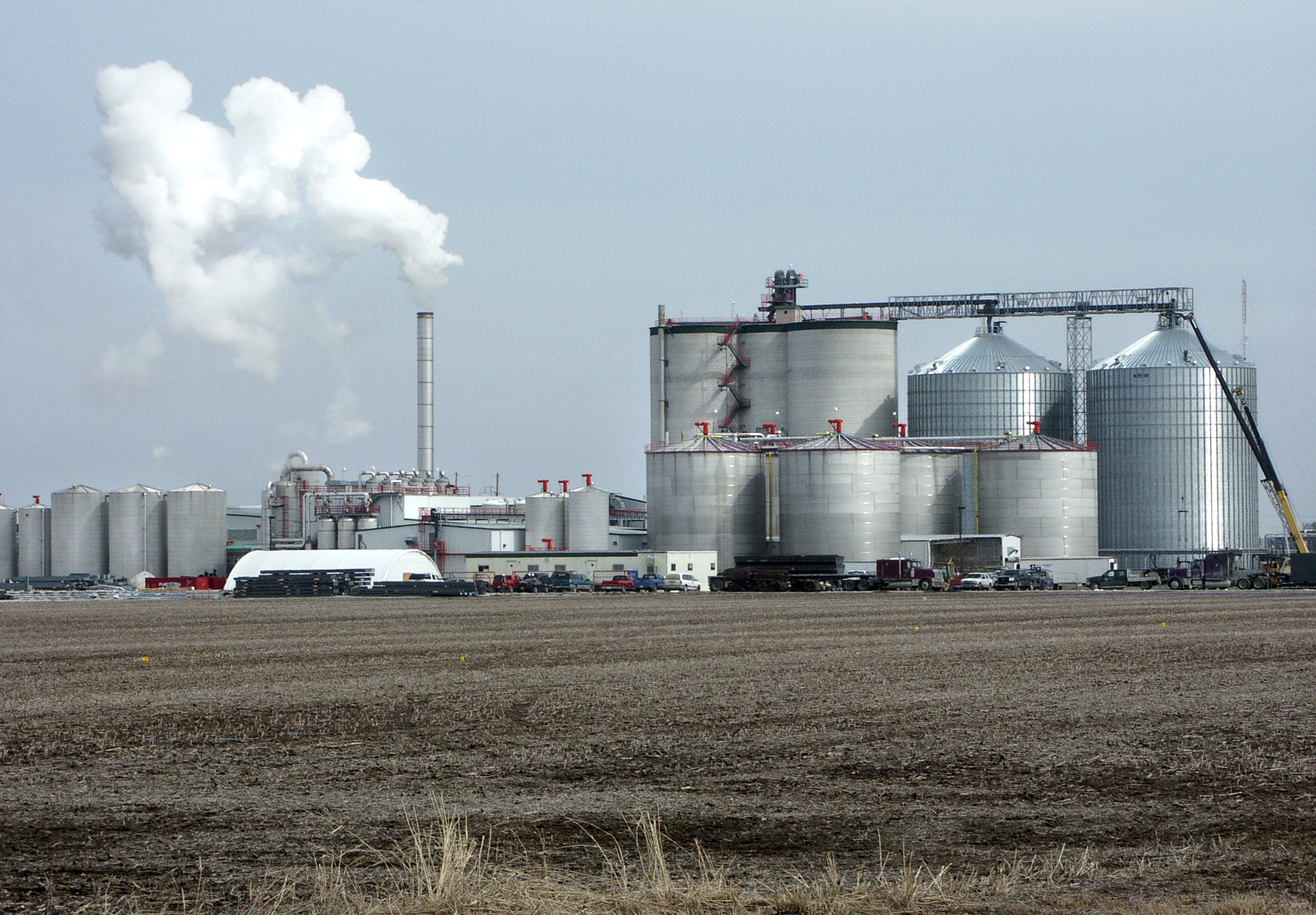
An ethanol fuel plant in West Burlington, Iowa.

Biofuels can be produced through biological or thermochemical routes, with bioethanol among the most common. Recent plant upgrades have incorporated energy saving measures such as heat integration, improved distillation efficiency, and advanced enzymes that increase starch to ethanol conversion rates. Examples of such measures include replacing natural gas with biomass derived syngas, installing combined heat and power systems, and capturing CO₂ from fermentation or distillation. There are two main types of corn ethanol production: dry milling and wet milling, which differ in the initial grain treatment method and co-products.

=== Dry milling ===
The vast majority (≈90%) of corn ethanol in the United States is produced by dry milling. In the dry milling process, the entire corn kernel is ground into flour, or "mash," which is then slurried by adding water. Enzymes are added to the mash to hydrolyze the starch into simple sugars. Ammonia is added to control the pH and as a nutrient for the yeast, which is added later. The mixture is processed at high temperatures to reduce the bacteria levels. The mash is transferred and cooled in fermenters. Yeast are added, which ferment the sugars into ethanol and carbon dioxide. The entire process takes 40 to 50 hours, during which time the mash is kept cool and agitated to promote yeast activity. The mash is then transferred to distillation columns, where the ethanol is removed from the silage. The ethanol is dehydrated to about 200 proof using a molecular sieve system. A denaturant such as gasoline is added to render the product undrinkable. The product is then ready to ship to gasoline retailers or terminals. The remaining silage is processed into a highly nutritious livestock feed known as distiller's dried grains and solubles (DDGS). The carbon dioxide released from the process can be used to carbonate beverages and to manufacture dry ice .

=== Wet milling ===
In wet milling, the corn grain is separated into components by steeping in dilute sulfurous acid for 24 to 48 hours. The slurry mix then goes through a series of grinders to separate out the corn germ. The remaining components of fiber, gluten, and starch are segregated using screen, hydroclonic, and centrifugal separators. The corn starch and remaining water can be fermented into ethanol through a similar process as dry milling, dried and sold as modified corn starch, or made into corn syrup. The gluten protein and steeping liquor are dried to make a corn gluten meal that is sold to the livestock industry. The heavy steep water is also sold as a feed ingredient and used as an alternative to salt in the winter months. Corn oil is also extracted and sold.

== Environmental issues ==
Corn based ethanol is classified as a first generation biofuel produced from edible crops; later generations derive from lignocellulosic feedstocks or algae. Corn ethanol results in lower greenhouse gas emissions than gasoline and is fully biodegradable, unlike some fuel additives such as MTBE. However, because energy to run many U.S. distilleries comes mainly from coal plants, there has been considerable debate on the sustainability of corn ethanol in replacing fossil fuels. Additional controversy relates to the large amount of arable land required for crops and its impact on grain supply and direct and indirect land use change effects. Other issues relate to pollution, water use for irrigation and processing, energy balance, and emission intensity for the full life cycle of ethanol production.

=== Greenhouse gas emissions ===
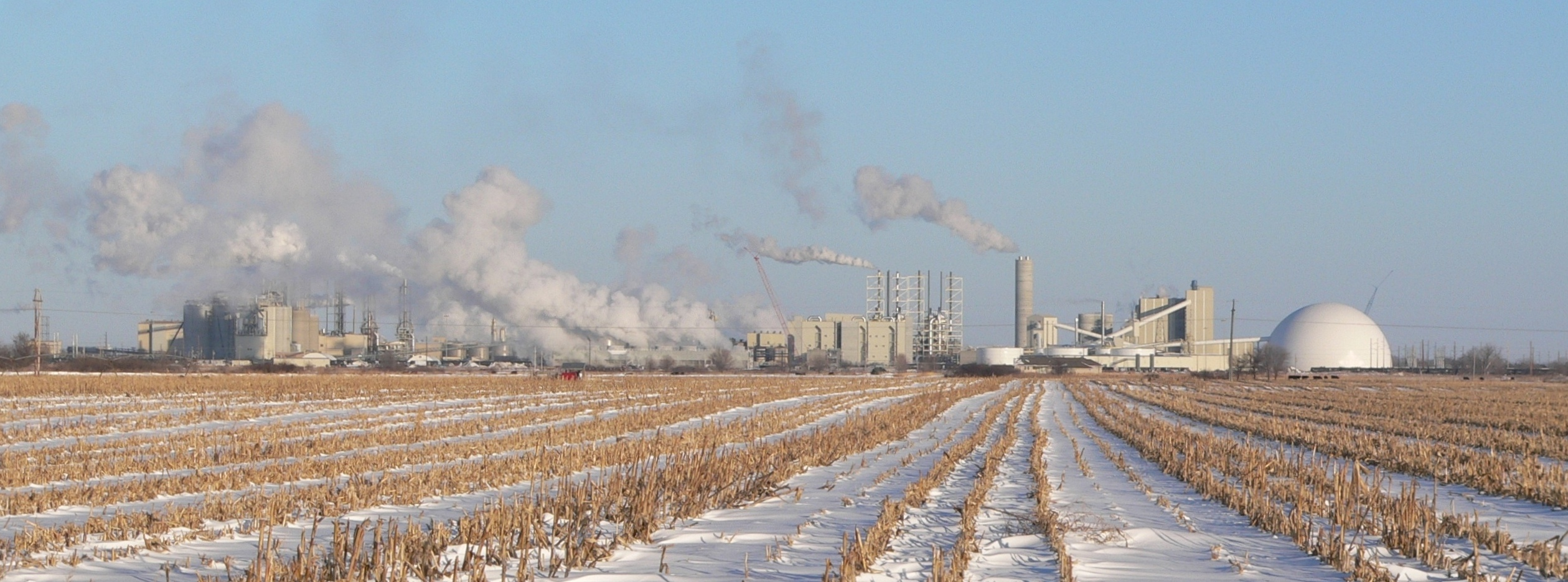
Corn-processing plant near Columbus, Nebraska.

Several full life cycle studies have found that corn ethanol reduces well-to-wheel greenhouse gas emissions by up to 50 percent compared to gasoline. A 2022 life cycle analysis led by Argonne National Laboratory estimated the current U.S. corn ethanol carbon intensity at about 52.4 g CO₂e/MJ. The study found that combining efficiency measures, fuel switching (e.g., syngas or renewable natural gas in place of natural gas), and carbon capture could reduce carbon intensity to as low as −18.4 g CO₂e/MJ, including land use change. The analysis also accounted for credits from co products such as distillers dried grains with solubles (DDGS), which displace conventional animal feed and thereby reduce overall life cycle greenhouse gas emissions. However, more recent research based on an analysis of data from the first eight years of the US Renewable Fuel Standard's implementation suggests that corn ethanol produces more carbon emissions per unit of energy than gasoline, when factoring in fertilizer use and land use change.

Ethanol-blended fuels currently in the market – whether E10 or E85 – meet stringent tailpipe emission standards.

=== Croplands and land use ===
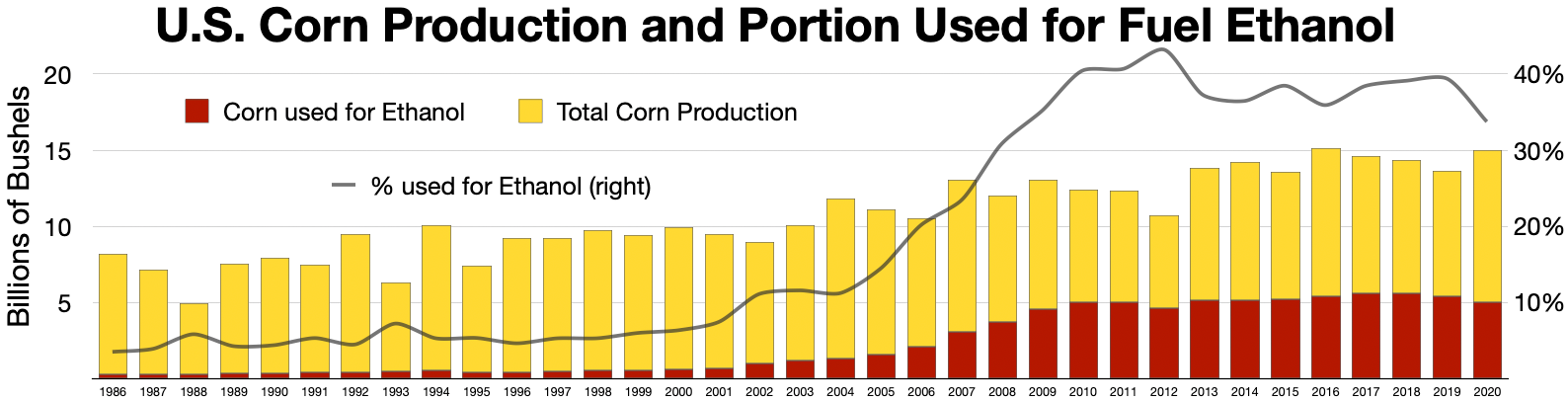
Corn vs ethanol production in the United States Total corn production (bushels) (left) Corn used for ethanol fuel (bushels) (left) Percent of corn used for Ethanol (right)

One of the main controversies involving corn ethanol production is the necessity for arable cropland to grow the corn for ethanol, which is then not available to grow corn for human or animal consumption. In the United States, 40% of the acreage designated for corn grain is used for corn ethanol production, of which 25% was converted to ethanol after accounting for co-products, leaving only 60% of the crop yield for human or animal consumption.

Growing corn to fuel internal combustion vehicles is a highly inefficient use of land. A solar farm generating electricity to power an electric vehicle would power around 85 times as much distance as corn ethanol grown on the same area.

== Economic impact of corn ethanol ==
The Renewable Fuels Association (RFA), the ethanol industry's lobbying group, claims that ethanol production increases the price of corn by increasing demand. The RFA claims that ethanol production has positive economic effect for US farmers, but it does not elaborate on the effect for other populations where field corn is part of the staple diet. An RFA lobby document states that "In a January 2007 statement, the USDA Chief Economist stated that farm program payments were expected to be reduced by some $6 billion due to the higher value of a bushel of corn. Corn production in 2009 reached over 13.2 billion bushels, and a per acre yield jumped to over 165 bushels per acre. In the United States, 5.05 billion bushels of corn were used for ethanol production out of 14.99 billion bushels produced in 2020, according to USDA data. According to the U.S. Department of Energy's Alternative Fuels Data Center, "The increased ethanol [production] seems to have come from the increase in overall corn production and a small decrease in corn used for animal feed and other residual uses. The amount of corn used for other uses, including human consumption, has stayed fairly consistent from year to year." This does not prove there was not an impact on food supplies: Since U.S. corn production doubled (approximately) between 1987 and 2018, it is probable that some cropland previously used to grow other food crops is now used to grow corn. It is also possible or probable that some marginal land has been converted or returned to agricultural use. That may have negative environmental impacts.

== Alternative biomass for ethanol ==
Remnants from food production such as corn stover could be used to produce ethanol instead of food corn. Ethanol derived from Sugar-beet as used in Europe or Sugarcane in Brazil has up to 80% reduction in well-to-wheel carbon dioxide. The use of cellulosic biomass to produce ethanol is considered second generation biofuel that are considered by some to be a solution to the food versus fuel debate, and has the potential to cut life cycle greenhouse gas emissions by up to 86 percent relative to gasoline.

== See also ==
- Ethanol fuel
- Ethanol fuel in the United States
