= Motor vehicle =

Self-propelled wheeled or tracked vehicle

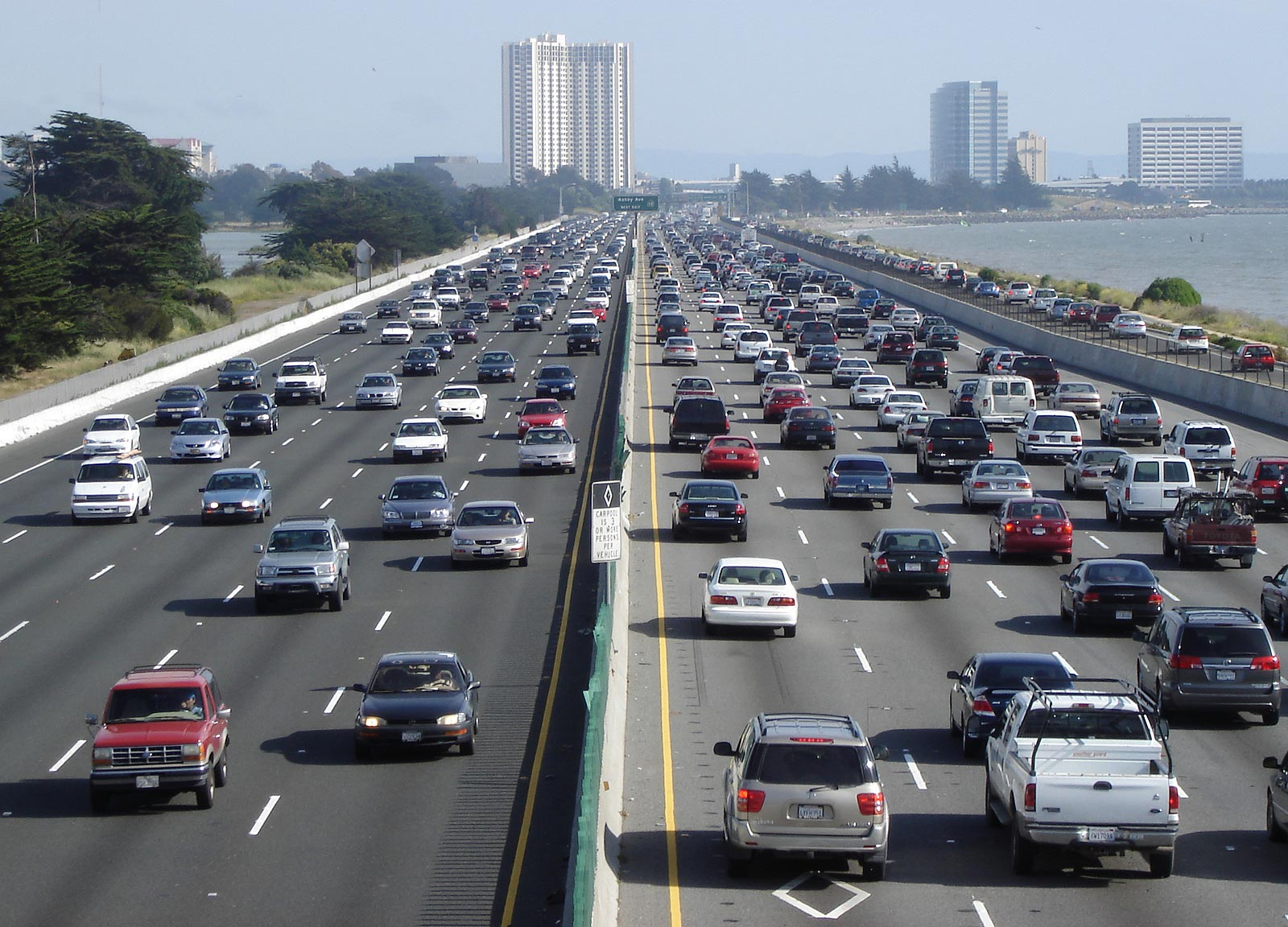
The United States has one of the world's highest rates of vehicle ownership per capita in the world, with 850 vehicles in operation (VIO) per 1000 people in 2022.

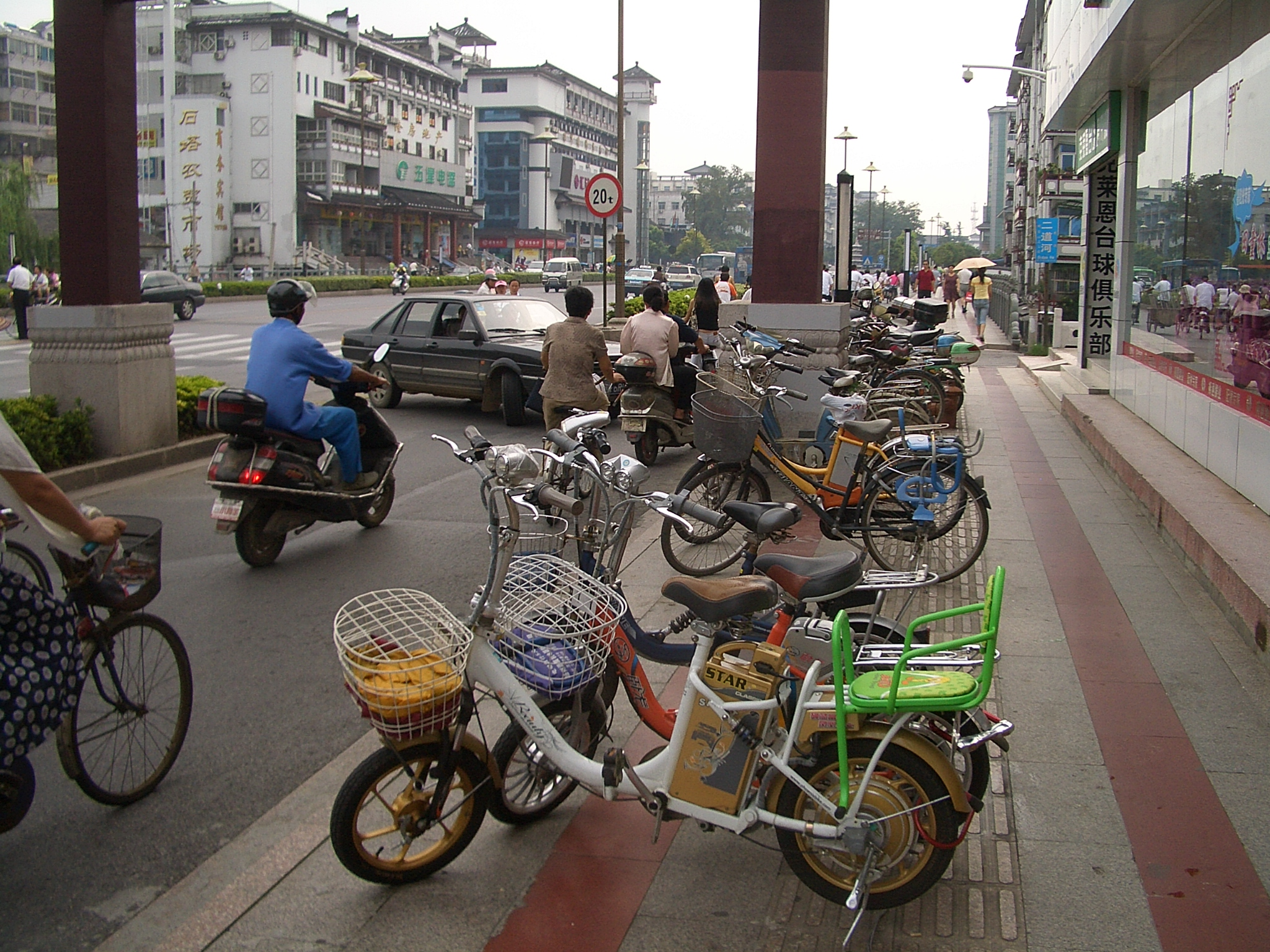
Electric bicycles parked in Yangzhou's main street, Wenchang Lu. They are a very common form of transport in this city, in some areas almost outnumbering regular bicycles.

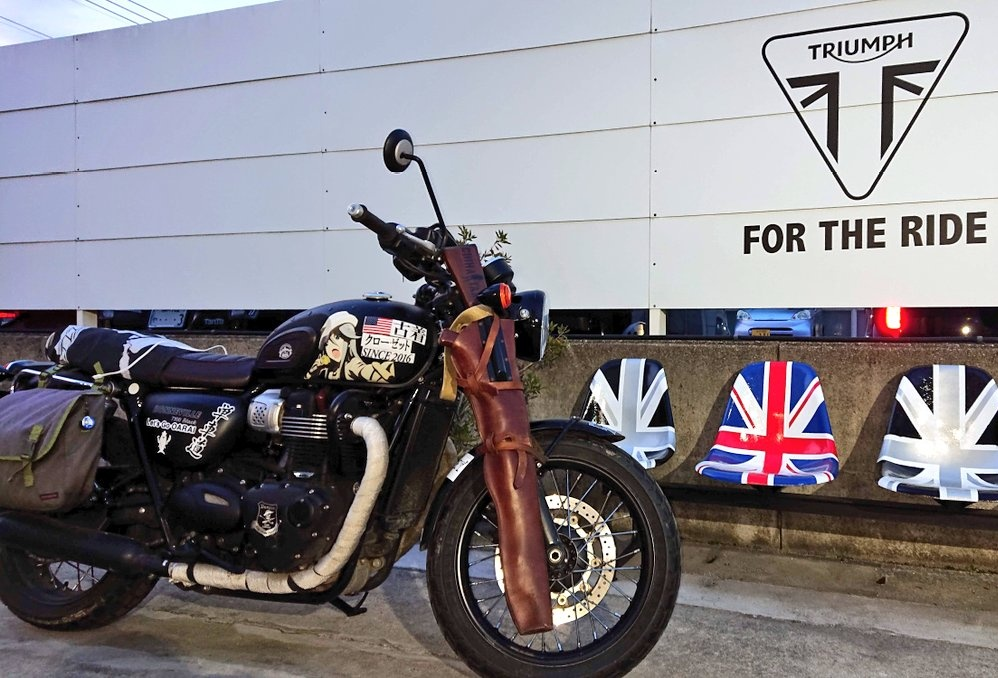
British motorcycle manufacturer

A motor vehicle, also known as a motorized vehicle, automotive vehicle, automobile, or road vehicle, is a self-propelled land vehicle, commonly wheeled, that does not operate on rails (such as trains or trams), does not fly (such as airplanes or helicopters), does not float on water (such as boats or ships), and is used for the transportation of people or cargo.

The vehicle propulsion is provided by an engine or motor, usually a gasoline/diesel internal combustion engine or an electric traction motor, or some combination of the two as in hybrid electric vehicles and plug-in hybrid vehicles. For legal purposes, motor vehicles are often identified within many vehicle classes, including cars, buses, motorcycles, off-road vehicles, light trucks, and regular trucks. These classifications vary according to the legal codes of each country. ISO 3833:1977 is the standard for road vehicle types, terms, and definitions. Typically, to avoid requiring people with disabilities from having to possess an operator's license to use one, or requiring tags and insurance, powered wheelchairs are specifically excluded by law from being considered motor vehicles.

As of 2011, there were more than one billion motor vehicles in use in the world, excluding off-road vehicles and heavy construction equipment. The US publisher Ward's estimates that as of 2019, there were 1.4 billion motor vehicles in use in the world. And now according to the International Organization of Motor Vehicle Manufacturers (OICA), the global number of motor vehicles in use reached around 1.55 billion by 2023, reflecting steady growth driven by rising ownership in Asia and Africa.

Global vehicle ownership per capita in 2010 was 148 vehicles in operation (VIO) per 1000 people. By the end of 2024, China's total number of registered motor vehicles surpassed 440 million, including more than 36 million new energy vehicles, according to data from the Ministry of Public Security of China. The United States has the highest vehicle ownership per capita in the world, with 832 vehicles in operation per 1000 people in 2016. Also, China became the world's largest new car market in 2009. In 2022, a total of 85 million cars and commercial vehicles were built, led by China, which built a total of 27 million motor vehicles.

== Definitions and terminology ==
In 1968, the Vienna Convention on Road Traffic gave one of the first international definitions of a motor vehicle:

- (o) "Power-driven vehicle" means any self-propelled road vehicle, other than a moped in the territories of Contracting Parties which do not treat mopeds as motorcycles, and other than a rail-borne vehicle;
- (p) "Motor vehicle" means any power-driven vehicle which is normally used for carrying persons or goods by road or for drawing, on the road, vehicles used for the carriage of persons or goods. This term embraces trolley-buses, that is to say, vehicles connected to an electric conductor and not rail-borne. It does not cover vehicles, such as agricultural tractors, which are only incidentally used for carrying persons or goods by road or for drawing, on the road, vehicles used for the carriage of persons or goods

— Vienna Convention on Road Traffic

Other sources might provide different definitions; for instance, in 1977, ISO 3833:1977 provides different definitions.

== Ownership trends ==
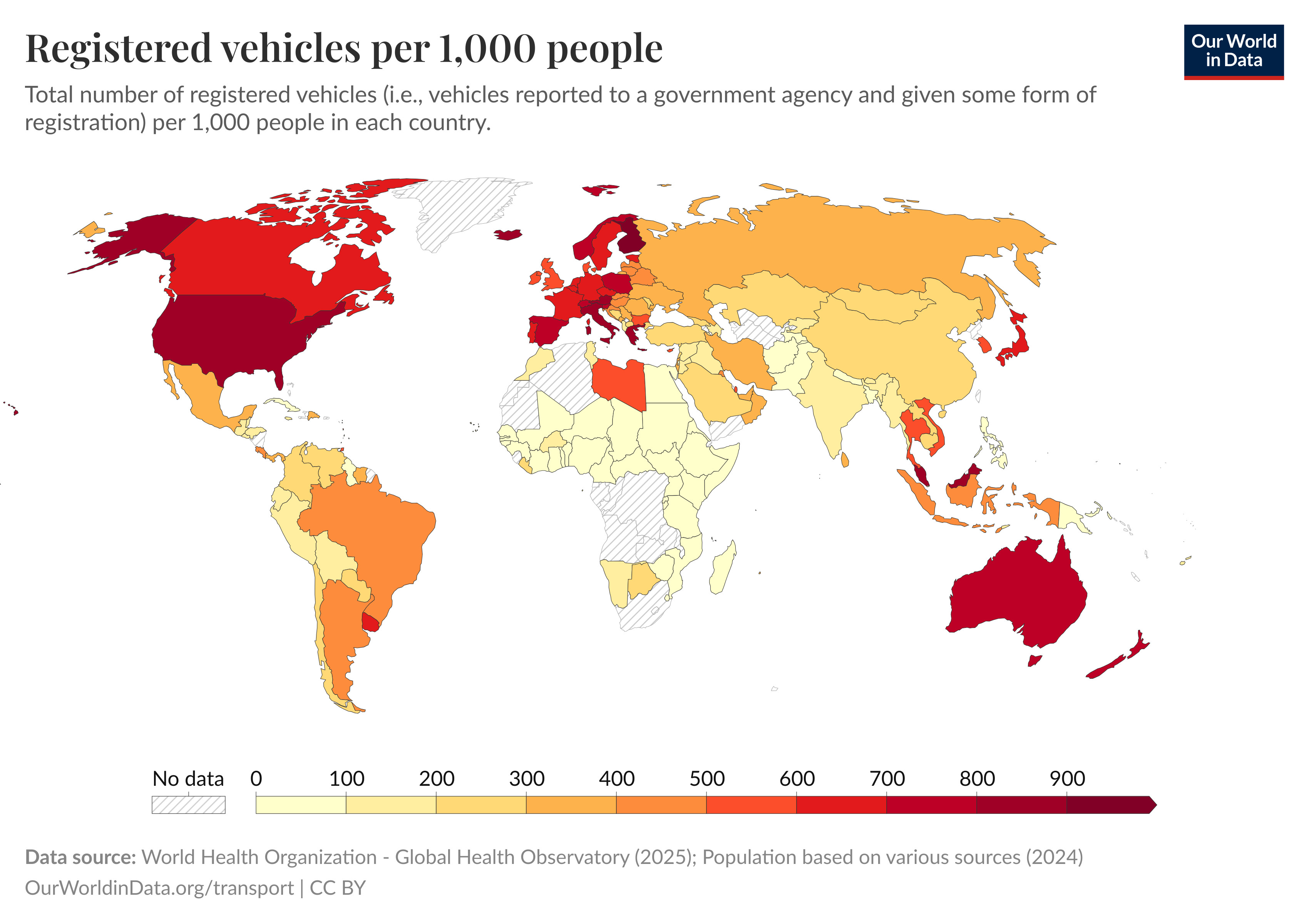
Motor vehicle ownership per 1000 inhabitants in 2014

Trucks' share of U.S. vehicles produced has tripled since 1975. Although vehicle fuel efficiency has increased within each category, the overall trend toward less efficient types of vehicles has offset some of the benefits of greater fuel economy and reduced carbon dioxide emissions. Without the shift towards SUVs, energy use per unit distance could have fallen 30% more than it did from 2010 to 2022.

The U.S. publisher Ward's estimates that, as of 2010, there were 1.015 billion motor vehicles in use worldwide. This figure represents the number of cars, trucks (light, medium, and heavy duty), and buses, but does not include off-road vehicles or heavy construction equipment. The world vehicle population passed the 500 million-unit mark in 1986, from 250 million motor vehicles in 1970. Between 1950 and 1970, the vehicle population doubled roughly every 10 years. Navigant Consulting forecasts that the global stock of light-duty motor vehicles will reach 2 billion units in 2035.

Global vehicle ownership in 2010 was 148 vehicles in operation per 1,000 people, a ratio of 1:6.75 vehicles per person, slightly down from 150 vehicles per 1,000 people in 2009, a rate of 1:6.63 vehicles per person. The global motorization rate increased in 2013 to 174 vehicles per 1000 people. In developing countries vehicle ownership rates rarely exceed 200 cars per 1,000 population.

The following table summarizes the evolution of motor vehicle registrations in the world from 1960 to 2019:

Historical trend of worldwide vehicle registrations 1960-2017 (thousands)
Type of vehicle	1960	1970	1980	1990	2000	2005	2010	2015	2016	2017	2018	2019
Car registrations^{(1)}	98,305	193,479	320,390	444,900	548,558	617,914	723,567	931,260	973,353	1,015,643	1,042,274	1,083,528
Truck and bus registrations	28,583	52,899	90,592	138,082	203,272	245,798	309,395	332,434	348,919	356,044	389,174	406,770
World total	126,888	246,378	410,982	582,982	751,830	863,712	1,032,962	1,263,694	1,322,272	1,371,687	1,431,448	1,490,298
Note (1) Car registrations do not include U.S. light trucks (SUVs, minivans, and pickups) that are used for personal travel. The US accounts for these vehicles among trucks.

Alternative fuels and vehicle technology adoption

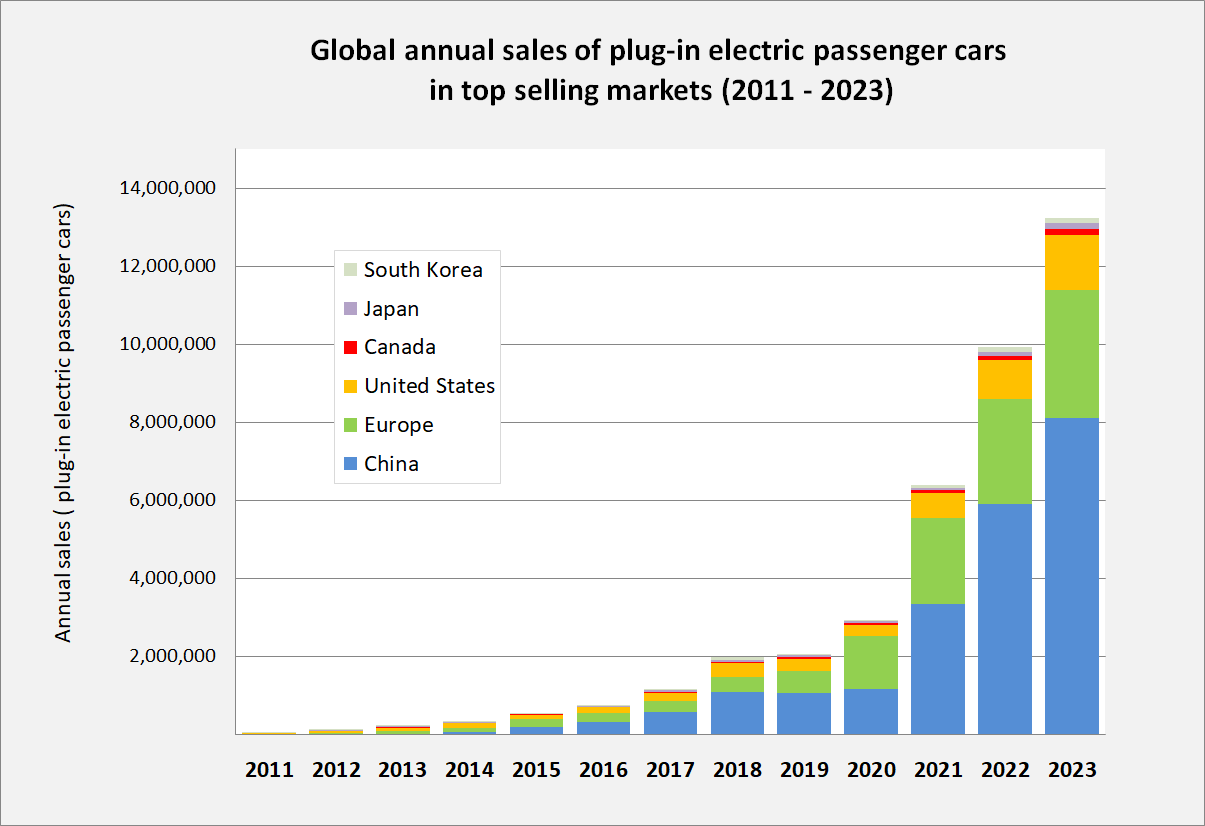
Annual sales of plug-in passenger cars in the world's top markets between 2011 and 2023

Since the early 2000s, the number of alternative fuel vehicles has been increasing, driven by several governments' interest in promoting their widespread adoption through public subsidies and other non-financial incentives. Governments have adopted these policies due to a combination of factors, including environmental concerns, high oil prices, and a lower dependence on imported oil.

Among the fuels other than traditional petroleum fuels (gasoline or diesel fuel), and alternative technologies for powering the engine of a motor vehicle, the most popular options promoted by different governments are: natural gas vehicles, LPG powered vehicles, flex-fuel vehicles, use of biofuels, hybrid electric vehicles, plug-in hybrids, electric cars, and hydrogen fuel cell cars.

Since the late 2000s, China, European countries, the United States, Canada, Japan, and other developed countries have been providing strong financial incentives to promote the adoption of plug-in electric vehicle. As of 2024, the global fleet of plug-in electric vehicles (battery-electric and plug-in hybrids) exceeded 40 million units, with China and Europe accounting for over two-thirds of total sales. As of 2019, in addition, the medium and heavy commercial segments add another 700,000 units to the global stock of plug-in electric vehicles. In 2020, the global market share of plug-in passenger car sales was 4.2%, up from 2.5% in 2019. Nevertheless, despite government support and the rapid growth experienced, the plug-in electric car segment represented just about 1 out of every 250 vehicles (0.4%) on the world's roads by the end of 2018.

=== China ===
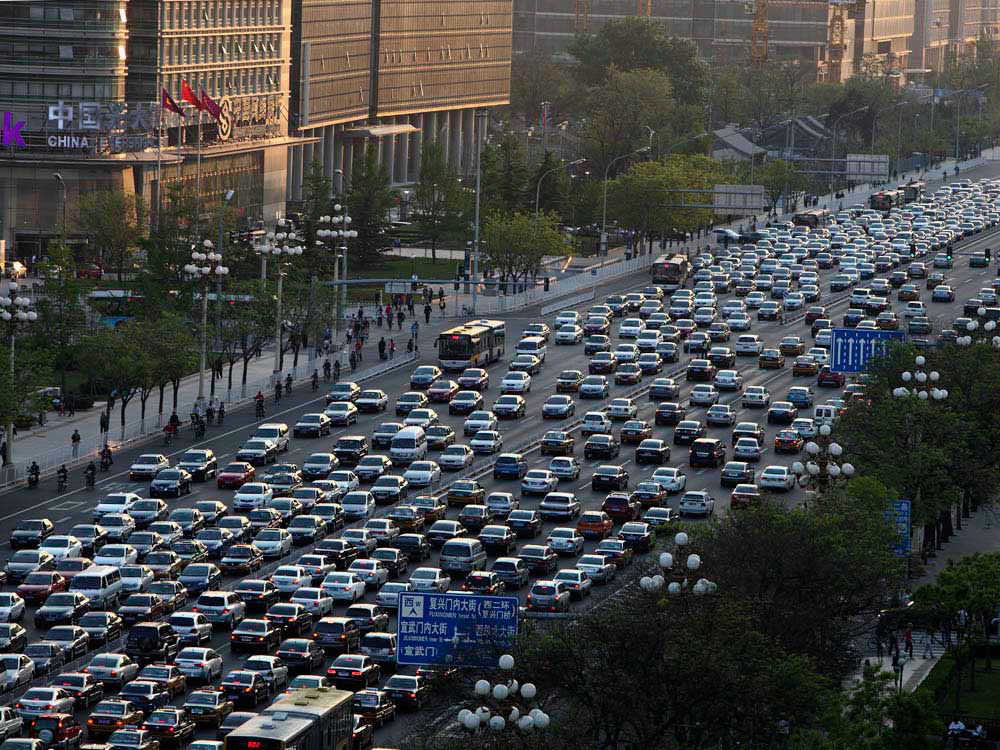
The People's Republic of China became the world's largest new car market in 2009.

The People's Republic of China had 322 million motor vehicles in use at the end of September 2018, of which 235 million were passenger cars, making China the country with the largest motor vehicle fleet in the world. In 2016, the motor vehicle fleet consisted of 165.6 million cars and 28.4 million trucks and buses. About 13.6 million vehicles were sold in 2009, and motor vehicle registrations in 2010 increased to more than 16.8 million units, representing nearly half the world's fleet increase in 2010. Ownership per capita rose from 26.6 vehicles per 1000 people in 2006 to 141.2 in 2016.

The stock of highway-legal plug-in electric or new energy vehicles in China totaled 2.21 million units by the end of September 2018, of which 81% are all-electric vehicles. These figures include heavy-duty commercial vehicles, such as buses and sanitation trucks, which account for about 11% of the total stock. China is also the world's largest electric bus market, reaching about 385,000 units by the end of 2017.

The number of cars and motorcycles in China increased by a factor of 20 between 2000 and 2010. This explosive growth has allowed China to become the world's largest new car market, overtaking the US in 2009. Nevertheless, ownership per capita is 58 vehicles per 1000 people, or a ratio of 1:17.2 vehicles to people, still well below the rate of motorization of developed countries.

=== United States ===
Historical evolution of vehicle ownership rates in the U.S. (Selected years 1900–2016)
Year	Veh. per 1000 people	Year	Veh. per 1000 people	Year	Veh. per 1000 people
1900	0.11	1940	245.63	1990	773.4
1905	0.94	1945	221.80	2000	800.3
1910	5.07	1950	323.71	2005	837.3
1920	86.78	1960	410.37	2010	808.4
1930	217.34	1970	545.35	2015	821.5
1935	208.6	1980	710.71	2016	831.9

The United States has the second-largest motor vehicle fleet in the world, after China. As of 2016, had a motor vehicle stock of 259.14 million, of which 246 million were light-duty vehicles, consisting of 112.96 million passenger cars and 133 million light trucks (including SUVs). A total of 11.5 million heavy trucks were registered at the end 2016 Vehicle ownership per capita in the U.S. is also the highest in the world, the U.S. Department of Energy (USDoE) reports a motorization rate of 831.9 vehicles in operation per 1000 people in 2016, or a ratio of 1:1.2 vehicles to people.

According to USDoE, the motorization rate peaked in 2007 at 844.5 vehicles per 1,000 people. In terms of licensed drivers, as of 2009, the country had 1.0 vehicle for every licensed driver, and 1.87 vehicles per household. Passenger car registrations in the United States declined -11.5% in 2017 and -12.8% in 2018.

As of 2016, the stock of alternative fuel vehicles in the United States included over 20 million flex-fuel cars and light trucks, the world's second-largest flexible-fuel fleet in the world after Brazil. However, actual use of ethanol fuel is significantly limited due to the lack of E85 refueling infrastructure.

Regarding the electrified segment, the fleet of hybrid electric vehicles in the United States ranks second in the world, after Japan, with more than 4 million units sold through April 2016. Since the introduction of the Tesla Roadster electric car in 2008, cumulative sales of highway legal plug-in electric vehicles in the United States passed one million units in September 2018. The U.S. stock of plug-in vehicles is the second largest after China (2.21 million by September 2018).

As of 2017, the country's fleet also includes more than 160,000 natural gas vehicles, mainly transit buses and delivery fleets. Despite its relatively small size, natural gas use accounted for about 52% of all alternative fuels consumed by alternative transportation fuel vehicles in the U.S. in 2009.

=== Europe ===
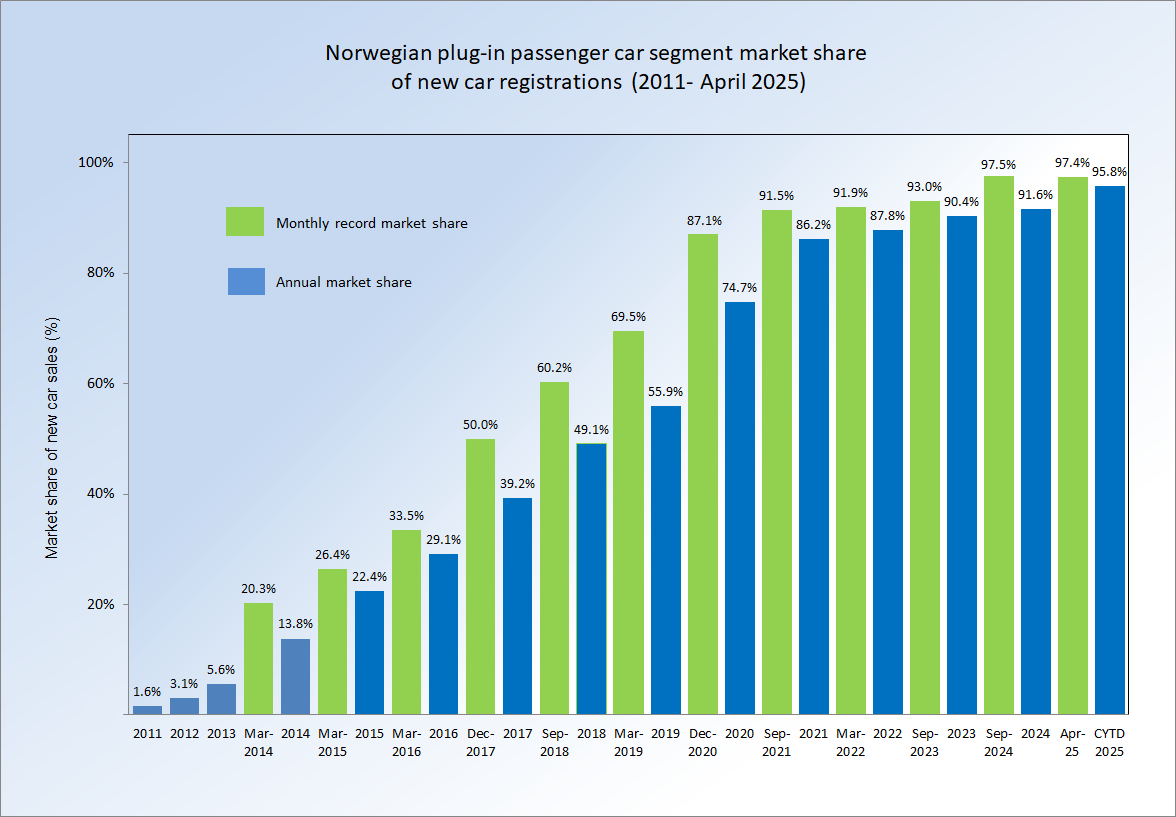
Historical evolution of the Norwegian plug-in electric car segment market share of new car sales and monthly records between 2011 and April 2025. Sources: Norwegian Road Federation (OFV) and Norsk Elbilforening (Norwegian EV Association)

The 27 European Union (EU-27) member countries had a fleet of over 256 million in 2008, and passenger cars accounted for 87% of the union's fleet. The five largest markets, Germany (17.7%), Italy (15.4%), France (13.3%), the UK (12.5%), and Spain (9.5%), accounted for 68% of the region's total registered fleet in 2008. The EU-27 member countries had in 2009 an estimated ownership rate of 473 passenger cars per 1000 people.

According to Ward's, Italy had the second-highest (after the U.S.) vehicle ownership per capita in 2010, with 690 vehicles per 1000 people. Germany had a motorization rate of 534 vehicles per 1000 people, and the UK 525, both in 2008. France had a rate of 575 vehicles per 1000 people, and Spain 608, in 2007. Portugal, between 1991 and 2002, grew its motorization rate by 220%, reaching 560 cars per 1000 people in 2002.

Italy also leads in alternative fuel vehicles, with a fleet of 779,090 natural gas vehicles as of June 2012, the largest NGV fleet in Europe. Sweden, with 225,000 flexible-fuel vehicles, has the largest flexifuel fleet in Europe by mid-2011.

More than one million plug-in electric passenger cars and vans have been registered in Europe by June 2018, the world's second largest regional plug-in stock after China.

Norway is the leading plug-in market in Europe with almost 500,000 units registered as of December 2020. In October 2018, Norway became the world's first country where 10% of all passenger cars on the road are plug-in electrics. Also, the Norwegian plug-in car segment market share has been the highest in the world for several years, achieving 39.2% in 2017, 49.1% in 2018, and 74.7% in 2020.

=== Japan ===
Japan had 73.9 million vehicles by 2010, and had the world's second-largest motor vehicle fleet until 2009. As of 2016, the registered motor vehicle fleet totaled 75.81 million vehicles consisting of 61,40 million cars and 14,41 million trucks and buses. Japan has the largest hybrid electric vehicle fleet in the world. As of March 2018, there were 7.51 million hybrids registered in the country, excluding kei cars, and representing 19.0% of all passenger cars on the road.

=== Brazil ===
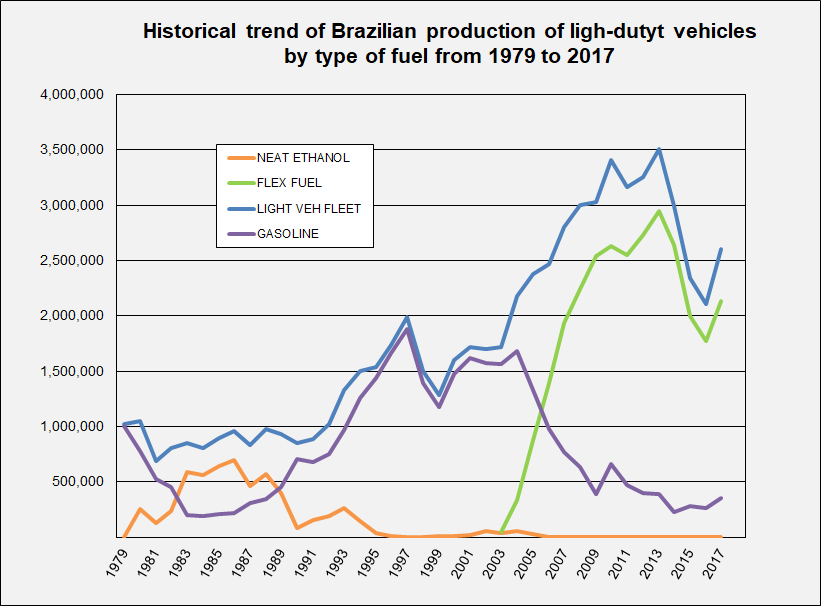
Historical trend of Brazilian production of light-duty vehicles by type of fuel: neat ethanol, flex fuel, and gasoline from 1979 to 2017.

The Brazilian vehicle fleet reached 64.8 million vehicles in 2010, up from 29.5 million units in 2000, representing a 119% increase over ten years and a motorization rate of 340 vehicles per 1000 people. In 2010, Brazil experienced the second-largest fleet increase in the world after China, with 2.5 million vehicle registrations.

As of 2018, Brazil has the largest alternative-fuel vehicle fleet in the world, with about 40 million alternative-fuel motor vehicles on the road. The clean vehicle stock includes 30.5 million flexible-fuel cars and light utility vehicles and over 6 million flex-fuel motorcycles by March 2018; between 2.4 and 3.0 million neat ethanol vehicles still in use, out of 5.7 million ethanol only light-vehicles produced since 1979; and, as of December 2012, a total of 1.69 million natural gas vehicles.

In addition, all the Brazilian gasoline-powered fleet is designed to operate with high ethanol blends, up to 25% ethanol fuel (E25). The market share of flex fuel vehicles reached 88.6% of all light-duty vehicles registered in 2017.

=== India ===
India's vehicle fleet grew at the second-highest rate after China in 2010, at 8.9%. The fleet went from 19.1 million in 2009 to 20.8 million units in 2010. India's vehicle fleet increased to 210 million in March 2015. India has a fleet of 1.1 million natural gas vehicles as of December 2011 .

=== Australia ===
As of January 2011, the Australian motor vehicle fleet had 16.4 million registered vehicles, with an ownership rate of 730 motor vehicles per 1000 people, up from 696 vehicles per 1000 residents in 2006. The motor vehicle fleet grew by 14.5% since 2006, at an annual rate of 2.7% over these five years.

== Motorization rates by region and selected country ==
The following table compares vehicle ownership rates by region with those of the United States, the country with one of the highest motorization rates in the world, and how they have evolved from 1999 to 2016.

Comparison of motorization rates by region and selected country (1999 and 2016) (vehicles per 1,000 people)
Country or region	1999	2006	2016
Africa	20.9	25.2	38.9
Asia – Far East	39.1	49.7	105.6
Asia – Middle East	66.2	99.8	147.4
Brazil	107.5	129.0	209.3
Canada	560.0	599.6	686.3
Central and South America	133.6	102.4	174.7
China	10.2	26.6	141.2
Europe – Eastern Europe	370.0	254.4	362.1
Europe – Western Europe	528.8	593.7	606.0
India	8.3	11.6	36.3
Indonesia	13.7	31.7	87.2
Pacific	513.9	524.7	634.9
United States	790.1	840.7	831.9

== Production by country ==
In 2023, global motor vehicle production reached approximately 93.5 million units, according to data from the International Organization of Motor Vehicle Manufacturers (OICA). The following table shows the top 15 manufacturing countries for 2017 and their corresponding annual production between 2004 and 2017.

Annual motor vehicle production by country Top 15 countries 2017
World rank 2017	Country	2017	2016	2015	2014	2013	2012	2011	2010	2009	2008	2007	2006	2005	2004
1	China	29,015,434	28,118,794	24,503,326	23,722,890	22,116,825	19,271,808	18,418,876	18,264,761	13,790,994	9,299,180	8,882,456	7,188,708	5,717,619	5,234,496
2	United States	11,189,985	12,198,137	12,100,095	11,660,699	11,066,432	10,335,765	8,661,535	7,743,093	5,709,431	8,672,141	10,780,729	11,263,986	11,946,653	11,989,387
3	Japan	9,693,746	9,204,590	9,278,238	9,774,558	9,630,181	9,943,077	8,398,630	9,628,920	7,934,057	11,575,644	11,596,327	11,484,233	10,799,659	10,511,518
4	Germany	5,645,581	6,062,562	6,033,164	5,907,548	5,718,222	5,649,260	6,146,948	5,905,985	5,209,857	6,045,730	6,213,460	5,819,614	5,757,710	5,569,954
5	India	4,782,896	4,488,965	4,125,744	3,840,160	3,898,425	4,174,713	3,927,411	3,557,073	2,641,550	2,332,328	2,253,729	2,019,808	1,638,674	1,511,157
6	South Korea	4,114,913	4,228,509	4,555,957	4,524,932	4,521,429	4,561,766	4,657,094	4,271,741	3,512,926	3,826,682	4,086,308	3,840,102	3,699,350	3,469,464
7	Mexico	4,068,415	3,597,462	3,565,469	3,365,306	3,054,849	3,001,814	2,681,050	2,342,282	1,561,052	2,167,944	2,095,245	2,045,518	1,684,238	1,577,159
8	Spain	2,848,335	2,885,922	2,733,201	2,402,978	2,163,338	1,979,179	2,373,329	2,387,900	2,170,078	2,541,644	2,889,703	2,777,435	2,752,500	3,012,174
9	Brazil	2,699,672	2,156,356	2,429,463	3,146,118	3,712,380	3,402,508	3,407,861	3,381,728	3,182,923	3,215,976	2,977,150	2,611,034	2,530,840	2,317,227
10	France	2,227,000	2,082,000	1,970,000	1,817,000	1,740,000	1,967,765	2,242,928	2,229,421	2,047,693	2,568,978	3,015,854	3,169,219	3,549,008	3,665,990
11	Canada	2,199,789	2,370,271	2,283,474	2,393,890	2,379,834	2,463,364	2,135,121	2,068,189	1,490,482	2,082,241	2,578,790	2,572,292	2,687,892	2,711,536
12	Thailand	1,988,823	1,944,417	1,915,420	1,880,007	2,457,057	2,429,142	1,457,798	1,644,513	999,378	1,393,742	1,287,346	1,194,426	1,122,712	927,981
13	United Kingdom	1,749,385	1,816,622	1,682,156	1,598,879	1,597,872	1,576,945	1,463,999	1,393,463	1,090,139	1,649,515	1,750,253	1,648,388	1,803,109	1,856,539
14	Turkey	1,695,731	1,485,927	1,358,796	1,170,445	1,125,534	1,072,978	1,189,131	1,094,557	869,605	1,147,110	1,099,413	987,780	879,452	823,408
15	Russia	1,551,293	1,303,989	1,384,399	1,886,646	2,184,266	2,233,103	1,990,155	1,403,244	725,012	1,790,301	1,660,120	1,508,358	1,354,504	1,386,127
	World total	97,302,534	94,976,569	90,780,583	89,747,430	87,507,027	84,236,171	79,880,920	77,583,519	61,762,324	70,729,696	73,266,061	69,222,975	66,719,519	64,496,220

== See also ==
- Non-motorist
- Active mobility
- Effects of the car on societies
- Environmentally friendly vehicle
- History of the automobile
- List of countries by vehicles per capita
- List of countries by motor vehicle production
- List of countries by traffic-related death rate
- List of motor vehicle awards
- Motor vehicle emissions
- Peak car use
- Road traffic safety
- Sustainable transport
- Traffic congestion
