= Net energy gain =

Difference between energy expended and energy obtained from a source

Net Energy Gain (NEG) is a concept used in energy economics that refers to the difference between the energy expended to harvest an energy source and the amount of energy gained from that harvest. When the NEG of a resource is greater than zero, extraction yields excess energy. If the NEG is below zero, it requires more energy to extract the resource than can be extracted from it. The net energy gain, which can be expressed in joules, differs from the net financial gain that may result from the energy harvesting process, in that various sources of energy (e.g. natural gas, coal, etc.) may be priced differently for the same amount of energy.

== Calculating NEG ==
A net energy gain is achieved by expending less energy acquiring a source of energy than is contained in the source to be consumed. That is

$$NEG =  Energy_{\hbox{Consumable}} - Energy_{\hbox{Expended}}.$$

Factors to consider when calculating NEG is the type of energy, the way energy is used and acquired, and the methods used to store or transport the energy. It is also possible to overcomplicate the equation by an infinite number of externalities and inefficiencies that may be present during the energy harvesting process.

== Sources of energy ==
The definition of an energy source is not rigorous. Anything that can provide energy to anything else can qualify. Wood in a stove is full of potential thermal energy; in a car, mechanical energy is acquired from the combustion of gasoline, and the combustion of coal is converted from thermal to mechanical, and then to electrical energy. Examples of energy sources include:

- Fossil fuels
- Nuclear fuels (e.g., uranium and plutonium)
- Radiation from the sun
- Mechanical energy from wind, rivers, tides, etc.
- Bio-fuels derived from biomass, in turn having consumed soil nutrients during growth.
- Heat from within the earth (geothermal energy)

The term net energy gain can be used in slightly different ways:

=== Non-sustainables ===
The usual definition of net energy gain compares the energy required to extract energy (that is, to find it, remove it from the ground, refine it, and ship it to the energy user) with the amount of energy produced and transmitted to a user from some (typically underground) energy resource. To better understand this, assume an economy has a certain amount of finite oil reserves that are still underground, unextracted. To get to that energy, some of the extracted oil needs to be consumed in the extraction process to run the engines driving the pumps, therefore after extraction the net energy produced will be less than the amount of energy in the ground before extraction, because some had to be used up.

The extraction energy can be viewed in one of two ways: profitable extractable (NEG>0) or nonprofitable extractable (NEG<0). For instance, in the Athabasca Oil Sands, the highly diffuse nature of the tar sands and low price of crude oil rendered them uneconomical to mine until the late 1950s (NEG<0). Since then, the price of oil has risen and a new steam extraction technique has been developed, allowing the sands to become the largest oil provider in Alberta (NEG>0).

=== Sustainables ===
The situation is different with sustainable energy sources, such as hydroelectric, wind, solar, and geothermal energy sources, because there is no bulk reserve to account for (other than the Sun's lifetime), but the energy continuously trickles, so only the energy required for extraction is considered.

In all energy extraction cases, the life cycle of the energy-extraction device is crucial for the NEG-ratio. If an extraction device is defunct after 10 years, its NEG will be significantly lower than if it operates for 30 years. Therefore, the 'energy payback time (sometimes referred to as energy amortization) can be used instead, which is the time, usually given in years, a plant must operate until the running NEG becomes positive (i.e. until the amount of energy needed for the plant infrastructure has been harvested from the plant).

=== Biofuels ===
Net energy gain of biofuels has been a particular source of controversy for ethanol derived from corn (bioethanol). The actual net energy of biofuel production is highly dependent on both the bio source that is converted into energy, how it is grown and harvested (and in particular the use of petroleum-derived fertilizer), and how efficient the process of conversion to usable energy is. Details on this can be found in the Ethanol fuel energy balance article. Similar considerations also apply to biodiesel and other fuels.

== ISO 13602 ==
ISO 13602-1 provides methods to analyse, characterize and compare technical energy systems (TES) with all their inputs, outputs and risk factors. It contains rules and guidelines for the methodology for such analyses.

ISO 13602-1 describes a means of to establish relations between inputs and outputs (net energy) and thus to facilitate certification, marking, and labelling, comparable characterizations, coefficient of performance, energy resource planning, environmental impact assessments, meaningful energy statistics and forecasting of the direct natural energy resource or energyware inputs, technical energy system investments and the performed and expected future energy service outputs.

In ISO 13602-1:2002, renewable resource is defined as "natural resource for which the ratio of the creation of the natural resource to the output of that resource from nature to the technosphere is equal to or greater than one".

=== Examples ===
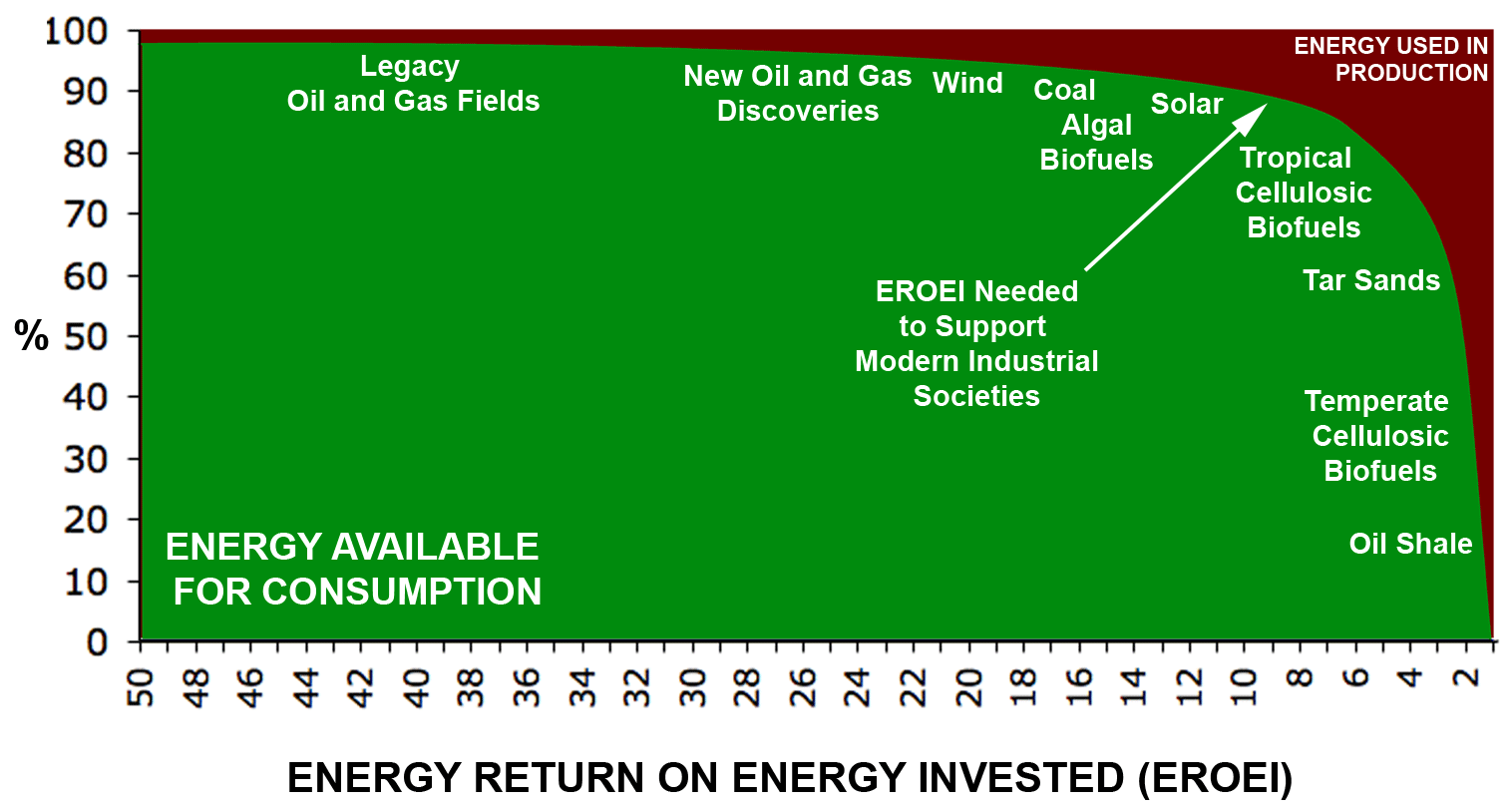
Net energy cliff with degrading EROI

During the 1920s, 50 barrels (7.9 m^{3}) of crude oil were extracted for every barrel of crude used in the extraction and refining process. Today only 5 barrels (0.79 m^{3}) are harvested for every barrel used. When the net energy gain of an energy source reaches zero, then the source is no longer contributing energy. However, energy used for extraction can be of a different source, such as renewables, so that the oil can be conserved for higher value uses.

== See also ==
- ISO 13600
- Energy economics
- Energy law
- Energy return on investment
- Energyware and energy carrier
- Solar cell#Declining costs and exponential capacity growth
- Energy cannibalism
