= Energy return on investment =

Ratio of usable energy from a resource

In energy economics and ecological energetics, energy return on investment (EROI), also sometimes called energy returned on energy invested (ERoEI), is the ratio of the amount of usable energy (the exergy) delivered from a particular energy resource to the amount of exergy used to obtain that energy resource.

Arithmetically, the EROI can be defined as:

$EROI = \frac{\hbox{Energy Delivered}}{\hbox{Energy Required to Deliver that Energy}}$.

When the EROI of a source of energy is less than or equal to one, that energy source becomes a net "energy sink" and can no longer be used as a source of energy. A related measure, called energy stored on energy invested (ESOEI), is used to analyse storage systems.

To be considered viable as a prominent fuel or energy source, a fuel or energy must have an EROI ratio of at least 3:1.

== History ==
The energy analysis field of study is credited with being popularised by Charles A. S. Hall, a systems ecology and biophysical economics professor at the State University of New York. Hall applied the biological methodology developed at an Ecosystems Marine Biological Laboratory, and then adapted that method to research human industrial civilisation. The concept would have its greatest exposure in 1984, with a paper by Hall that appeared on the cover of the journal Science.

== Application to various technologies ==
=== Photovoltaic ===
Global PV market by technology in 2013.
1. multi-Si (54.9%)
2. mono-Si (36.0%)
3. CdTe (5.10%)
4. a-Si (2.00%)
5. CIGS (2.00%)

Gauging the EROI of photovoltaic technologies proves to be difficult and is still the subject of numerous studies. This is mainly due to "energy invested" varying depending on technology, methodology, and system boundary assumptions, resulting in a range from a maximum of 2000 kWh/m^{2} of module area down to a minimum of 300 kWh/m^{2}, with a median value of 585 kWh/m^{2} according to a meta-study from 2013.

Regarding output, it depends on the local insolation, not just the system itself, so assumptions have to be made.

Some studies (see below) include in their analysis that photovoltaic cells produce electricity, while the invested energy may be lower grade primary energy.

A 2015 review in Renewable and Sustainable Energy Reviews assessed the energy payback time and EROI of a variety of PV module technologies. In this study, which uses an insolation of 1700 kWh/m^{2}/yr and a system lifetime of 30 years, mean harmonised EROIs between 8.7 and 34.2 were found. Mean harmonised energy payback time varied from 1.0 to 4.1 years. In 2021, the Fraunhofer Institute for Solar Energy Systems calculated an energy payback time of around 1 year for European PV installations (0.9 years for Catania in Southern Italy, 1.1 years for Brussels) with wafer-based silicon PERC cells.

=== Wind turbines ===
In the scientific literature EROIs wind turbines is around 16 unbuffered and 4 buffered. Data collected in 2018 found that the EROI of operational wind turbines averaged 19.8 with high variability depending on wind conditions and wind turbine size. EROIs tend to be higher for recent wind turbines compared to older technology wind turbines. Vestas reports an EROI of 31 for its V150 model wind turbine.

=== Hydropower plants ===
The EROI for hydropower plants averages about 110 when it is run for about 100 years.

=== Oil sands ===
Because much of the energy required for producing oil from oil sands (bitumen) comes from low value fractions separated out by the upgrading process, there are two ways to calculate EROI, the higher value given by considering only the external energy inputs and the lower by considering all energy inputs, including self generated. One study found that in 1970, oil sand net energy returns were about 1.0, but by 2010 had increased to about 5.23.

=== Conventional oil ===
Conventional sources of oil have a rather large variation depending on various geologic factors. The EROI for refined fuel from conventional oil sources varies from around 18 to 43.

=== Oil Shale ===
Due to the process heat input requirements for oil shale harvesting, the EROI is low. Typically, natural gas is used, either directly combusted for process heat or used to power an electricity-generating turbine, which then uses electrical heating elements to heat the underground layers of shale to produce oil from the kerogen. The resulting EROI is typically around 1.4–1.5. Economically, oil shale might be viable due to the effectively free natural gas on site used for heating the kerogen, but opponents have debated that the natural gas could be extracted directly and used for relatively inexpensive transportation fuel rather than heating shale for a lower EROI and higher carbon emissions.

=== Oil liquids ===
The weighted average standard EROI of all oil liquids (including coal-to-liquids, gas-to-liquids, biofuels, etc.) is expected to decrease from 44.4 in 1950 to 6.7 in 2050.

=== Natural gas ===
The standard EROI for natural gas is estimated to decrease from 141.5 in 1950 to an apparent plateau of 16.8 in 2050.

=== Nuclear plants ===
The EROI for nuclear plants ranges from 20 to 81.

== Non-manmade energy inputs ==
The natural or primary energy sources are not included in the calculation of energy invested, only the human-applied sources. For example, in the case of biofuels, the solar insolation driving photosynthesis is not included, and the energy used in the stellar synthesis of fissile elements is not included for nuclear fission. The energy returned includes only human usable energy and not wastes such as waste heat.

Nevertheless, heat of any form can be counted where it is actually used for heating. However, the use of waste heat in district heating and water desalination in cogeneration plants is rare, and in practice it is often excluded in EROI analysis of energy sources.

== Competing methodology ==
In a 2010 paper by Murphy and Hall, a proposed extended ["Ext"] boundary protocol, for all future research on EROI, was detailed, to produce what they consider to be a more realistic assessment and to generate greater consistency in comparisons than what Hall and others view as the "weak points" in competing methodology. In more recent years, however, a source of continued controversy is the creation of a different methodology endorsed by certain members of the IEA which for example most notably in the case of photovoltaic solar panels, controversially generates more favorable values.

In the case of photovoltaic solar panels, the IEA method tends to focus on the energy used in the factory process alone. In 2016, Hall observed that much of the published work in this field is produced by advocates or persons with a connection to business interests among the competing technologies, and that government agencies had not yet provided adequate funding for rigorous analysis by more neutral observers.

== Relationship to net energy gain ==
EROI and Net energy (gain) measure the same quality of an energy source or sink in numerically different ways. Net energy describes the amounts, while EROI measures the ratio or efficiency of the process. They are related simply by

$$\hbox{GrossEnergyYield}  \div \hbox{EnergyExpended}  =  EROI$$

or

$$(\hbox{NetEnergy} \div \hbox{EnergyExpended} ) + 1 =  EROI$$

For example, given a process with an EROI of 5, expending 1 unit of energy yields a net energy gain of 4 units. The break-even point happens with an EROI of 1 or a net energy gain of 0. The time to reach this break-even point is called energy payback period (EPP) or energy payback time (EPBT).

== Economic influence ==
Although many qualities of an energy source matter (for example, oil is energy-dense and transportable, while wind is variable), when the EROI of the main sources of energy for an economy fall, that energy becomes more difficult to obtain and its relative price may increase.

With regard to fossil fuels, when oil was originally discovered, it took on average one barrel of oil to find, extract, and process about 100 barrels of oil. The ratio, for discovery of fossil fuels in the United States, has declined steadily over the last century from about 1000:1 in 1919 to only 5:1 in the 2010s.

Since the invention of agriculture, humans have increasingly used exogenous sources of energy to multiply human muscle power. Some historians have attributed this largely to more easily exploited (i.e. higher EROI) energy sources, which is related to the concept of energy slaves. Thomas Homer-Dixon argues that a falling EROI in the Later Roman Empire was one of the reasons for the collapse of the Western Empire in the fifth century CE. In "The Upside of Down", he suggests that EROI analysis provides a basis for the analysis of the rise and fall of civilisations. Looking at the maximum extent of the Roman Empire, (60 million) and its technological base, the agrarian base of Rome was about 1:12 per hectare for wheat and 1:27 for alfalfa (giving a 1:2.7 production for oxen). One can then use this to calculate the population of the Roman Empire required at its height, based on about 2,500–3,000 calories per day per person. It comes out roughly equal to the area of food production at its height. But ecological damage (deforestation, soil fertility loss, particularly in southern Spain, southern Italy, Sicily and especially north Africa) saw a collapse in the system beginning in the 2nd century, as EROI began to fall. It bottomed in 1084 when Rome's population, which had peaked under Trajan at 1.5 million, was only 15,000.

Evidence also fits the cycle of Mayan and Cambodian collapse too. Joseph Tainter suggests that diminishing returns of the EROI is a chief cause of the collapse of complex societies, which has been suggested as caused by peak wood in early societies. Falling EROI due to depletion of high-quality fossil fuel resources also poses a difficult challenge for industrial economies, and could potentially lead to declining economic output and challenge the concept (which is very recent when considered from a historical perspective) of perpetual economic growth.

Newer research (2024) found that if EROIs are measured at the stage of useful energy rather than final energy, EROI of fossil fuels are lower than electricity producing renewable energies, even if intermittency is accounted for.

== Criticism of EROI ==
Measuring energy output is a solved problem; measuring the input remains highly debated.

EROI is calculated by dividing the energy output by the energy input. Measuring total energy output is often easy, especially in the case of an electrical output, where some appropriate electricity meter can be used. However, researchers disagree on how to determine energy input accurately and therefore arrive at different numbers for the same source of energy.

How deep should the probing in the supply chain of the tools being used to generate energy go? For example, if steel is being used to drill for oil or construct a nuclear power plant, should the energy input of the steel be taken into account? Should the energy input into building the factory being used to construct the steel be taken into account and amortised? Should the energy input of the roads which are used to ferry the goods be taken into account? What about the energy used to cook the steelworkers' breakfasts? These are complex questions evading simple answers. A full accounting would require considerations of opportunity costs and comparing total energy expenditures in the presence and absence of this economic activity.

However, when comparing two energy sources, a standard practice for the supply chain energy input can be adopted. For example, consider the steel, but don't consider the energy invested in factories deeper than the first level in the supply chain. It is in part for these fully encompassed systems reasons, that in the conclusions of Murphy and Hall's paper in 2010, an EROI of 5 by their extended methodology is considered necessary to reach the minimum threshold of sustainability, while a value of 12–13 by Hall's methodology is considered the minimum value necessary for technological progress and a society supporting high art.

Richards and Watt propose an Energy Yield Ratio for photovoltaic systems as an alternative to EROI (which they refer to as Energy Return Factor). The difference is that it uses the design lifetime of the system, which is known in advance, rather than the actual lifetime. This also means that it can be adapted to multi-component systems where the components have different lifetimes.

Another issue with EROI that many studies attempt to tackle is that the energy returned can be in different forms, and these forms can have different utility. For example, electricity can be converted more efficiently than thermal energy into motion, due to electricity's lower entropy. In addition, the form of energy of the input can be completely different from the output. For example, energy in the form of coal could be used in the production of ethanol. This might have an EROI of less than one, but could still be desirable due to the benefits of liquid fuels (assuming the latter are not used in the processes of extraction and transformation).

== Additional EROI calculations ==
There are three prominent expanded EROI calculations: point of use, extended, and societal. Point of Use EROI expands the calculation to include the cost of refining and transporting the fuel during the refining process. Since this expands the bounds of the calculation to include more production processes, EROI will decrease. Extended EROI provides point of use expansions, as well as the cost of creating the infrastructure needed for transportation of the energy or fuel once refined. Societal EROI is the sum of all the EROIs of all the fuels used in a society or nation. A societal EROI has never been calculated, and researchers believe it may currently be impossible to know all variables necessary to complete the calculation, but attempted estimates have been made for some nations. Calculations are done by summing all of the EROIs for domestically produced and imported fuels and comparing the result to the Human Development Index (HDI), a tool often used to understand well-being in a society. According to this calculation, the amount of energy a society has available to it increases the quality of life for the people living in that country, and countries with less energy available also have a harder time satisfying citizens' basic needs. This is to say that societal EROI and overall quality of life are very closely linked.

== EROI and payback periods of some types of power plants ==
The following table is a compilation of sources of energy, taken from a review paper published in 2022.

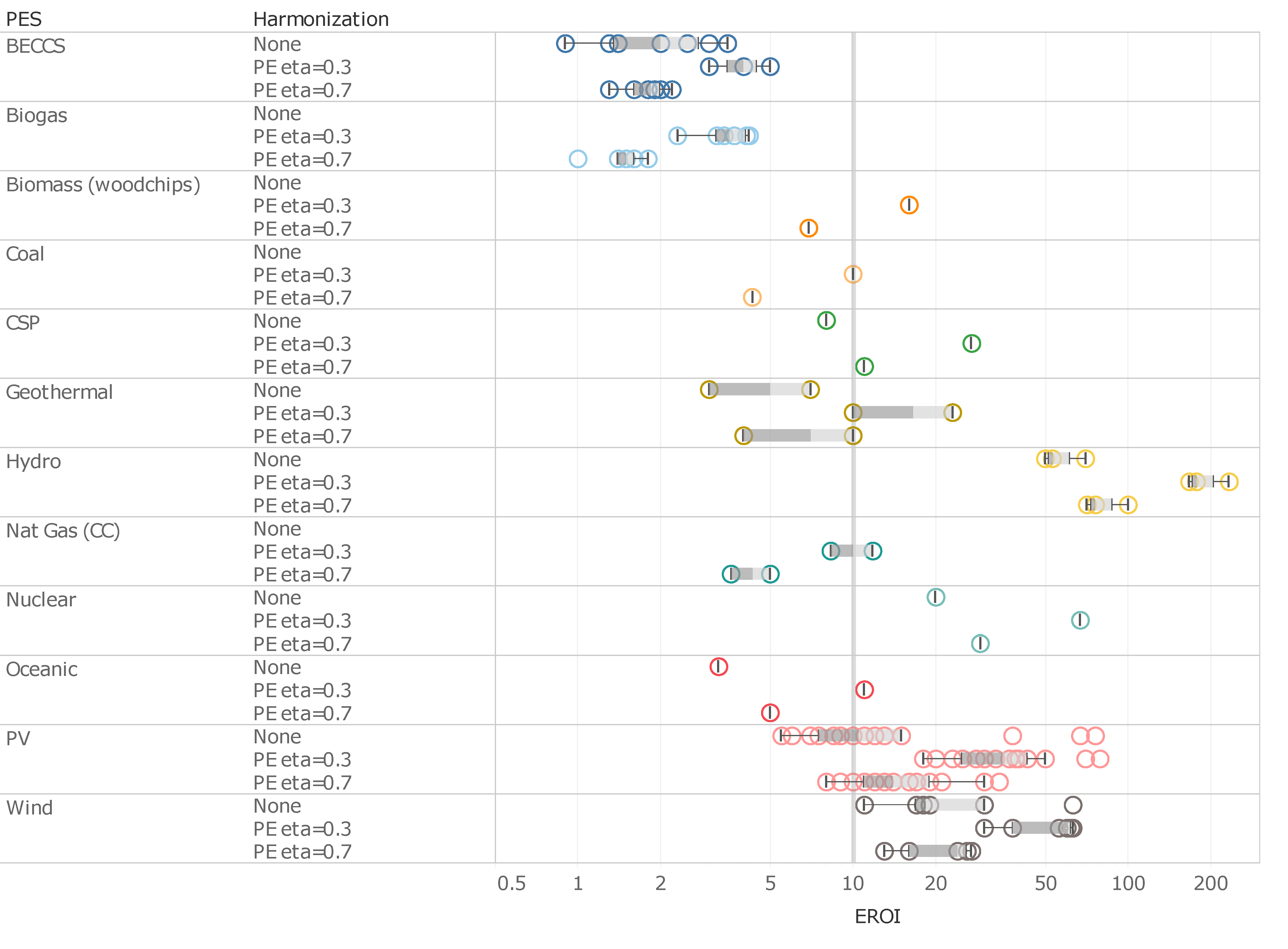
EROI values in power generation

== ESOEI ==
ESOEI (or ESOI_{e}) is used when EROI is below 1. "ESOI_{e} is the ratio of electrical energy stored over the lifetime of a storage device to the amount of embodied electrical energy required to build the device."

| Storage Technology | ESOEI |
|---|---|
| Lead–acid battery | 5 |
| Zinc–bromide battery | 9 |
| Vanadium redox battery | 10 |
| NaS battery | 20 |
| Lithium-ion battery | 32 |
| Pumped hydroelectric storage | 704 |
| Compressed-air energy storage | 792 |

One of the notable outcomes of the Stanford University team's assessment on ESOI was that if pumped storage was not available, the combination of wind energy and the commonly suggested pairing with battery technology, as it presently exists, would not be sufficiently worth the investment, suggesting instead curtailment.

== EROI under rapid growth ==
A related recent concern is energy cannibalism, where energy technologies can have a limited growth rate if climate neutrality is demanded. Many energy technologies are capable of replacing significant volumes of fossil fuels and concomitant greenhouse gas emissions. Unfortunately, neither the enormous scale of the current fossil fuel energy system nor the necessary growth rate of these technologies is well understood within the limits imposed by the net energy produced for a growing industry. This technical limitation is known as energy cannibalism and refers to an effect where rapid growth of an entire energy-producing or energy efficiency industry creates a need for energy that uses (or cannibalises) the energy of existing power plants or production plants.

The solar breeder overcomes some of these problems. A solar breeder is a photovoltaic panel manufacturing plant which can be made energy-independent by using energy derived from its own roof using its own panels. Such a plant becomes not only energy self-sufficient but a major supplier of new energy, hence the name solar breeder. Research on the concept was conducted by Centre for Photovoltaic Engineering, University of New South Wales, Australia. The reported investigation establishes certain mathematical relationships for the solar breeder which indicate that a vast amount of net energy is available from such a plant for the indefinite future. The solar module processing plant at Frederick, Maryland was originally planned as such a solar breeder. In 2009 the Sahara Solar Breeder Project was proposed by the Science Council of Japan as a cooperation between Japan and Algeria with the highly ambitious goal of creating hundreds of GW of capacity within 30 years.

== See also ==
- Cost of electricity by source – levelised cost of energy
- Embodied energy
- Emergy
- Energy balance
- Energy cannibalism
- Exergy – useful energy
- Jevons paradox – 1880s observation of the efficiency effect multiplier
- Khazzoom–Brookes postulate – 1980s updating of Jevons paradox
- Net energy gain
- Social metabolism
- Thermoeconomics
