= Energy cannibalism =

Energy cannibalism refers to an effect where rapid growth of a specific energy producing industry creates a need for energy that uses (or cannibalizes) the energy of existing power plants. Thus during rapid growth the industry as a whole produces no new energy because it is used to fuel the embodied energy of future power plants.

== Theoretical underpinnings ==
In order for an “emission free” power plant to have a net negative impact on the greenhouse gas emissions of the energy supply it must produce enough emission-less electricity to offset both greenhouse gas emissions that it is directly responsible for (e.g. from concrete used to construct a nuclear power plant) and to offset the greenhouse gas emissions from electricity generated for its construction (e.g. if coal is used to generate electricity while constructing a nuclear power plant). This can become challenging during rapid growth of the “emission free” technology because it may require the construction of additional power plants of the older technology simply to power the construction of the new “emission free” technology.

== Derivation ==
First, all the individual power plants of a specific type can be viewed as a single aggregate plant or ensemble and can be observed for its ability to mitigate emissions as it grows. This ability is first dependent on the energy payback time of the plant. Aggregate plants with a total installed capacity of $C_T$ (in GW) produces:

| $E_T = t \cdot C_T = t \cdot \sum_{n=1}^N C_n$ | 1 |

of electricity, where $t$ (in hours per year) is the fraction of time the plant is running at full capacity, $C_n$ is the capacity of individual power plants and $N$ is the total number of plants. If we assume that the energy industry grows at a rate, $r$, (in units of 1/year, e.g. 10% growth = 0.1/year) it will produce additional capacity at a rate (in GW/year) of

| $r \cdot C_T$. | 2 |

After one year, the electricity produced would be

| $r \cdot C_T \cdot 8760\,h$. | 3 |

The time that the individual power plant takes to pay for itself in terms of energy it needs over its life cycle, or the energy payback time, is given by the principal energy invested (over the entire life cycle), $E_P$, divided by energy produced (or fossil fuel energy saved) per year, $E_{ann}$. Thus if the energy payback time of a plant type is $E_P/E_{ann}$, (in years,) the energy investment rate needed for the sustained growth of the entire power plant ensemble is given by the cannibalistic energy, $E_{Can}$:

| $E_{Can} = \frac{E_P}{E_{ann}} \cdot r \cdot C_T \cdot t$ | 4 |

The power plant ensemble will not produce any net energy if the cannibalistic energy is equivalent to the total energy produced. So by setting equation (1) equal to (4) the following results:

| $\frac{E_P}{E_{ann}} \cdot r \cdot C_T \cdot t = C_T \cdot t$ | 5 |

and by doing some simple algebra it simplifies to:

| $\frac{E_P}{E_{ann}} = \frac{1}{r}$ | 6 |

So if one over the growth rate is equal to the energy payback time, the aggregate type of energy plant produces no net energy until growth slows down.

== Greenhouse gas emissions ==
This analysis was for energy but the same analysis is true for greenhouse gas emissions. The principle greenhouse gas emissions emitted in order to provide for the power plant divided by the emissions offset every year must be equal to one over the growth rate of type of power to break even.

== Example ==
For example, if the energy payback is 5 years and the capacity growth is 20%, no net energy is produced and no greenhouse gas emissions are offset if the only power input to the growth is fossil during the growth period.

== Applications to the nuclear industry ==
In the article “Thermodynamic Limitations to Nuclear Energy Deployment as a Greenhouse Gas Mitigation Technology” the necessary growth rate, r, of the nuclear power industry was calculated to be 10.5%. This growth rate is very similar to the 10% limit due to energy payback example for the nuclear power industry in the United States calculated in the same article from a life cycle analysis for energy.

These results indicate that any energy policies with the intention of driving down greenhouse gas emissions with deployment of additional nuclear reactors will not be effective unless the nuclear energy industry in the U.S. improves its efficiency.

Some of the energy input into nuclear power plants occurs as production of concrete, which consumes little electricity from power plants.

== Applications to other industries ==
As with nuclear power plants, hydroelectric dams are built with large amounts of concrete, which equate to considerable CO_{2} emissions, but little power usage. The long lifespan of hydroplants then contribute to a positive power ratio for a longer time than most other power plants.

For the environmental impact of solar power, the energy payback time of a power generating system is the time required to generate as much energy as was consumed during production of the system. In 2000 the energy payback time of PV systems was estimated as 8 to 11 years and in 2006 this was estimated to be 1.5 to 3.5 years for crystalline silicon PV systems and 1-1.5 years for thin film technologies (S. Europe). Similarly, the energy return on investment (EROI) is to be considered.

For wind power, energy payback is around one year.
