= Energy balance =

Energy balance may refer to:

- Earth's energy balance, the relationship between incoming solar radiation, outgoing radiation of all types, and global temperature change.
- Energy accounting, a system used within industry, where measuring and analyzing the energy consumption of different activities is done to improve energy efficiency
- Energy balance (biology), a measurement of the biological homeostasis of energy in living systems
- Energy balance (energy economics), verification and analysis of emergence, transformation and use of energy sources within an economic zone
- Energy economics, where the energy balance of a country is an aggregate presentation of all human activities related to energy, except for natural and biological processes
- Energy Economics (journal), a scientific journal published by Elsevier under its "North Holland" imprint
- Energy returned on energy invested (EROEI), ratio of the amount of usable energy acquired from a particular energy resource to the amount of energy expended to obtain that energy resource
- First law of thermodynamics, according to which energy cannot be created or destroyed, only modified in form
- Groundwater energy balance, comparing a groundwater body in terms of incoming hydraulic energy associated with groundwater inflow and outflow

== See also ==
- Balance energy, a close‑to‑real time ancillary service to balance power flows and managed by the incumbent transmission system operator or similar entity
