= Dry milling and fractionation of grain =

Food processing and manufacturing

Dry milling of grain is mainly utilized to manufacture feedstock into consumer and industrial based products. This process is widely associated with the development of new bio-based associated by-products. The milling process separates the grain into four distinct physical components: the germ, flour, fine grits, and coarse grits. The separated materials are then reduced into food products utilized for human and animal consumption.

It is estimated that 165 million bushels of maize are dry-milled per year. Currently, dry milling is mainly focused on corn-based products for human and animal consumption, or utilized during fuel ethanol production. The main objective of the dry-milling process is to separate the endosperm, which is mainly composed of starch, from the germ and pericarp fibers as much as possible.

== Features ==
The dry milling process includes a number of unique features:

- Physical separation (size/density) based on mass
- No use of chemicals
- Maximizing surface area of solids for processing
- Resource pulping
- Minimal water use, if any (short tempering)
  Note: Water is not used as a separation agent
- Low capital cost
- Lower separation compared to wet milling
- Lower concentration of starch, protein, fiber, and oil relative to wet milling

The most utilized grinding mills include pin, hammer, and disk mills, but many machines are utilized for more specific processes. To maintain a high starch extraction, the grains will go through a degermination process. This process removes the germ and fiber (pericarp) first, and the endosperm is recovered in several sizes: grits, cones, meal, and flow. The gluten protein matrix is not separated from the starch.

== Yields ==
The table below is a compilation of particle size and yield of milled maize products.

Product	Particle size range (mm)	Yield (% by weight)
Flaking grits	5.8-3.4	12
Coarse grits	2.0-1.4	15
Medium grits	1.4-1.0	23
Fine grits	1.0-0.65	23
Coarse meal	0.65-0.3	10
Fine meal	0.3-0.17	10
Flour	<0.17	5

== Uses ==
Currently, products of dry milled corn products are used mostly in animal food, brewing and breakfast cereals industries.

Grits/Cones

- Breakfast cereals
- Snack foods
- Pet foods
- Corn bread
- Breads

Flour

- Baby foods
- Baking mixes
- Batters
- Desserts
- Frozen foods
- Meat extenders
- Thickening agents

Germ

- Grain based oil
- Vitamin carriers
- Mayonnaise
- Potato chips
- Soups
- Sauces
- Livestock feed

During alcohol production, the main advantage of dry milling is the flexibility in type and quality of grain which can be utilized as substrates for the fermentation process. Dry milling can be utilized for a number of different grains with little to no alteration to machine operation characteristics.

== Laws of grinding ==
Currently, there are three main empirical models which are used to calculate the grinding work required relative to grain size and quantity. The Kick model may be utilized for grains with diameters greater than 50 mm; the Bond model for grain diameter between 0.05 mm – 50 mm; the Von Rittinger model for grain less than 0.05 mm. The calculations are shown here:

Kick Model

$W_k = c_k(\ln d_A - \ln d_E)$

Bond Model

$W_B = c_b \left ( \frac{1}{\sqrt{d_E}} - \frac{1}{\sqrt{d_A}} \right )$

Von Rittinger Model

$W_R = c_R \left ( \frac {1}{d_E} - \frac{1}{d_A} \right )$

In all three models:

W is the work in kj/kg;
c is the grinding coefficient
d_{A} is the grain size of the source grain;
d_{E} is the size of the ground material.

While Bond's coefficient may be viewed in various literature, the calculation for Kick's and Von Rittinger's coefficients may be viewed below:

$c_k = 1.151 \frac{c_B}{\sqrt{d_{BU}}}$

$c_R = 0.5 \frac{c_B}{\sqrt{d_{BL}}}$

where d_{BU} = 50mm and d_{BL} = 0.05mm.

To analyze the grinding results the dispositions of the source and ground material must be computed. To quantify this characteristic the grinding degree is calculated, which is a ratio of sizes relative to the grain disposition. The grinding degree relative to grain size d80 is shown:

$Z_d = \frac{d_{80,1}}{d_{80,2}}$

where the d_{80} value signifies 80% mass is of size smaller than the grain.

== Types of dry grinders ==
There are three methods used for corn dry-milling:

- Alkaline-cooked process
- Stone-ground (non-degerming process)
- Tempering degerming process

Tempering degerming is the most common process used for grain dry-milling in the industry.

== Process overview ==
Corn dry milling consists of several steps. The following paragraphs describe all the steps of dry milling as well as the equipment used during these steps in detail.

=== Tempering ===
A chamber is used at this section in order to mix the corn and water and let them temper for 10 to 30 minutes. For more efficient separation, differential moisture content between germ and endosperm is desired. Tempering of kernel leads to moisture uptake. Because of the differential swelling of germ and endosperm, the germ becomes more flexible and resilient during tempering while there is no movement of material out of kernel.

=== Degermination ===
The objective of degermination in corn dry milling is to break down kernel to pericarp, endosperm and germ. Beall operation is used for fulfilling this goal which separates the kernels received from tempering section into tails and throughs. Beall degerminator is known for its high yield of flaking grits; however, other manufactures have lower power requirement. Pilot plant Beall has an inner cone rotating at 800 rpm. One of the advantages of Beall degermination is weight adjustment at tailgate for increment the residence time by holding back the material.

=== Aspiration ===
Aspiration is a unit operation used for separating the pericarp from the mixture of endosperm and germ, using terminal velocity which is affected by particle size, shape and density.

=== Gravity separation ===
Gravity separation is a method used for separating the components of a mixture with different specific weight. Gravity separation in dry milling is utilized in order to separate endosperm from germ.

=== Roller milling and sifting ===
Roller mills use cylindrical rollers for grinding different materials, especially grains, which can even be an appropriate substitution for hammer mill and ball mills. Sifting is used in order to adjust the distribution of endosperm particle

=== Oil recovery ===
There are two methods for oil recovery used in industry: 1) Corn expelling which is not commercially used in the US for corn germ oil recovery due to its low oil yield and presence of residuals oil in solid products; however, it is simple and cheap. 2) Extraction which is mostly used because of its high oil yield and lower residual oil although it is expensive and has explosion and safety risks.
