= Sahara Solar Breeder Project =

Joint effort between Japanese and Algerian universities

The Sahara Solar Breeder Project is a joint Japanese–Algerian universities plan to use the abundant solar energy and sand in the Sahara desert to build silicon manufacturing plants, and solar power plants, in a way that their products are used in a "breeding" manner to build more and more such plants. The project's declared goal is to provide 50% of the world’s electricity by 2050, using superconductors to deliver the power to distant locations.

The project was first proposed by Hideomi Koinuma from the Science Council of Japan, at the 2009 G8+5 Academies' Meeting in Rome.

== See also ==
- Renewable energy in Algeria
