= Flexible-fuel vehicles in the United States =

The fleet of flexible-fuel vehicles in the United States is the second largest in the world after Brazil, and there were more than 21 million 85 flex-fuel vehicles registered in the country by the end of 2017. Despite the growing fleet of E85 flex-fuel vehicles, actual use of ethanol fuel is limited due to the lack of E85 refueling infrastructure and also because many North American flex-fuel car owners were not aware they owned an E85 flex-fuel vehicle. Flex-fuel vehicles are common in the Midwest, where corn is a major crop and is the primary feedstock for ethanol fuel production. Also the U.S. government has been using flex-fuel vehicles for many years.

U.S. flex-fuel vehicles are optimized to run on a maximum blend of 15% gasoline with 85% anhydrous ethanol (called E85 fuel). This limit in the ethanol content is set to reduce ethanol emissions at low temperatures and to avoid cold starting problems during cold weather, at temperatures lower than 11 °C (52 °F). The alcohol content is reduced during the winter in regions where temperatures fall below 0 °C (32 °F) to a winter blend of E70.

== History ==
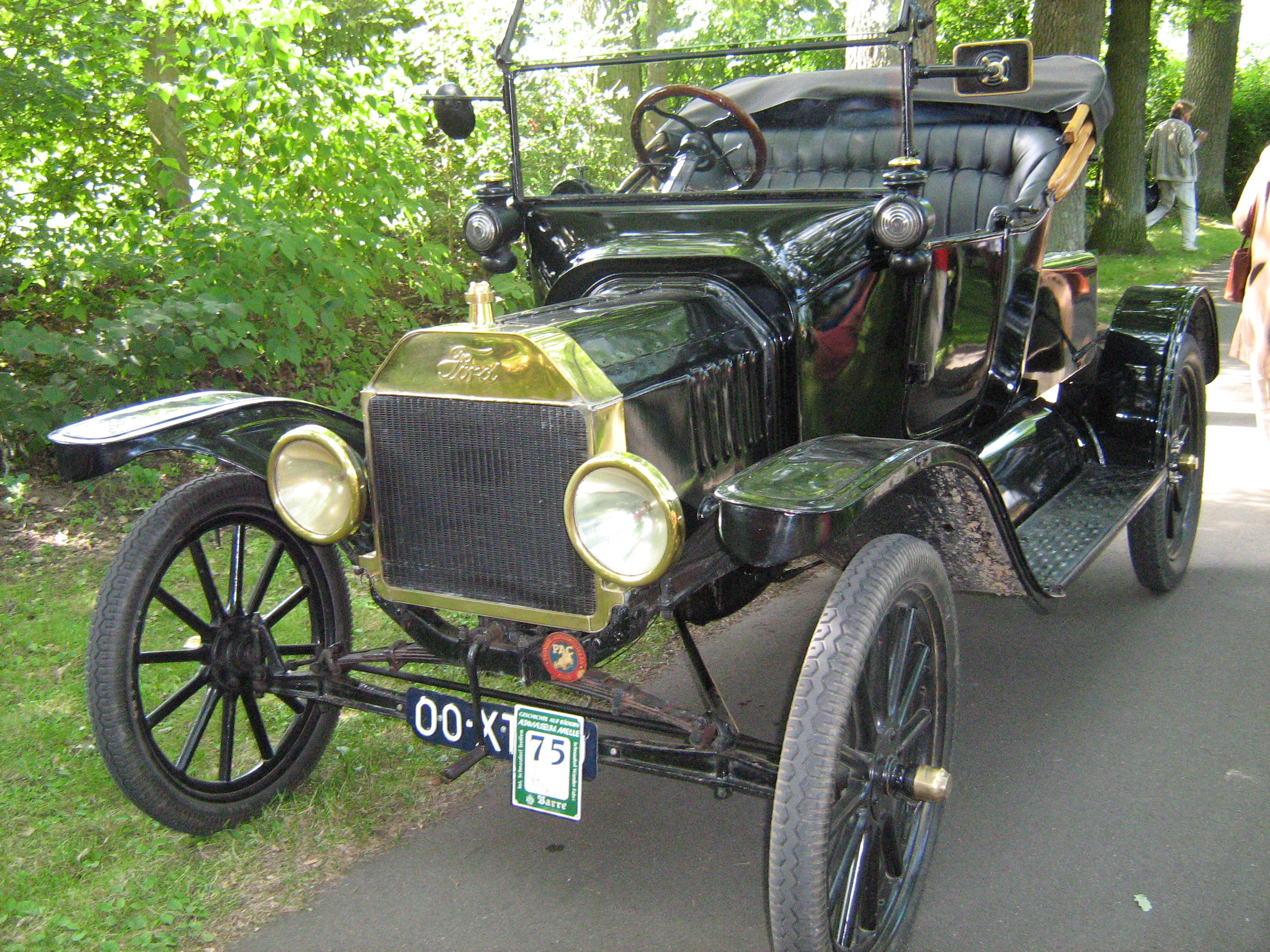
The Ford Model T was the first commercial flex-fuel vehicle. The engine was capable of running on gasoline or ethanol, or a mix of both.

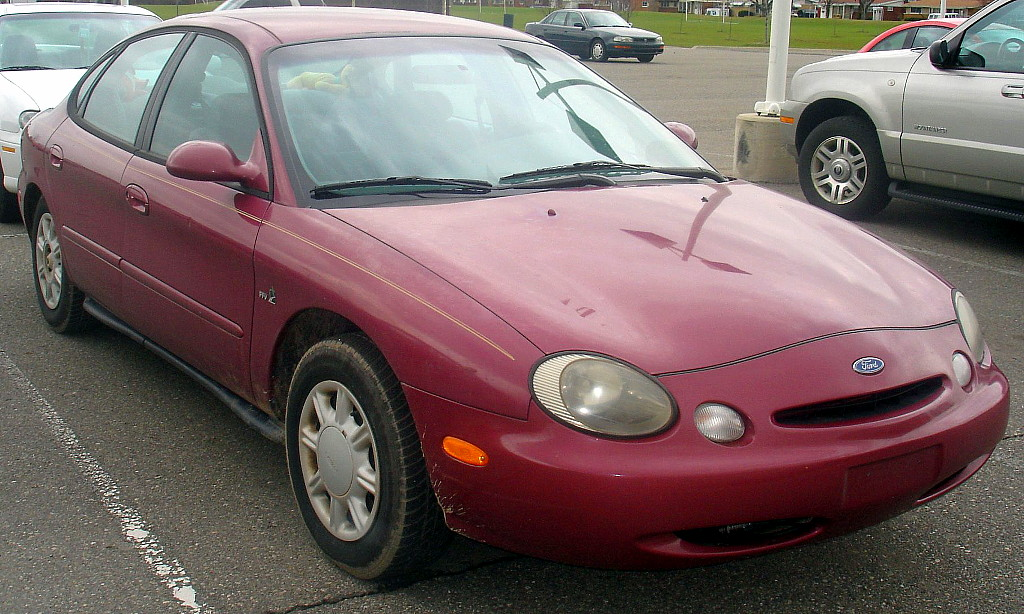
The 1996 Ford Taurus was the first flexible-fuel vehicle produced with versions capable of running with either ethanol (E85) or methanol (M85) blended with gasoline.

The first commercial flexible fuel vehicle was the Ford Model T, produced from 1908 through 1927. It was fitted with a carburetor with adjustable jetting, allowing use of gasoline or ethanol, or a combination of both. Other car manufactures also provided engines for ethanol fuel use. Ethanol was disadvantaged by frequent accusations that ethanol producers collaborated with bootleggers during Prohibition. Oil dominance as a motor fuel was questioned in the U.S. only after the 1973 oil crisis, which resulted in gasoline shortages and awareness on the dangers of oil dependence. This crisis opened a new opportunity for ethanol, methanol and other alternative fuels.

As a response to the shock caused by the first oil crisis, the U.S. government provided the initial support to develop alternative fuels, and some time later, also as a goal to improve air quality. Liquid fuels were preferred over gaseous fuels not only because they have a better volumetric energy density but also because they were the most compatible fuels with existing distribution systems and engines, thus avoiding a big departure from the existing technologies and taking advantage of the vehicle and the refueling infrastructure. California led the search of sustainable alternatives with interest focused in methanol. Ford Motor Company and other automakers responded to California's request for vehicles that run on methanol. In 1981, Ford delivered 40 dedicated methanol fuel (M100) Escorts to Los Angeles County, but only four refueling stations were installed. The biggest challenge in the development of alcohol vehicle technology was getting all of the fuel system materials compatible with the higher chemical reactivity of the fuel. Methanol was even more of a challenge than ethanol but much of the early experience gained with neat ethanol vehicle production in Brazil was transferable to methanol. The success of this small experimental fleet of M100s led California to request more of these vehicles, mainly for government fleets. In 1983, Ford built 582 M100 vehicles; 501 went to California, and the remaining to New Zealand, Sweden, Norway, United Kingdom, and Canada.

As an answer to the lack of refueling infrastructure, Ford began development of a flexible-fuel vehicle in 1982, and between 1985 and 1992, 705 experimental FFVs were built and delivered to California and Canada, including the 1.6L Ford Escort, the 3.0L Taurus, and the 5.0L LTD Crown Victoria. These vehicles could operate on either gasoline or methanol with only one fuel system. Legislation was passed to encourage the US auto industry to begin production, which started in 1993 for the M85 FFVs at Ford. In 1996, a new FFV Ford Taurus was developed, with models fully capable of running on either methanol or ethanol blended with gasoline. This ethanol version of the Taurus became the first commercial production of an E85 FFV. The momentum of the FFV production programs at the American car companies continued, although by the end of the 1990s, the emphasis shifted to the FFV E85 version, as it is today. Ethanol was preferred over methanol because there is a large support from the farming community, and thanks to the government's incentive programs and corn-based ethanol subsidies. Support for ethanol also comes from the fact that it is a biomass fuel, which addresses climate change concerns and greenhouse gas emissions, though nowadays these benefits are questioned and depend on the feedstock used for ethanol production and their indirect land use change impacts.

== Technology and production ==
E85 FFVs Manufactured and in Use in the United States 1998-2018
Year	Light-Duty E85 FFVs sold/leased	Light-Duty E85 FFVs net annual increase*	Total fleet E85 FFVs in use
1998	216,165	144,000	144,000
1999	426,724	306,149	450,148
2000	600,832	456,947	907,096
2001	581,774	466,203	1,373,299
2002	834,976	700,719	2,074,018
2003	859,261	750,437	2,824,455
2004	674,678	609,437	3,433,892
2005	735,693	683,217	4,117,109
2006	1,011,399	960,287	5,077,396
2007	1,115,069	1,076,902	6,154,298
2008	1,175,345	1,149,389	7,303,687
2009	805,777	n.a.	
2010	1,484,945	n.a.	
2011	2,116,273	n.a.	
2012	2,466,966	n.a.	
2013	2,665,470	n.a.	
2014	2,433,113	n.a.	
2015	1,881,500	n.a.	
2016	1,272,091	n.a.	
2017	1,150,097	n.a.	
2018	813,774	n.a.	
Total	21,790,445	n.a.	
Note: * Net increase is new FFVs manufactured discounted by the survival rate (less attrition). Source: National Renewable Energy Laboratory

As of 2017, there were more than 21 million E85 flex-fuel vehicles in the United States, up from about 11 million flex-fuel cars and light trucks in operation as of early 2013. The number of flex-fuel vehicles on U.S roads increased from 1.4 million in 2001, to 4.1 million in 2005, and rose to 7.3 million in 2008.

E85 flex-fuel vehicles are becoming increasingly common in the Midwest, where corn is a major crop and is the primary feedstock for ethanol fuel production. Also the US government has been using flex-fuel vehicles for many years. Since 2008 almost any type of automobile and light duty vehicles is available in the market with the flex-fuel option, including sedans, vans, SUVs and pick-up trucks. For the 2011 model year there are about 70 vehicles E85 capable.

The E85 blend is used in gasoline engines modified to accept such higher concentrations of ethanol, and the fuel injection is regulated through a dedicated sensor, which automatically detects the amount of ethanol in the fuel, allowing to adjust both fuel injection and spark timing accordingly to the actual blend available in the vehicle's tank.

The American E85 flex fuel vehicle was developed to run on any mixture of unleaded gasoline and ethanol, anywhere from 0% to 85% ethanol by volume. Both fuels are mixed in the same tank, and E85 is sold already blended. In order to reduce ethanol evaporative emissions and to avoid problems starting the engine during cold weather, the maximum blend of ethanol was set to 85%. There is also a seasonal reduction of the ethanol content to E70 (called winter E85 blend) in very cold regions, where temperatures fall below 0 °C (32 °F) during the winter. In Wyoming for example, E70 is sold as E85 from October to May.

=== Fuel economy ===
Because ethanol contains close to 34% less energy per unit volume than gasoline, E85 FFVs have a lower mileage per gallon than gasoline. However, this lower energy content does not translate directly into a 34% reduction in miles per U.S. gallon, because there are many other variables that affect the performance of a particular fuel in a particular engine, though for E85 the effect becomes significant. E85 will produce lower mileage than gasoline, and actual performance may vary depending on the vehicle. Based on EPA EPA-rated mileage for all 2006 E85 models, the average fuel economy for E85 vehicles was 25.56% lower than unleaded gasoline. When making price comparisons it has to be considered that E85 has octane rating of about 104 and could be used as a substitute for premium gasoline.

Regional retail E85 prices vary widely across the US, with more favorable prices in the Midwest region, where most corn is grown and ethanol produced. As of early November 2010, the US average spread between the price of E85 and gasoline was 13.4%, while in Indiana was 10.1%, in Minnesota 20.3%, 18.3% in Wisconsin, just 2% in Maryland, 16.3% in California, and 7% in Utah. Depending on the vehicle capabilities, the break even price of E85 has to be between 25 and 30% lower than gasoline. (See price comparisons for most states at e85prices.com)

For the 2011 model year many of the models available are trucks and sport-utility vehicles that get less than 20 mpg_{‑US} (12 L/100 km; 24 mpg_{‑imp}) when filled with gasoline. The following table compares fuel economy, carbon footprint, and petroleum consumption for several popular gasoline-powered vehicles and their flex-fuel versions:

Economic and environmental performance comparison among U.S. gasoline-powered automobiles and light duty vehicles and their flex-fuel versions
Vehicle	Type of vehicle	Year model	EPA City mileage (mpg)	EPA Highway mileage (mpg)	Annual fuel cost ^{(1)} ^{(2)} (USD)	Carbon footprint (Ton/yr of CO_{2}) ^{(3)}	Annual Petroleum Use (barrel)
Chevrolet Impala; Automatic 4-spd, 6 cyl, 3.9L	Gasoline	2011	17	27	$2,013	8.9	16.3
Chevrolet Impala; Automatic 4-spd, 6 cyl, 3.9L	E85 FFV	2011	13	20	$2,421	7.1	5.3
Ford Fusion; AWD Automatic (S6), 6 cyl, 3.0L	Gasoline	2011	18	26	$2,115	9.3	17.1
Ford Fusion; AWD Automatic (S6), 6 cyl, 3.0L	E85 FFV	2011	13	19	$2,421	7.1	5.3
Ford Escape; 4WD Automatic 6-spd, 6 cyl, 3.0L	Gasoline	2011	18	23	$2,115	9.3	17.1
Ford Escape; 4WD Automatic 6-spd, 6 cyl, 3.0L	E85 FFV	2011	13	17	$2,592	7.6	5.7
Cadillac Escalade (SUV); AWD Automatic 6-spd, 8 cyl, 6.2L	Gasoline	2011	13	18	$2,821	12.4	22.8
Cadillac Escalade (SUV); AWD Automatic 6-spd, 8 cyl, 6.2L	E85 FFV	2011	10	14	$3,024	8.8	6.7
Dodge Ram 1500 Pickup; 4WD Automatic 5-spd, 8 cyl, 4.7L	Gasoline	2011	13	18	$2,821	12.4	22.8
Dodge Ram 1500 Pickup; 4WD Automatic 5-spd, 8 cyl, 4.7L	E85 FFV	2011	9	12	$3,630	10.6	8.0
Notes: (1) Estimates assumes 45% highway driving, 55% city driving, and 15,000 annual miles. (2) Average U.S. prices: $2.82/gallon for gasoline, and $2.42/gallon for E85 fuel. E85 prices vary widely by region. As of early November 2010 the minimum price was $2.02/gallon in Illinois and the maximum price was $2.99/gallon in New York. (3) Direct carbon footprint only and does not account for any potential indirect land use change impacts of biofuels.

=== Pollution ===
The demand for ethanol fuel produced from field corn in the United States was stimulated by the discovery in the late 90s that methyl tertiary butyl ether (MTBE), an oxygenate additive in gasoline, was contaminating groundwater. Due to the risks of widespread and costly litigation, and because MTBE use in gasoline was banned in almost 20 states by 2006, the substitution of MTBE opened a new market for ethanol fuel. This shift also contributed to a sharp increase in the production and sale of E85 flex vehicles since 2002. Ethanol also replaces toxic, air-polluting substances such as benzene, toluene, and xylene. Numerous states require certain ethanol blends to reduce air pollution. Ethanol produces about 34% less air pollution than gasoline on average.

As of 2016, ethanol blends in the U.S. reduce emissions of carbon dioxide by about 40 million tons per year. During its entire life cycle, "from field to wheel," ethanol reduces emissions by about 34 percent. Second-generation cellulosic ethanol is even more efficient. A plant built by DuPont in Iowa achieves emission reductions of 90%.

== Barriers to adoption ==
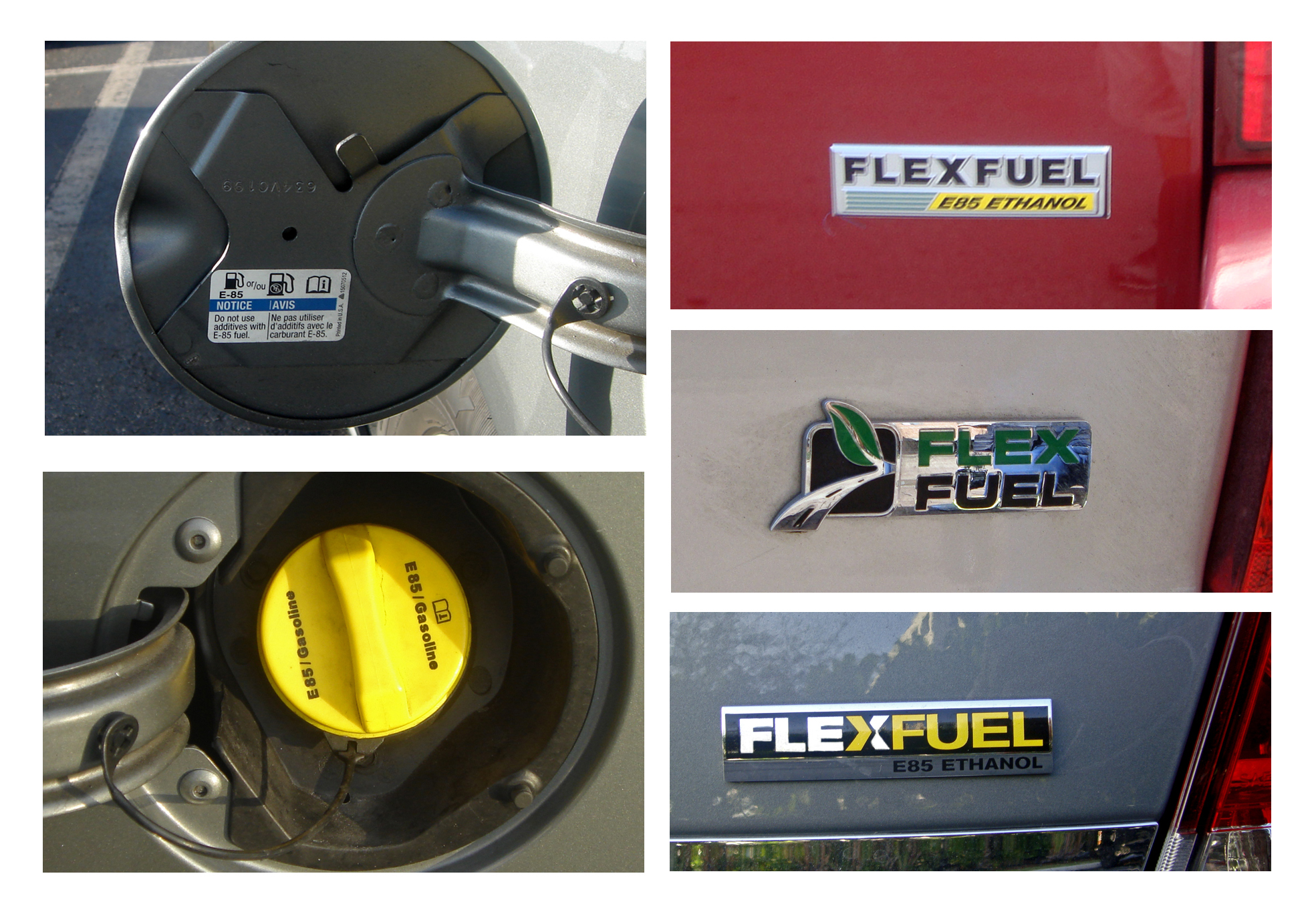
Typical labeling used in the US to identify E85 vehicles. Top left: a small sticker in the back of the fuel filler door. Bottom left: the bright yellow gas cap used in newer models. E85 Flexfuel badging used in newer models from Chrysler (top right), Ford (middle right) and GM (bottom right).

A 2005 survey found that 68% of American flex-fuel car owners were not aware they owned an E85 flex. This is due to the fact that the exterior of flex and non-flex vehicles look exactly the same; there is no sale price difference between them; the lack of consumer's awareness about E85s; and also the initial decision of American automakers of not putting any kind of exterior labeling, so buyers can be aware they are getting an E85 vehicle. In contrast, all Brazilian automakers clearly mark FFVs with badging or a high quality sticker in the exterior body, with a logo with some variant of the word Flex. Since 2006 many new FFV models in the US feature a bright yellow gas cap to remind drivers of the E85 capabilities. GM is also using badging with the text "Flexfuel/E85 Ethanol" to clearly mark the car as an E85 FFV, and Ford early flex-fuel models had a small decal reading "FFV" and the "leaf and road" logo, and later introduced badging keeping the "leaf and road" logo but changed the text to "Flex Fuel".

As of 2017, there were more than 21 million E85 flex-fuel vehicles in the United States, however, according to the U.S. Department of Energy, only 862,837 flex-fuel fleet-operated vehicles were regularly fueled with E85 in 2011 in 2011. The Energy Policy Act of 2005, signed into law by President Bush on 8 August 2005, in its Section 701 requires the federal government's fleet of vehicles capable of operating on alternative fuels to be operated on these fuels exclusively, unless a waiver is granted if the alternative fuel is not reasonably available; or if the cost of the fuel required is unreasonably more expensive compared to gasoline. By 2008 the Federal vehicle fleet consisted of 594,900 vehicles, of which 128,491 run on E85, representing the majority of the alternative fuel vehicles in the Federal fleet that year. According to the Government Accountability Office, in 2010 Federal employees received waivers to use gasoline in 55 percent of fleet flex-fuel vehicles because E85 was not available.

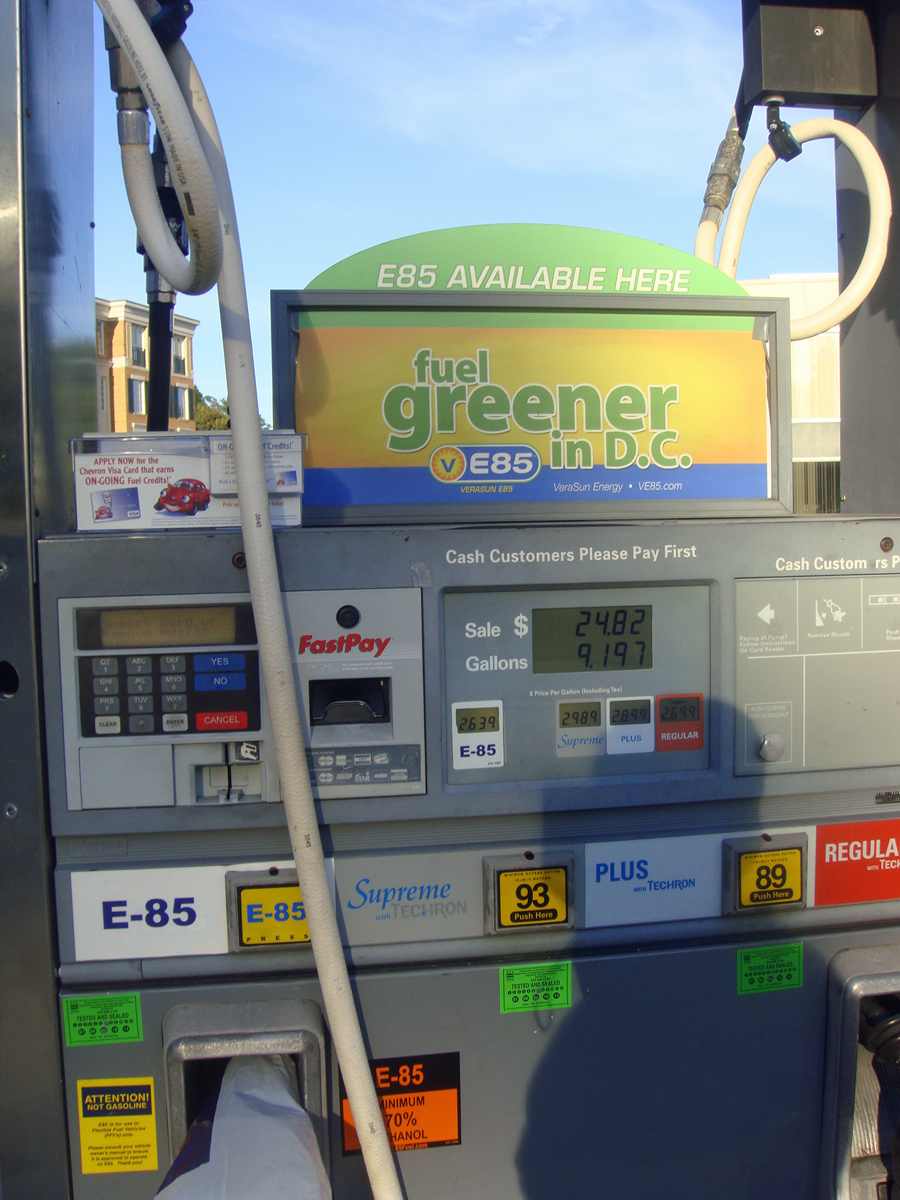
E85 fuel sold at a regular gasoline station.

Some critics have argued that American automakers have been producing E85 flex models motivated by a loophole in the Corporate Average Fuel Economy (CAFE) requirements, that allows for a fuel economy credit for every flex-fuel vehicle sold, whether or not in practice these vehicles are fueled with E85. This loophole might allow the car industry to meet the CAFE targets in fuel economy just by spending between US$100 to US$200 that it cost to turn a conventional vehicle into a flex-fuel, without investing in new technology to improve fuel economy, and saving them the potential fines for not achieving that standard in a given model year. In an example presented by the National Highway Traffic Safety Administration (NHTSA), the agency responsible for establishing the CAFE standards, the special treatment provided for alternative fuel vehicles, "turns a dual fuel vehicle that averages 25 mpg on gasoline or diesel... to attain the 40 mpg value for CAFE purposes." The current CAFE standards are 27.5 mpg for automobiles and 22.2 mpg for light-duty trucks."

In late 2007, CAFE standards received their first overhaul in more than 30 years through the Energy Independence and Security Act of 2007 (EISA), and were set to rise to 35 mpg by the year 2020. However, in May 2009 the Obama Administration announced a new harmonized national policy that will require an average fuel economy standard of 35.5 mpg in 2016. The flex-fuel CAFE credits are scheduled to end in 2016, but because the 2007 EISA made CAFE credits exchangeable between different classes of automobiles and tradable between companies, and also carmakers are allowed to carry over credits for up to five years, the flex-fuel credits accumulated up to 2016 can be carried over and traded until 2020. The CAFE standards proposed in 2011 for the period 2017-2025 will allow flexible-fuel vehicles to receive extra credit but only when the carmakers present data proving how much E85 such vehicles have actually consumed.

A major restriction hampering sales of E85 flex vehicles or fuelling with E85, is the limited infrastructure available to sell E85 to the public, as by 2014 only 2 percent of motor fuel stations offered E85, up from about 1 percent in 2011. As of November 2015, there were only 3,218 gasoline fueling stations selling E85 to the public in the entire U.S., while about 156,000 retail motor fuel outlets do not offer the E85 blend. The number of E85 grew from 1,229 in 2007 to 2,442 in 2011, but only increased by 7% from 2011 to 2013, when the total reached 2,625. There is a great concentration of E85 stations in the Corn Belt states, and as of November 2015, the leading state is Minnesota with 274 stations, followed by Michigan with 231, Illinois with 225, Iowa with 204, Indiana with 188, Texas with 181, Wisconsin with 152, and Ohio with 126. Only eight states do not have E85 available to the public, Alaska, Delaware, Hawaii, Montana, Maine, New Hampshire, Rhode Island, and Vermont. The main constraint for a more rapid expansion of E85 availability is that it requires dedicated storage tanks at filling stations, at an estimated cost of US$60,000 for each dedicated ethanol tank.

== Latest developments ==
Several members of the United States Congress have called for mandatory production of flexible fuel vehicles. Also the E85 and Biodiesel Access Act proposed to modify current IRS limits on the tax credit which today only allows for the amount a dual fuel dispenser exceeds the cost of a conventional dispenser. The E85 and Biodiesel Access Act would increase the credit from 30 percent of the cost of clean fueling property to 50 percent and increase the maximum credit to $100,000. This law would also extend the existing credit which is scheduled to expire at the end of 2009.

In 2008 Chrysler, General Motors, and Ford pledged to manufacture 50 percent of their entire vehicle line as flexible fuel in model year 2012, if enough fueling infrastructure develops. In early 2010 GM reaffirmed its commitment to biofuels and its determination to deliver more than half of its 2012 production in the U.S. market as E85 flex-fuel capable vehicles. GM will begin introducing E-85-capable direct-injected and turbocharged powertrains, and urged the deployment of more E85 stations, as "ninety percent of registered flex-fuel vehicles don't have an E85 station in their ZIP code, and nearly 50%, don't have E85 in their county."

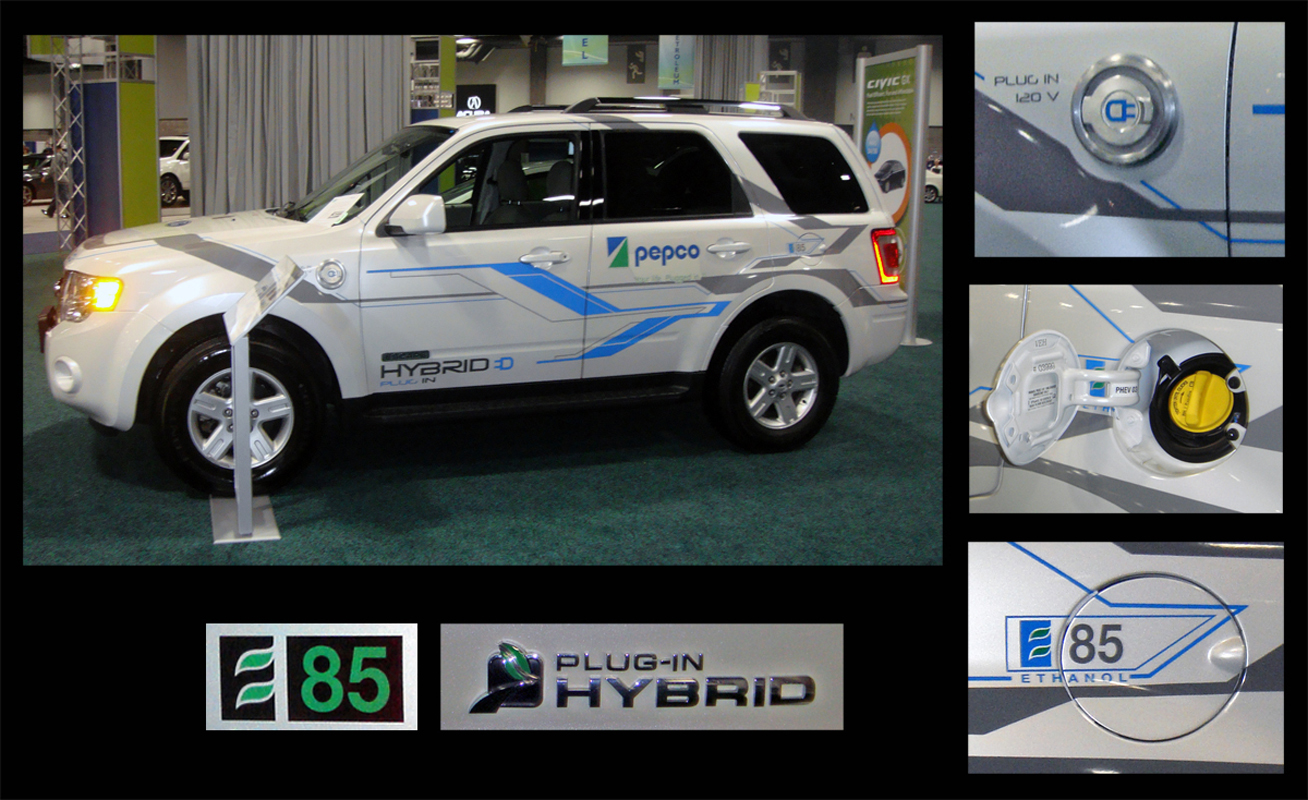
Demonstration Ford Escape E85 flex-fuel plug-in hybrid.

In 2008 Ford delivered the first flex-fuel plug-in hybrid as part of a demonstration project, a Ford EscapePlug-in Hybrid capable of running on E85 or gasoline. General Motors announced that the new plug-in hybrid electric vehicle Chevrolet Volt, launched in the United States market in December 2010, would be flex-fuel-capable in 2013. The Volt propulsion architecture allows to adapt the propulsion to other world markets such as Brazil's E100 or to Europes commonly use clean diesel.

In May 2009, President Barack Obama signed a Presidential Directive with the aim to advance biofuels research and improve their commercialization. The Directive established a Biofuels Interagency Working Group composed of three agencies, the Department of Agriculture, the Environmental Protection Agency, and the Department of Energy. This group will develop a plan to increase flexible fuel vehicle use and assist in retail marketing efforts. Also they will coordinate infrastructure policies impacting the supply, secure transport, and distribution of biofuels in order to increase the number of fueling stations throughout the country.

The Obama Administration set the goal of installing 10,000 blender pumps nationwide until 2015. Blender or flexible fuel pumps simultaneously dispense E85 and other lower blends such as E50, E30 and E20 that can be used by E85 flex-fuel vehicles. In April 2011 the US Department of Agriculture (USDA) issue a rule to include flexible fuel pumps in the Rural Energy for America Program (REAP). This rule will provide financial assistance, via grants and guaranteed loans, to fuel station owners to install E85 and blender pumps.

In May 2011 the Open Fuel Standard Act (OFS) was introduced to Congress with bipartisan support. The bill requires that 50 percent of automobiles made in 2014, 80 percent in 2016, and 95 percent in 2017, would be manufactured and warranted to operate on non-petroleum-based fuels, which includes existing technologies such as flex-fuel, natural gas, hydrogen, biodiesel, plug-in electric and fuel cell. Considering the rapid adoption experience with flexible-fuel vehicles in Brazil and the fact that by 2010 the cost of making vehicles flex-fuel capable is approximately $100 per car, the bill's primarily objective was to promote a massive adoption of flex-fuel vehicles capable of running on ethanol or methanol."

As of December 2014, almost half of new vehicles produced by Chrysler, Ford, and General Motors are flex-fuel, meaning roughly one-quarter of all new vehicles sold by 2015 are capable of using up to E85. However, obstacles to widespread use of E85 fuel remain. A 2014 analysis by the Renewable Fuels Association (RFA) found that oil companies prevent or discourage affiliated retailers from selling E85 through rigid franchise and branding agreements, restrictive supply contracts, and other tactics. The report showed independent retailers are five times more likely to offer E85 than retailers carrying an oil company brand.

== List of currently produced flexible-fuel vehicles ==
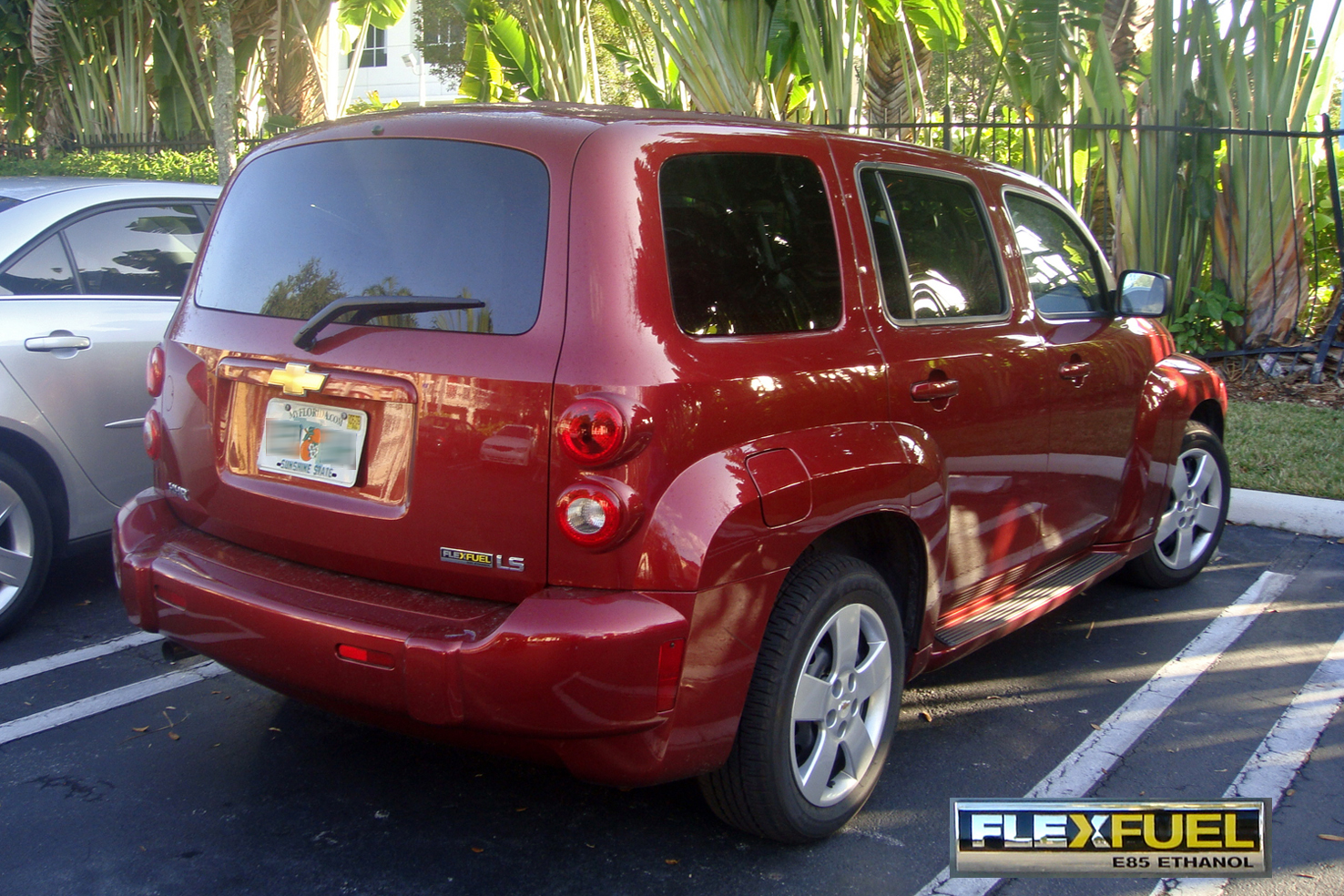
E85 FlexFuel Chevrolet HHR LS.

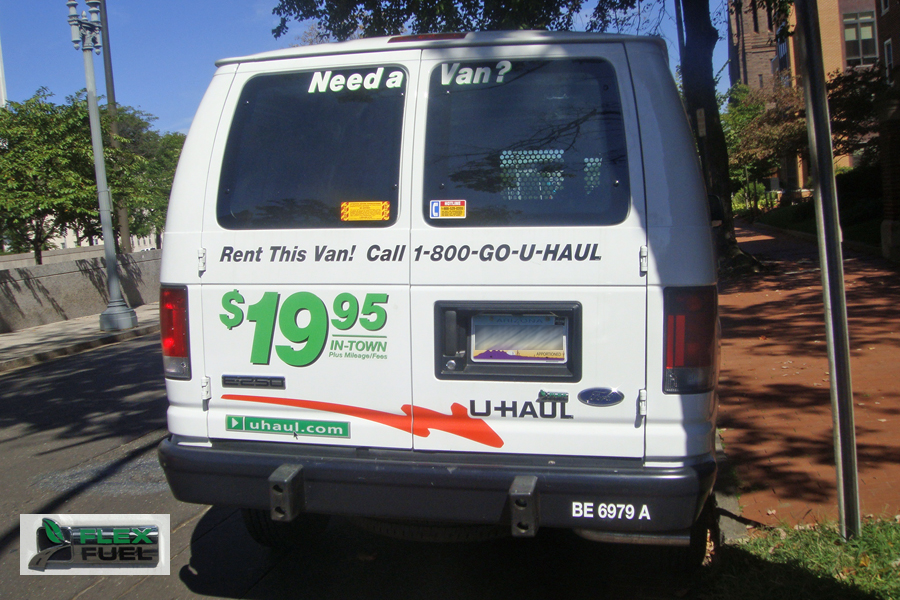
E85 Flexfuel Ford E-250.

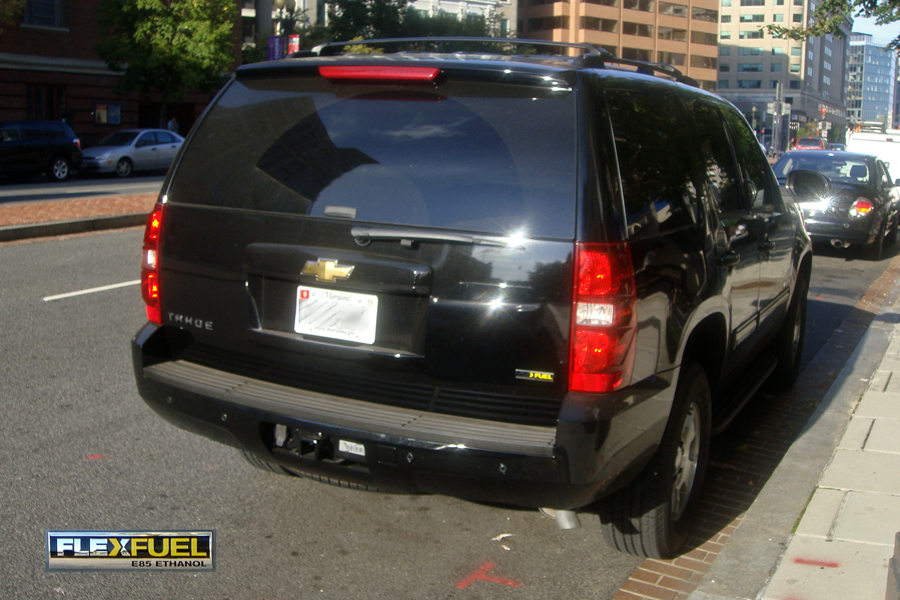
E85 FlexFuel Chevrolet Tahoe.

- Audi

Model	Engine	Model Years
A4	2.0L	2013-2016
A5	2.0L	2013-2017
allroad	2.0L	2013-2016
Q5	2.0L	2013-2017

- Bentley

Model	Engine	Model Years
Continental Flying Spur	6.0L	2011-2013
Continental GT & Convertible	6.0L	2012-2015
Flying Spur	6.0L	2014-2015

- Chrysler

Model	Engine	Model Years
200	2.4L	2015-2017
200, Avenger	3.6L	2011-2014
Avenger	2.7L	2008-2014
300, Charger	3.6L	2011-2019
Aspen	4.7L	2007-2009
Sebring sedan and convertible	2.7L	2003-2010
Town and Country, Grand Caravan	3.6L	2011-2019
Town and Country, Grand Caravan	3.3L	2008-2010
Town and Country, Voyager, Caravan/Grand Caravan	3.3L	1998-2003
Charger	3.6L	2011-2018
Challenger	3.6L	2011, 2023
Dakota	4.7L	2008-2011
Dart	2.0L	2013-2016
Durango	3.6L	2011-2013
Durango	4.7L	2006-2010
Journey	3.6L	2011-2019
Ram 1500	3.6L	2013-2018
Ram 1500	4.7L	2004-2013
Stratus sedan	2.7L	2003-2006
Cherokee	2.4L	2015-2018
Commander	4.7L	2007-2009
Grand Cherokee	3.6L	2011-2015
Grand Cherokee	4.7L	2007-2009
Renegade (BU) FWD	2.4L	2015-2018

- Ford

Model	Engine	Model Years
Crown Victoria	4.6L	2006-2011
E-Series Van	4.6L	2009-2014
E-Series Van	5.4L	2009-2014
Escape, Mariner	3.0L	2010-2012
Escape	2.5L	2017-2019
Expedition, Navigator	5.4L	2009-2014
Explorer	3.5L non-turbo	2013-2024
Explorer, Mountaineer	4.0L	2002-2005
Explorer Sport Trac	4.0L	2004-2005
F-150	3.5L non-turbo	2015-2023
F-150	3.7L	2011-2014
F-150	5.0L	2011-2023
F-150	5.4L	2006-2010
Focus	2.0L non-turbo	2012-2017
Fusion, Milan	3.0L	2010-2012
Ranger	3.0L	1998-2003
Super Duty	6.2L	2011-
Taurus	3.5L non-turbo	2013-2019
Taurus	3.0L OHV	1996-2006
Transit	3.7L	2015-2019
Transit	3.5L	2020-2022
Transit Connect	2.0L	2016-2022
Town Car	4.6L	2006-2011
Grand Marquis	4.6L	2007-2011
Sable	3.0L OHV	2002-2004
Lincoln Navigator	5.4L	2009-2014

- General Motors

Model	Engine	Model Years
LaCrosse	3.6L	2012-2016
Lucerne	3.9L	2009-2011
Regal	2.0L turbocharged (not GS)	2011-2013
Regal	2.4L w/o eAssist	2012-2013
Terraza	3.9L	2007
Verano	2.4L	2012-2013
ATS	3.6L	2013
Escalade	6.2L	2009-2014
SRX	3.6L	2012-2013
Avalanche	4.8L	2010
Avalanche	6.2L	2009-2010
Avalanche	5.3L	2003-2013
Captiva Sport	2.4L	2013-2015
Equinox, Terrain	2.4L	2012-2017
Equinox, Terrain	3.0L	2011-2012
Express, Savana	4.8L	2010-2013
Express, Savana	6.0L	2007-2015
Express, Savana	5.3L	2007-2014
HHR	2.2L	2009-2011
HHR	2.4L	2009-2011
Impala	3.6L	2012-2020
Impala	3.9L	2008-2011
Impala	3.5L	2006-2011
Malibu	2.4L (fleet only)	2010-2012
Monte Carlo	3.9L	2006-2007
S-10, Sonoma, Isuzu Hombre	2.2L	2000-2002
Silverado, Sierra	4.3L	2014-2018
Silverado, Sierra	4.8L	2010-2013
Silverado, Sierra	5.3L	2003-
Silverado, Sierra	6.2L	2009-2013
Suburban, Yukon XL	5.3L	2002-2020
Tahoe, Yukon	6.2L	2009-2014
Tahoe, Yukon	5.3L	2002-2020
Trailblazer, Encore GX	1.2L	2025-
Trax, Envista	1.2L	2025-
Uplander, Montana, Terraza, Relay	3.9L	2007-2008
Van	5.3L	2007-2009
Hummer H2	6.2L	2009
9-5	2.0 turbocharged	2011

- Jaguar Land Rover

Model	Engine	Model Years
XF	3.0L	2014
XF	5.0L	2013-2015
XJ	3.0L	2014-2015
XJ	5.0L	2013-2015
Range Rover	3.0L	2014
Range Rover	5.0L	2014-2015
Range Rover Sport	3.0L	2014
Range Rover Sport	5.0L	2014-2015

- Mazda

Model	Engine	Model Years
Tribute	3.0L	2009-2011
B-Series	3.0L	1999-2003

- Mercedes-Benz

Model	Engine	Model Years
C-Class W203	2.5L	2007
C-Class W203	2.6L	2005
C-Class W203	3.2L	2003-2005
C-Class W204	3.5L	2012-2014
C-Class W204	3.0L	2008-2012
E-Class W212	3.5L	2012-2016
CLA250 4MATIC	2.0L	2015-2019
GLA250 4MATIC	2.0L	2015-2019
GLA350 4MATIC	3.5L	2016-2018
ML-Class W166	3.5L	2012-2015

Mitsubishi

Model	Engine	Model Years
Raider	4.7L	2008-2009

- Nissan

Model	Engine	Model Years
Armada	5.6L	2007-2015
Titan	5.6L	2005-2015
Frontier	4.0L	2017-2019

- Toyota

Model	Engine	Model Years
Sequoia	5.7L	2009-2018
Tundra	5.7L	2009-2019

Volkswagen

Model	Engine	Model Years
Routan	3.6L	2011-2013

== See also ==
- Alternative fuel vehicle
- Butanol fuel
- Ethanol fuel in the United States
- Flexible-fuel vehicles in Brazil
- Green vehicle
- Hybrid electric vehicles in the United States
- List of flexible-fuel vehicles by car manufacturer
- Plug-in electric vehicles in the United States
