= History of ethanol fuel in Brazil =

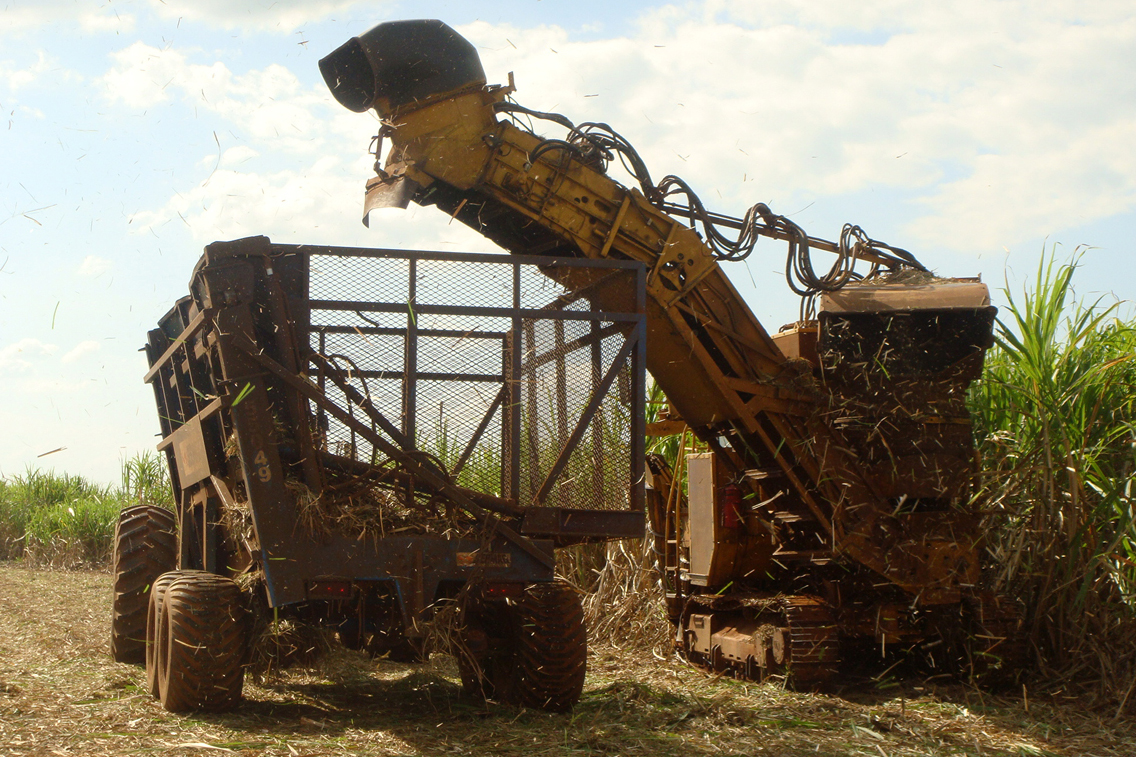
Mechanized harvesting of sugarcane (Saccharum officinarum), Piracicaba, São Paulo.

The history of ethanol fuel in Brazil dates from the 1970s and relates to Brazil's sugarcane-based ethanol fuel program, which allowed the country to become the world's second largest producer of ethanol, and the world's largest exporter. Several important political and technological developments led Brazil to become the world leader in the sustainable use of bioethanol, and a policy model for other developing countries in the tropical zone of Latin America, the Caribbean, and Africa. Government policies and technological advances also allowed the country to achieve a landmark in ethanol consumption, when ethanol retail sales surpassed 50% market share of the gasoline-powered vehicle fleet in early 2008. This level of ethanol fuel consumption had only been reached in Brazil once before, at the peak of the Pró-Álcool Program near the end of the 1980s.

== Early experiences ==
Historical evolution of ethanol blends used in Brazil (1976–2015)
Year	Ethanol blend	Year	Ethanol blend	Year	Ethanol blend
1931	E5	1989	E18-22-13	2004	E20
1976	E11	1992	E13	2005	E22
1977	E10	1993–98	E22	2006	E20
1978	E18-20-23	1999	E24	2007	E23-25
1981	E20-12-20	2000	E20	2008	E25
1982	E15	2001	E22	2009	E25
1984–86	E20	2002	E24-25	2010	E20-25
1987–88	E22	2003	E20-25	2011	E18-E25
				2015	E27
Source: J.A. Puerto Rica (2007), Table 3.8, pp. 81–82; Note: The 2010 reduction from E25 to E20 was temporary and took place between February and April. The minimum blend floor was reduced to E18 in April 2011.

Sugarcane has been cultivated in Brazil since 1532. Introduced in Pernambuco that year, sugar was one of the first commodities exported to Europe by the Portuguese settlers. Ethyl alcohol or ethanol is obtained as a by-product of sugar mills producing sugar, and can be processed to produce alcoholic beverages, ethanol fuel or alcohol for industrial or antiseptic uses. The first use of sugarcane ethanol as fuel in Brazil dates back to the late twenties and early thirties of the 20th century, with the introduction of the automobile in the country. After World War I some experimenting took place in Brazil's Northeast Region, and as early as 1919, the Governor of Pernambuco mandated all official vehicles to run on ethanol. The first ethanol fuel production plant went on line in 1927, the Usina Serra Grande Alagoas (USGA), located in the Northeastern state of Alagoas, producing fuel with 75% ethanol and 25% ethyl ether. As other plants began producing ethanol fuel, two years later there were 500 cars running on this fuel in the country's Northeast Region.

A decree was issued on February 20, 1931, mandating the blend of 5% hydrated ethanol to all imports of gasoline by volume. The number of distilleries producing ethanol fuel went from 1 in 1933 to 54 by 1945. Fuel-grade ethanol production increased from 100,000 liters in 1933 to 51.5 million liters in 1937, representing 7% of the country's fuel consumption. Production peaked to 77 million liters during World War II, representing 9.4% of all ethanol production in the country. Due to German submarine attacks threatening oil supplies, the mandatory blend was as high as 50 percent in 1943. After the end of the war cheap oil caused gasoline to prevail, and ethanol blends were only used sporadically, mostly to take advantage of sugar surpluses, until the 1970s, when the first oil crisis resulted in gasoline shortages and awareness on the dangers of oil dependence.

== The Pro-Alcohol era ==
Ethanol-only and Flexible-fuel light vehicles manufactured in Brazil from 1979 to 2011 (Selected years)
Year	Neat Ethanol (E100) vehicles Produced	E20/E100 Flexible fuel vehicles Produced^{(1)}	Total Light Vehicles^{(1)} Produced (including exports)	Ethanol vehicles as % Total light vehicles^{(2)}
1979	4,614	—	1,022,083	0.5
1980	254,001	—	1,048,692	24.2
1983	590,915	—	854,761	69.1
1986	697,731	—	960,570	72.6
1988	569,189	—	978,519	58.2
1990	83,259	—	847,838	9.8
1993	264,651	—	1,324,665	20.0
1998	1,451	—	1,501,060	0.1
2000	10,106	—	1,596.882	0.6
2002	56,594	—	1,700,146	3.3
2003	34,919	49,264	1,721,841	4.9
2004	51,012	332,507	2,181,131	17.6
2005	51,476	857,899	2,377,453	38.2
2006	775	1,391,636	2,471,224	56.3
2007	3	1,936,931	2,803,919	69.1
2008	0	2,243,648	3,004,535	74.7
2009	0	2,541,153	3,024,755	84.0
2010	50	2,627,111	3,408,683	77.1
2011	51	2,848,071	3,425,674	83.1
Total 1979–2011	5,658,450	14,828,220	61,141,083	33.5
Source: ANFAVEA, 1979–2010, and Denatran/ANFAVEA 2011. Notes: (1) Flex-fuel motorcycles not included. (2) Total light vehicles include autos and light trucks built with diesel, gasoline, neat ethanol, and flexfuel engines.

As a response to the 1973 oil crisis, the Brazilian government began promoting bioethanol as a fuel. The National Alcohol Program -Pró-Álcool- (Portuguese: Programa Nacional do Álcool), launched in 1975, was a nationwide program financed by the government to phase out automobile fuels derived from fossil fuels, such as gasoline, in favor of ethanol produced from sugar cane. The decision to produce ethanol from sugarcane was based on the low cost of sugar at the time, the idle capacity for distillation at the sugar plants, and the country's tradition and experience with this feedstock. Other sources of fermentable carbohydrates were also explored such as manioc and other feedstocks. The first phase of the program concentrated in production of anhydrous ethanol for blending with gasoline.

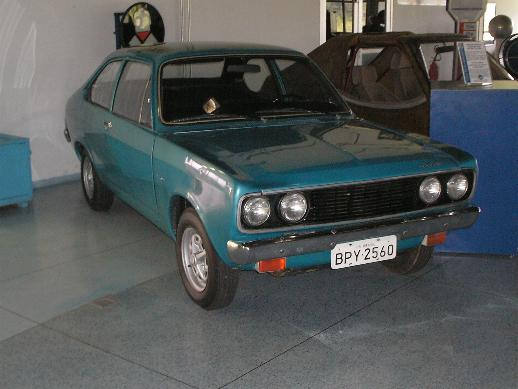
A Dodge 1800 was the first prototype engineered with a neat ethanol-only engine. Exhibit at the Memorial Aeroespacial Brasileiro, CTA, São José dos Campos.

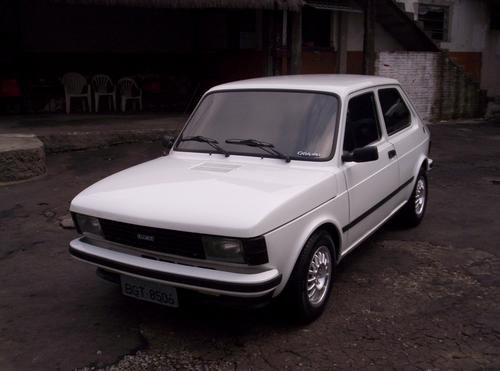
The Brazilian Fiat 147 was the first modern automobile launched to the market capable of running on neat hydrous ethanol fuel (E100).

After testing in government fleets with several prototypes developed by local subsidiaries of Fiat, Volkswagen, GM, and Ford, and compelled by the second oil crisis, the first 16 gasoline stations began supplying hydrous ethanol in May 1979 for a fleet of 2,000 neat ethanol adapted vehicles, and by July, the Fiat 147 was launched to the market, becoming the first modern commercial neat ethanol-powered car (E100) sold in the world. Brazilian carmakers modified gasoline engines to support hydrous ethanol characteristics. Changes included compression ratio, amount of fuel injected, replacement of materials subject to corrosion by ethanol, use of colder spark plugs suitable for dissipating heat due to higher flame temperatures, and an auxiliary cold-start system that injects gasoline from a small tank to aid cold starting. Six years later, approximately 75% of Brazilian passenger cars were manufactured with ethanol engines.

The Brazilian government also made mandatory the blend of ethanol fuel with gasoline, fluctuating from 1976 until 1992 between 10% and 22%. Due to this mandatory minimum gasoline blend, pure gasoline (E0) is no longer sold in the country. A federal law was passed in October 1993 establishing a mandatory blend of 22% anhydrous ethanol (E22) in the entire country. This law also authorized the Executive to set different percentages of ethanol within pre-established boundaries; since 2003 these limits were fixed at a maximum of 25% (E25) and a minimum of 20% (E20) by volume. Since then, the government has set the percentage on the ethanol blend according to the results of the sugarcane harvest and the levels of ethanol production from sugarcane, resulting in blend variations even within the same year.

Since July 2007, the mandatory blend was 25% of anhydrous ethanol and 75% gasoline or E25 blend. As a result of supply shortages and high ethanol fuel prices, in 2010 the government mandated a temporary 90-day blend reduction from E25 to E20 beginning February 1, 2010. As supply shortages took place again between the 2010–2011 harvest seasons, some ethanol was imported from the US, and in April 2011 the government reduced the minimum mandatory blend to 18 percent, leaving the mandatory blend range between E18 and E25.

By mid-March 2015, the government raised the ethanol blend in regular gasoline from 25% to 27%. The blend on premium gasoline was kept at 25% upon request by ANFAVEA, the Brazilian association of automakers, because of concerns about the effects on the higher blend on cars that were built only for E25 as the maximum blend, as opposed to flex-fuel cars. The government approved the higher blend as an economic incentive for ethanol producers, due to an existing overstock of over 1 billion liters (264 million US gallons) of ethanol. The implementation of E27 is expected to allow the consumption of the overstock before the end of 2015.

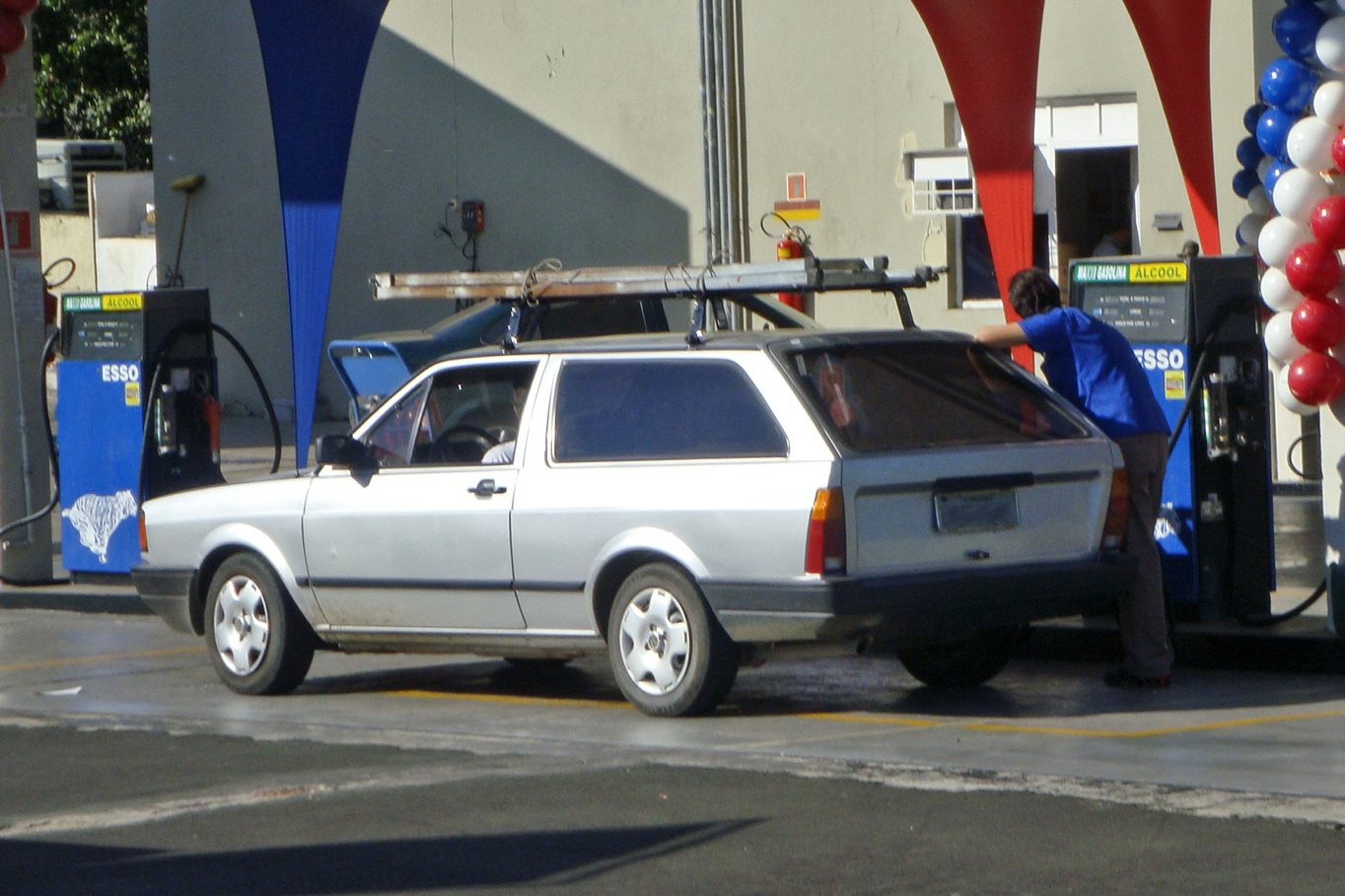
As of 2009 there are still neat ethanol cars running on Brazilian roads. Shown here a neat ethanol car fueling E100 at a Piracicaba gas station, São Paulo.

The Brazilian government provided three important initial motivators for the ethanol industry: guaranteed purchases by the state-owned oil company Petrobras, low-interest loans for agro-industrial ethanol firms, and fixed gasoline and ethanol prices where hydrous ethanol sold for 59% of the government-set gasoline price at the pump. These incentives made ethanol production competitive.

After reaching more than four million cars and light trucks running on pure ethanol by the late 1980s, representing 33% of the country's motor vehicle fleet, ethanol production and sales of neat ethanol cars tumbled due to several factors. First, gasoline prices fell sharply as a result of the 1980s oil glut. The inflation adjusted real 2004 dollar value of oil fell from an average of US$78.2 in 1981 to an average of US$26.8 per barrel in 1986. Also, by mid-1989, a shortage of ethanol fuel supply in the local market left thousands of vehicles in line at gas stations or out of fuel in their garages. At the time ethanol production was tightly regulated by the government, as well as pricing of both gasoline and ethanol fuel, the latter subject to fixed producer prices. As a complement, the government provided subsidies to guarantee a lower ethanol price at the pump as compared to gasoline, as consumers were promised that ethanol prices would never be higher than 65% the price of gasoline. As sugar prices sharply increased in the international market by the end of 1988 and the government did not set the sugar export quotas, production shifted heavily towards sugar production causing an ethanol supply shortage, as the real cost of ethanol was around US$45 per barrel. As ethanol production stagnated at 12 billion liters and could not keep pace with the increasing demand required by the now significant ethanol-only fleet, the Brazilian government began importing ethanol from Europe and Africa in 1991. Simultaneously, the government began reducing ethanol subsidies, thus marking the beginning of the industry's deregulation and the slow extinction of the Pró-Álcool Program.

In 1990, production of neat ethanol vehicles fell to 10.9% of the total car production as consumers lost confidence in the reliability of ethanol fuel supply, and began selling or converting their cars back to gasoline fuel. By the beginning of 1997 Fiat, Ford, and General Motors had all stopped producing ethanol powered cars, leaving only Volkswagen (who offered the Gol, Santana, Kombi and their derivatives). The manufacturers requested a reinstatement of a stable gasohol program and promised to develop products by 1999.

== The Flex-fuel era ==
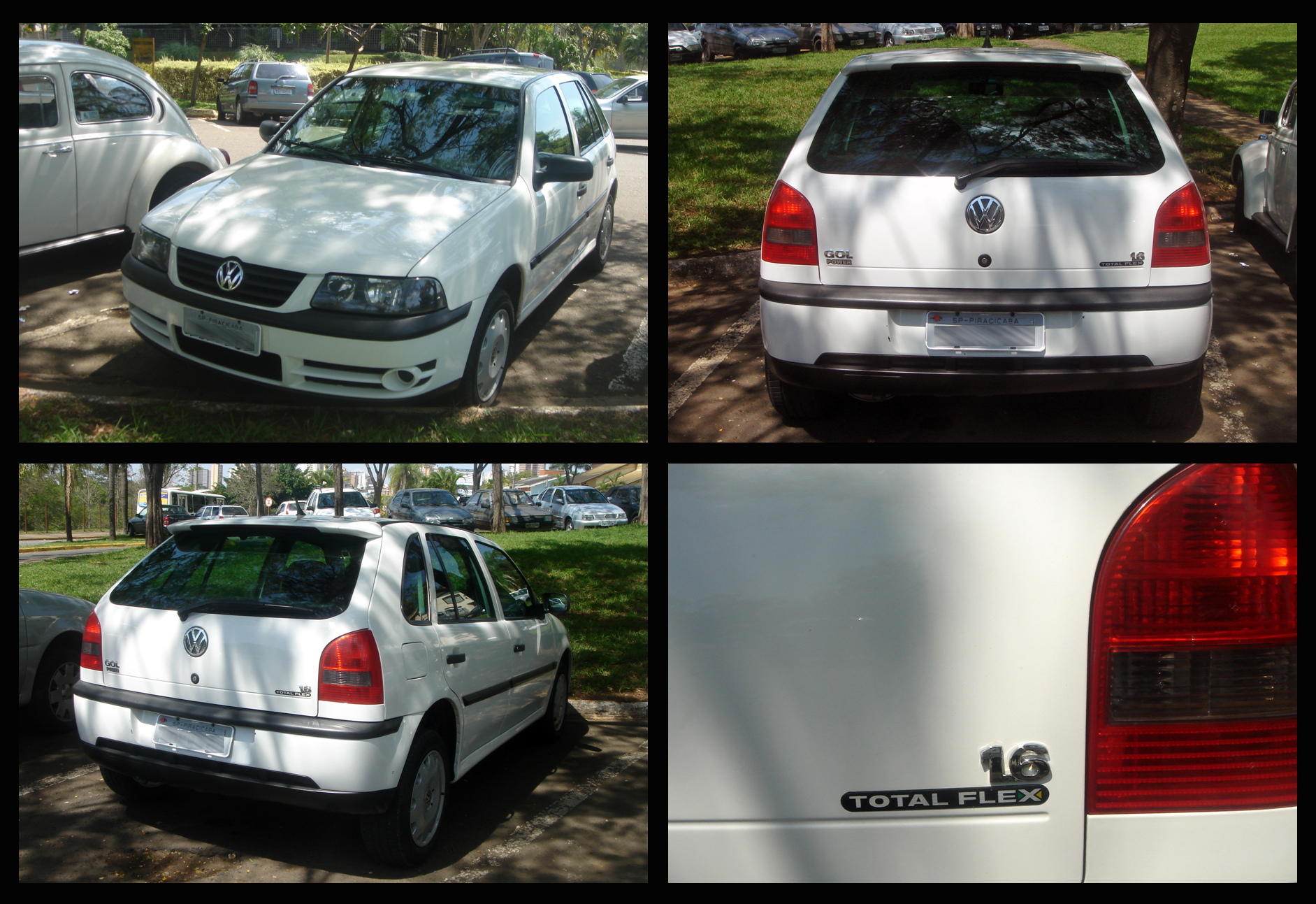
The 2003 Brazilian VW Gol 1.6 Total Flex was the first flexible-fuel car capable of running on any blend of gasoline and ethanol.

Confidence in ethanol-powered vehicles was restored with the introduction in the Brazilian market of flexible-fuel vehicles starting in 2003. A key innovation in the Brazilian flex technology was avoiding the need for an additional dedicated sensor to monitor the ethanol-gasoline mix, which made the first American M85 flex fuel vehicles too expensive. This was accomplished through the lambda probe, used to measure the quality of combustion in conventional engines, is also required to tell the engine control unit (ECU) which blend of gasoline and alcohol is being burned. This task is accomplished automatically through software developed by Brazilian engineers, called "Software Fuel Sensor" (SFS), fed with data from the standard sensors already built-in the vehicle. The technology was developed by the Brazilian subsidiary of Bosch in 1994, but was further improved and commercially implemented in 2003 by the Italian subsidiary of Magneti Marelli. A similar fuel injection technology was developed by the Brazilian subsidiary of Delphi Automotive Systems, and it is called "Multifuel." This technology allows the controller to regulate the amount of fuel injected and spark time, as fuel flow needs to be decreased and also self-combustion needs to be avoided when gasoline is used because ethanol engines have compression ratio around 12:1, too high for gasoline.

In March 2003, Volkswagen launched in the Brazilian market the Gol 1.6 Total Flex, the first commercial flexible fuel vehicle capable of running on any blend of gasoline and ethanol. Chevrolet followed three months later with the Corsa 1.8 Flexpower, using an engine developed by a joint-venture with Fiat called PowerTrain. That year production of full flex-fuel reached 39,853 automobiles and 9,411 light commercial vehicles. By 2008, popular manufacturers that build flexible fuel vehicles are Chevrolet, Fiat, Ford, Peugeot, Renault, Volkswagen, Honda, Mitsubishi, Toyota and Citroën. Nissan launched its first flex fuel in the Brazilian market in 2009 and Kia Motors in 2010. Flexible-fuel vehicles were 22% of the car sales in 2004, 73% in 2005, 87.6% in July 2008, and reached a record 94% in August 2009. The production of flex-fuel cars and light commercial vehicles reached the milestone of 10 million vehicles in March 2010, and 15.3 million units by March 2012. As of December 2011, the fleet of flex automobiles and light commercial vehicles had reached 14.8 million vehicles, representing 21% of Brazil's motor vehicle fleet and 31.8% of all registered light vehicles.

This rapid adoption of the flex technology was facilitated by the fuel distribution infrastructure already in place, as around 27,000 filling stations countrywide were available by 1997 with at least one ethanol pump, a heritage of the Pró-Álcool program, and by October 2008 have reached 35,000 fueling stations.

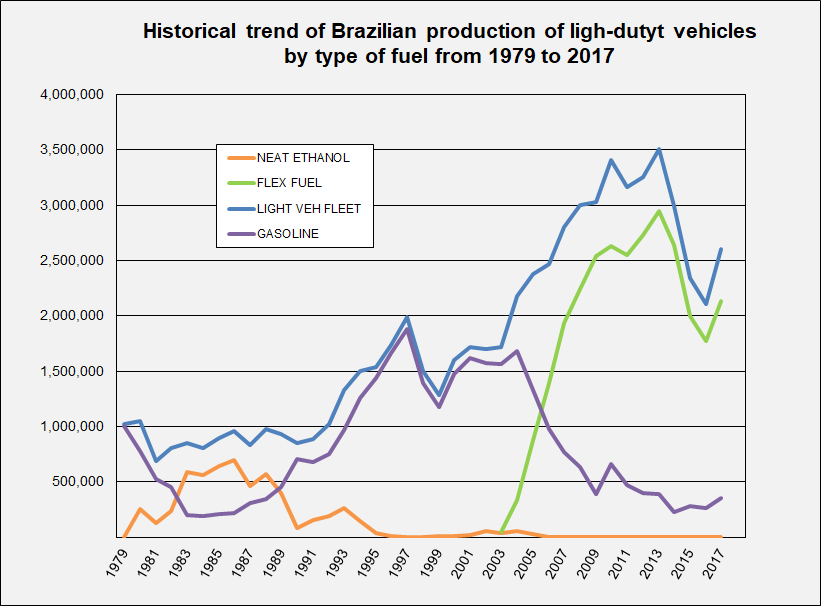
Historical trend of Brazilian production of light vehicles by type of fuel, neat ethanol (alcohol), flex fuel, and gasoline vehicles from 1979 to 2017.

The flexibility of Brazilian FFVs empowered the consumers to choose the fuel depending on current market prices. The rapid adoption and commercial success of "flex" vehicles, as they are popularly known, together with the mandatory blend of alcohol with gasoline as E25 fuel, have increased ethanol consumption up to the point that during the first two months of 2008 ethanol consumption increased by 56% when compared to the same period in 2007, and achieving a landmark in ethanol consumption in February 2008, when ethanol retail sales surpassed the 50% market share of the gasoline-powered fleet. This level of ethanol fuel consumption had not been reached since the end of the 80s, at the peak of the Pró-Álcool Program. According to two separate research studies conducted in 2009, at the national level 65% of the flex-fuel registered vehicles regularly use ethanol fuel, and all-year-long by 93% of flex car owners in São Paulo, the main ethanol producer state where local taxes are lower, and prices at the pump are more competitive than gasoline.

Between 1979 and 2011, Brazil substituted around 22 million pure gasoline-powered vehicles with 5.7 million neat ethanol vehicles, 14.8 million flex-fuel vehicles and almost 1.5 million flex motorcycles. The number of neat ethanol vehicles still in use by 2003 was estimated between 2 and 3 million vehicles, and 1.22 million as of December 2011. There were 80 flex car and light truck models available in the market manufactured by 12 major carmakers by December 2011, and four flex-fuel motorcycle models available.

The early technology in flex fuel engines had a fuel economy with hydrated ethanol (E100) that was 25 to 35% lower than gasoline, but flex engines are now being designed with higher compression ratios, taking advantage of the higher ethanol blends and maximizing the benefits of the higher oxygen content of ethanol, resulting in lower emissions and improving fuel efficiency, allowing flex engines in 2008 models to reduce the fuel economy gap to 20 to 25% that of gasoline.

== Latest developments ==
=== Ethanol-powered diesel engine ===
Under the auspices of the BioEthanol for Sustainable Transport (BEST) project, the first ethanol-powered (E95 or ED95) bus began operations in São Paulo city in December 2007 as a one-year trial project. The bus is a Scania model with a modified diesel engine capable of running with 95% hydrous ethanol blended with a 5% ignition improver, with a Marcopolo body. Scania adjusted the compression ratio from 18:1 to 28:1, added larger fuel injection nozzles, and altered the injection timing.

During the trial period performance and emissions were monitored by the National Reference Center on Biomass (CENBIO - Portuguese: Centro Nacional de Referência em Biomassa) at the Universidade de São Paulo, and compared with similar diesel models, with special attention to carbon monoxide and particulate matter emissions. Performance is also important as previous tests have shown a reduction in fuel economy of around 60% when E95 is compared to regular diesel.

In November 2009, a second ED95 bus began operating in São Paulo city. The bus was a Swedish Scania with a Brazilian CAIO body. The second bus was scheduled to operate between Lapa and Vila Mariana, passing through Avenida Paulista, one of the main business centers of São Paulo city. The two test buses operated regularly for 3 years.

In November 2010 the municipal government of São Paulo city signed an agreement with UNICA, Cosan, Scania and Viação Metropolitana", the local bus operator, to introduce a fleet of 50 ethanol-powered ED95 buses by May 2011. The city's government objective is to reduce the carbon footprint of the city's bus fleet of 15,000 diesel-powered buses, with a final goal that the entire bus fleet use only renewable fuels by 2018. Scania will manufacture the buses in its plant located in São Bernardo do Campo, São Paulo. These buses use the same technology and fuel as the 700 buses manufactured by Scania and already operating in Stockholm.

The first ethanol-powered buses were delivered in May 2011, and the 50 buses will start regular service in June 2011. The fleet of 50 ethanol-powered ED95 buses had a cost of R$ 20 million (US$12.3 million) and due to the higher cost of the ED95 fuel, one of the firms participating in the cooperation agreement, Raísen (a joint venture between Royal Dutch Shell and Cosan), will supply the fuel to the municipality at 70% the market price of regular diesel.

=== Flex-fuel motorcycles ===
Ethanol flex-fuel motorcycle manufacturing in Brazil 2009–2011
Year	Flex motor- cycles produced	Total motor- cycles produced	Flex as % total
2009	188,494	1,539,473	12.2
2010	332,351	1,830,614	18.1
2011	956,117	1,687,436	56.7
Total 2009-11	1,476,962	5,057,523	29.2

The latest innovation within the Brazilian flexible-fuel technology is the development of flex-fuel motorcycles. In 2007 Magneti Marelli presented the first motorcycle with flex technology. Delphi Automotive Systems also presented in 2007 its own injection technology for motorcycles. Besides the flexibility in the choice of fuels, a main objective of the fuel-flex motorcycles is to reduce CO_{2} emissions by 20 percent, and savings in fuel consumption in the order of 5% to 10% are expected.

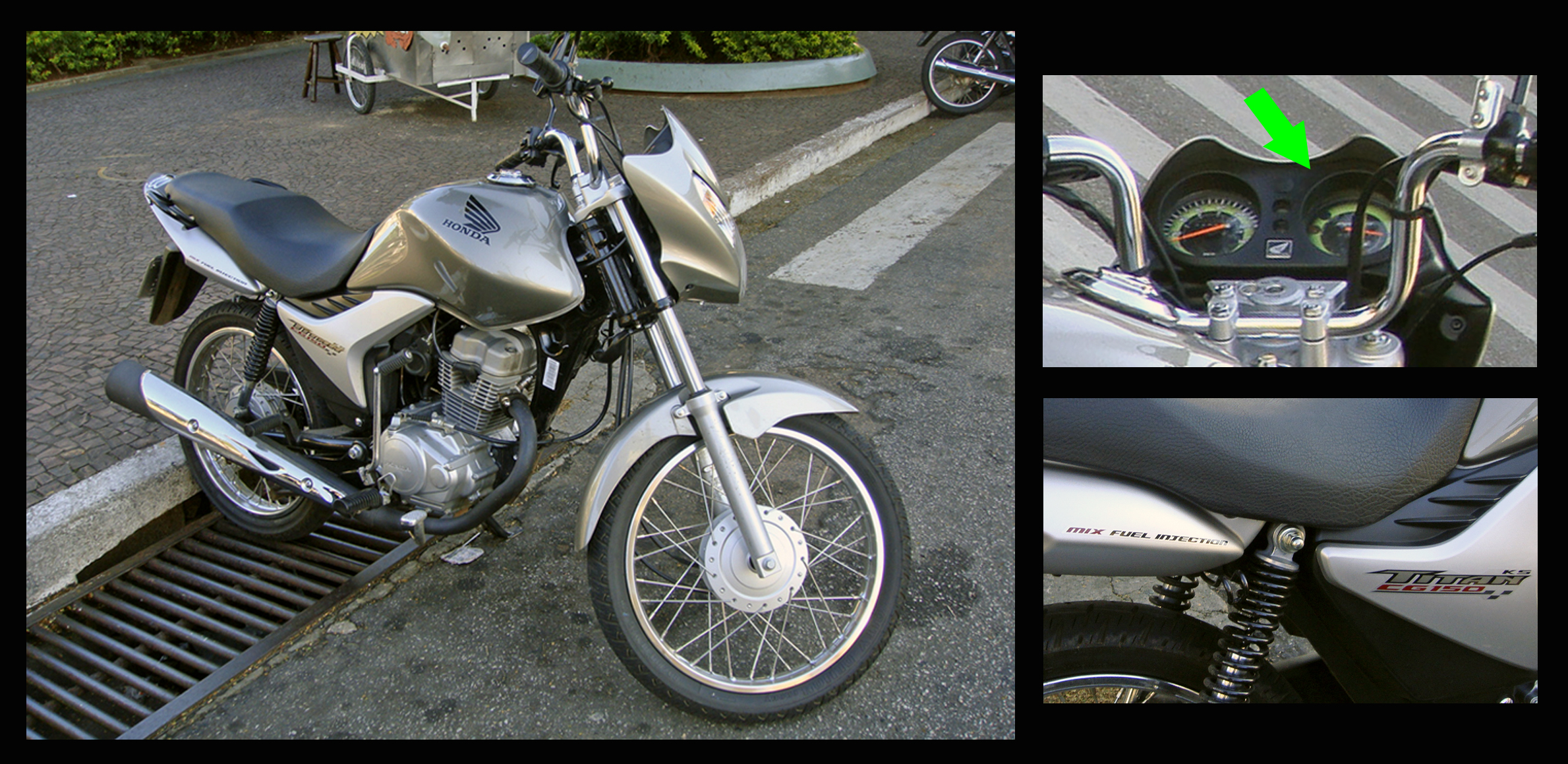
The 2009 Honda CG 150 Titan Mix was launched in the Brazilian market and became the first flex-fuel motorcycle sold in the world.

The first flex fuel motorcycle was launched to the Brazilian market by Honda in March 2009. Produced by its local subsidiary Moto Honda da Amazônia, the CG 150 Titan Mix is sold for around US$2,700. Because the motorcycle does not have a secondary gas tank for a cold start like the Brazilian flex cars do, the fuel tank must have at least 20% of gasoline to avoid start up problems at temperatures below 15 °C (59 °F). The motorcycle's panel includes a gauge to warn the driver about the actual ethanol-gasoline mix in the storage tank. During the first eight months after its market launch the CG 150 Titan Mix has sold 139,059 motorcycles, capturing a 10.6% market share, and ranking second in sales of new motorcycles in the Brazilian market in 2009.

In September 2009, Honda launched a second flexible-fuel motorcycle, the on-off-road NXR 150 Bros Mix. By December 2010 both Honda flexible-fuel motorcycles had reached cumulative production of 515,726 units, representing an 18.1% market share of the Brazilian new motorcycle sales in that year. As of January 2011 there were four flex-fuel motorcycle models available in the market. During 2011 a total of 956,117 flex-fuel motorcycles were produced, raising its market share to 56.7%. Since their inception in 2009 almost 1.5 million flexible-fuel motorcycles had been produced in the country through December 2011, and the two million mark was reached in August 2012.

=== New generation of flex engines ===
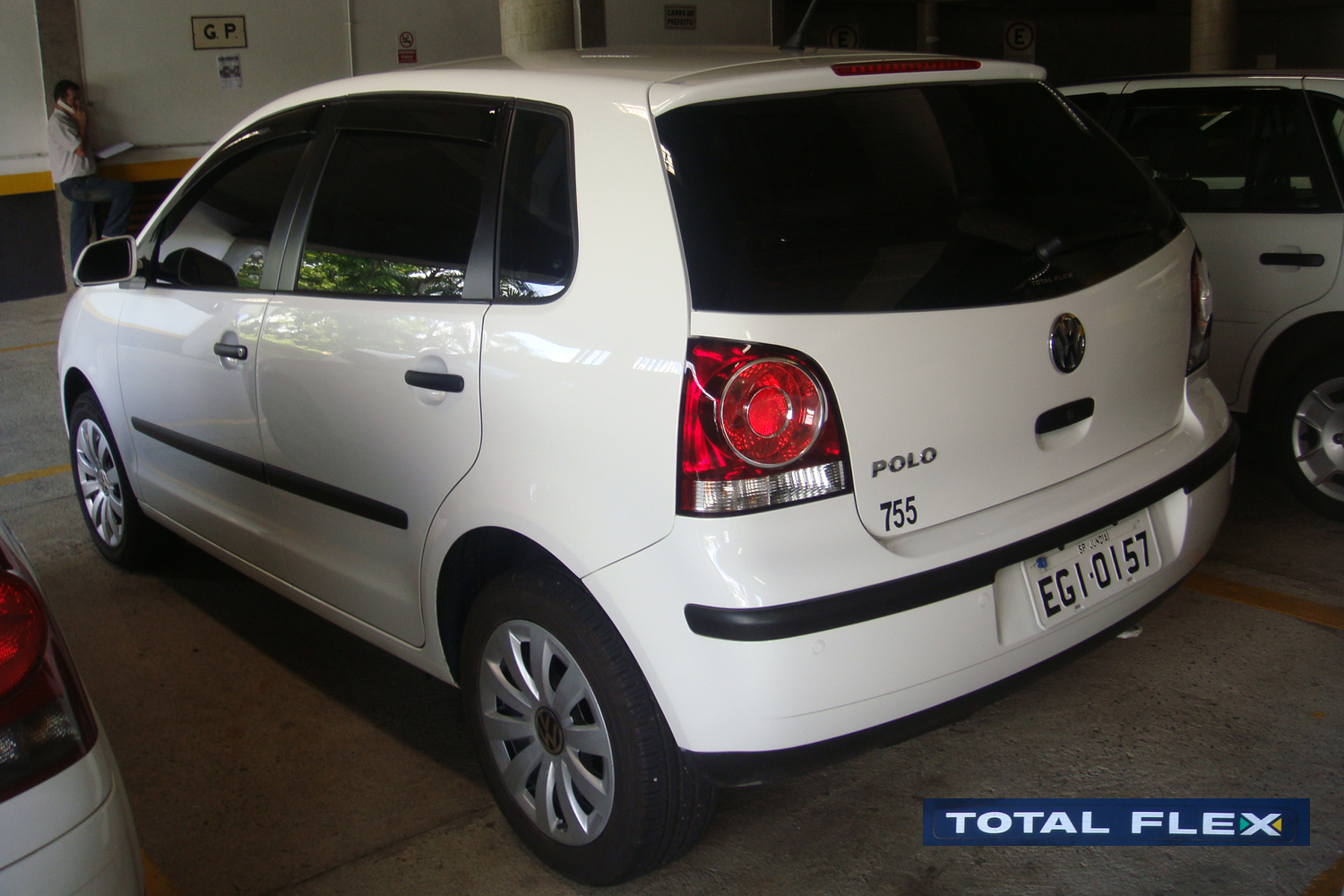
The Brazilian Volkswagen Polo E-Flex 2009 was the first flex fuel model without an auxiliary tank for cold start.

The Brazilian subsidiaries of Magneti Marelli, Delphi and Bosch have developed and announced the introduction in 2009 of a new flex engine generation that eliminates the need for the secondary gasoline tank by warming the ethanol fuel during starting, and allowing flex vehicles to do a normal cold start at temperatures as low as −5 °C (23 °F), the lowest temperature expected anywhere in the Brazilian territory. Another improvement is the reduction of fuel consumption and tailpipe emissions, between 10% and 15% as compared to flex motors sold in 2008. In March 2009 Volkswagen do Brasil launched the Polo E-Flex, the first flex fuel model without an auxiliary tank for cold start. The Flex Start system used by the Polo was developed by Bosch.

== 2009–2013 supply shortage ==
Since 2009, the Brazilian ethanol industry has experienced financial stress due to the credit crunch caused by the 2008 financial crisis; poor sugarcane harvests due to unfavorable weather; high sugar prices in the world market that made more attractive to produce sugar rather than ethanol; and other domestic factors that resulted in a decline of its annual production despite a growing demand in the local market. Brazilian ethanol fuel production in 2011 was 21.1 million liters (5.6 billion U.S. liquid gallons), down from 26.2 million liters (6.9 billion gallons) in 2010. A supply shortage took place for several months during 2010 and 2011, and prices climbed to the point that ethanol fuel was no longer attractive for owners of flex-fuel vehicles; the government reduced the minimum ethanol blend in gasoline to reduce demand and keep ethanol fuel prices from rising further; and for the first time since the 1990s, ethanol fuel was imported from the United States.

As a result of higher ethanol prices caused by the Brazilian ethanol industry crisis, combined with government subsidies set to keep gasoline price lower than the international market value, by November 2013 only 23% flex-fuel car owners were using ethanol regularly, down from 66% in 2009.

== See also ==
- Alternative fuel vehicle
- Ethanol fuel
- Ethanol fuel in the United States
- Flexible-fuel vehicles in the United States
