= Flexible-fuel vehicle =

Vehicle that runs on multiple fuels

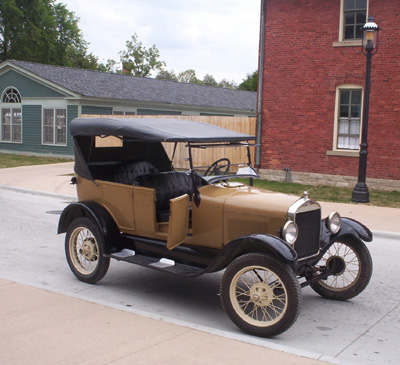
The Ford Model T's engine was capable of running on ethanol, gasoline, kerosene, or a mixture of the first two.

A flexible-fuel vehicle (FFV) or dual-fuel vehicle (colloquially called a flex-fuel vehicle) is an alternative fuel vehicle with an internal combustion engine designed to run on more than one fuel, usually gasoline blended with either ethanol or methanol fuel, and both fuels are stored in the same common tank. Modern flex-fuel engines are capable of burning any proportion of the resulting blend in the combustion chamber as fuel injection and spark timing are adjusted automatically according to the actual blend detected by a fuel composition sensor. Flex-fuel vehicles are distinguished from bi-fuel vehicles, where two fuels are stored in separate tanks and the engine runs on one fuel at a time, for example, compressed natural gas (CNG), liquefied petroleum gas (LPG), or hydrogen.

The most common commercially available FFV in the world market is the ethanol flexible-fuel vehicle, with about 60 million automobiles, motorcycles and light duty trucks manufactured and sold worldwide by March 2018, and concentrated in four markets, Brazil (30.5 million light-duty vehicles and over 6 million motorcycles), the United States (27 million by the end of 2021), Canada (1.6 million by 2014), and Europe, led by Sweden (243,100). In addition to flex-fuel vehicles running with ethanol, in Europe and the US, mainly in California, there have been successful test programs with methanol flex-fuel vehicles, known as M85 flex-fuel vehicles. There have been also successful tests using P-series fuels with E85 flex fuel vehicles, but as of September 2025, this fuel is not yet available to the general public. These successful tests with P-series fuels were conducted on Ford Taurus and Dodge Caravan flexible-fuel vehicles.

Though technology exists to allow ethanol FFVs to run on any mixture of gasoline and ethanol, from pure gasoline up to 100% ethanol (E100), North American and European flex-fuel vehicles are optimized to run on E85, a blend of 85% anhydrous ethanol fuel with 15% gasoline. This upper limit in the ethanol content is set to reduce ethanol emissions at low temperatures and to avoid cold starting problems during cold weather, at temperatures lower than 11 °C (52 °F). The alcohol content is reduced during the winter in regions where temperatures fall below 0 °C (32 °F) to a winter blend of E70 in the U.S. or to E75 in Sweden from November until March. Brazilian flex fuel vehicles are optimized to run on any mix of E20-E25 gasoline and up to 100% hydrous ethanol fuel (E100). The Brazilian flex vehicles were built-in with a small gasoline reservoir for cold starting the engine when temperatures drop below 15 °C (59 °F). An improved flex motor generation was launched in 2009 which eliminated the need for the secondary gas tank.

== Terminology ==
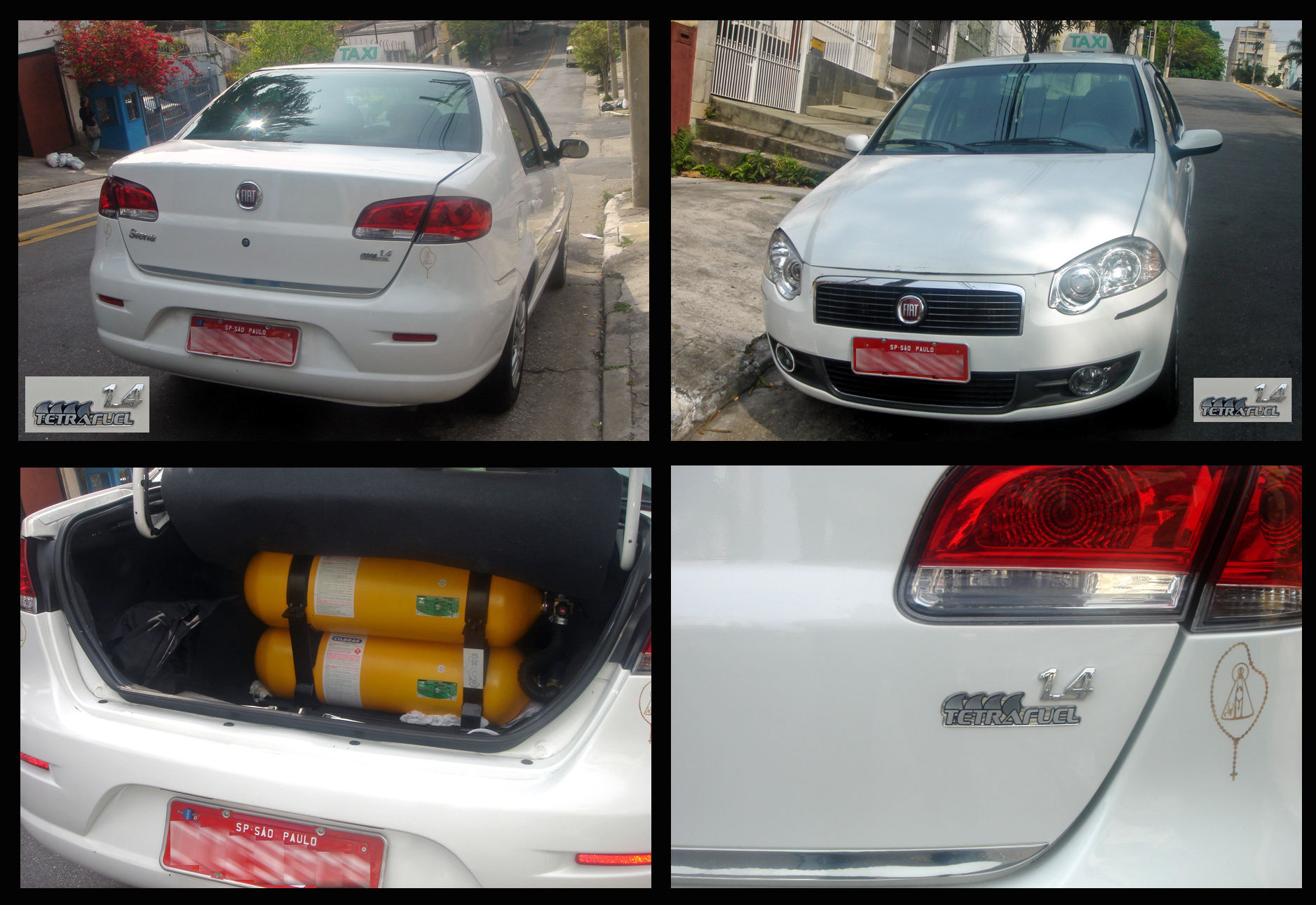
The Fiat Siena Tetrafuel 1.4 is a multifuel car designed to run as a flex-fuel on pure gasoline, or E20-E25 blend, or pure ethanol (E100); or to run as a bi-fuel with natural gas (CNG).

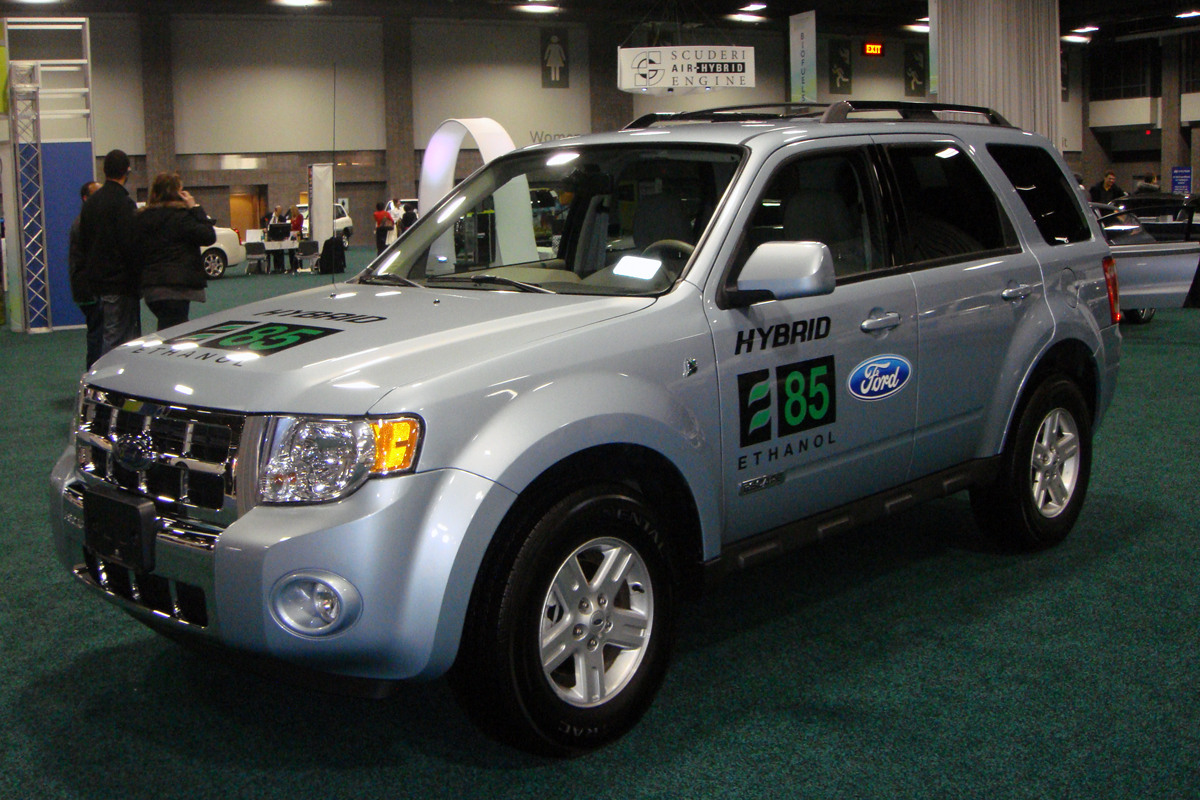
Demonstration E85 flex-fuel Ford Escape Hybrid

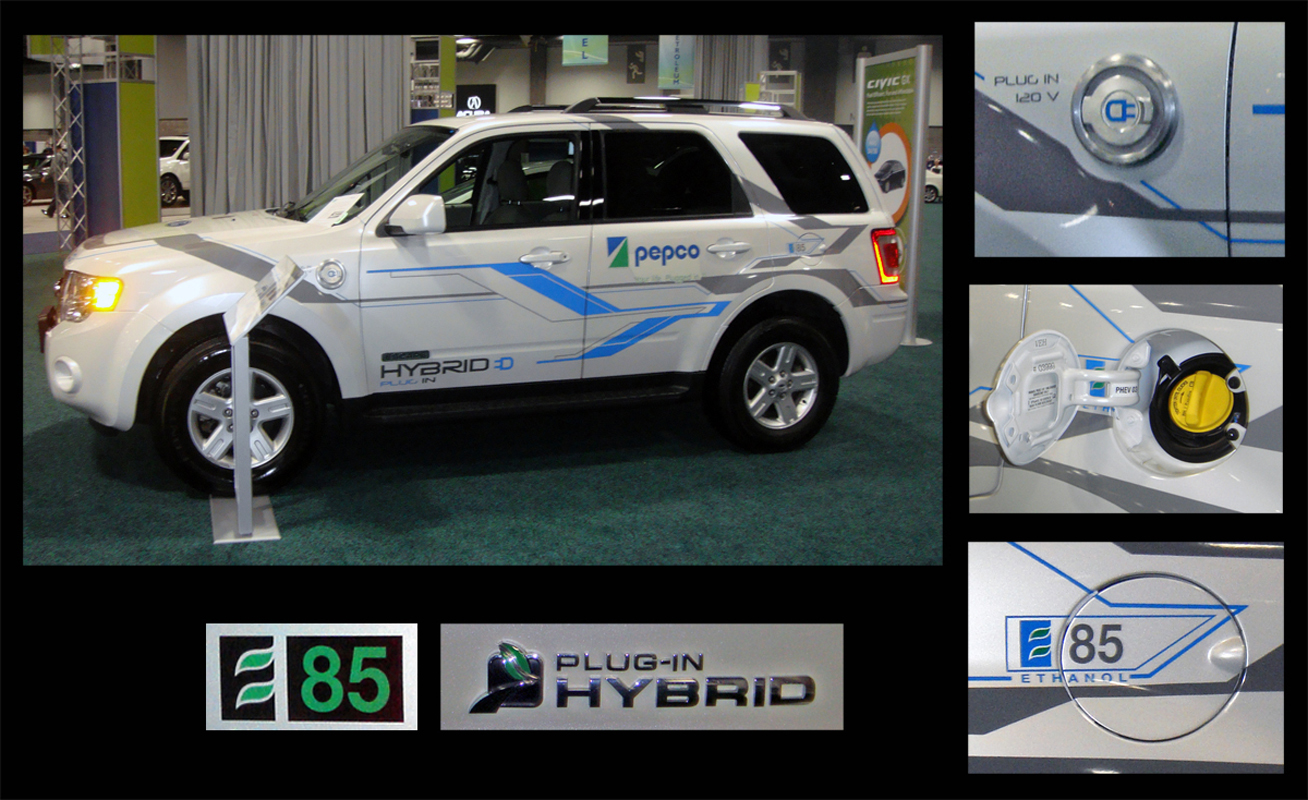
Demonstration Ford Escape E85 flex-fuel plug-in hybrid

As ethanol FFVs became commercially available during the late 1990s, the common use of the term "flexible-fuel vehicle" became synonymous with ethanol FFVs. In the United States flex-fuel vehicles are also known as "E85 vehicles". In Brazil, the FFVs are popularly known as "total flex" or simply "flex" cars. In Europe, FFVs are also known as "flexifuel" vehicles. Automakers, particularly in Brazil and the European market, use badging in their FFV models with the some variant of the word "flex", such as Volvo Flexifuel, or Volkswagen Total Flex, or Chevrolet FlexPower or Renault Hi-Flex, and Ford sells its Focus model in Europe as Flexifuel and as Flex in Brazil. In the US, only since 2008 FFV models feature a yellow gas cap with the label "E85/Gasoline" written on the top of the cap to differentiate E85s from gasoline only models.

Flexible-fuel vehicles (FFVs) are based on dual-fuel systems that supply both fuels into the combustion chamber at the same time in various calibrated proportions. The most common fuels used by FFVs today are unleaded gasoline and ethanol fuel. Ethanol FFVs can run on pure gasoline, pure ethanol (E100) or any combination of both. Methanol has also been blended with gasoline in flex-fuel vehicles known as M85 FFVs, but their use has been limited mainly to demonstration projects and small government fleets, particularly in California.

- Bi-fuel vehicles. The term flexible-fuel vehicles is sometimes used to include other alternative fuel vehicles that can run with compressed natural gas (CNG), liquefied petroleum gas (LPG; also known as autogas), or hydrogen. However, all these vehicles actually are bi-fuel and not flexible-fuel vehicles, because they have engines that store the other fuel in a separate tank, and the engine runs on one fuel at a time. Bi-fuel vehicles have the capability to switch back and forth from gasoline to the other fuel, manually or automatically. The most common available fuel in the market for bi-fuel cars is natural gas (CNG), and by 2008 there were 9.6 million natural gas vehicles, led by Pakistan (2.0 million), Argentina (1.7 million), and Brazil (1.6 million). Natural gas vehicles are a popular choice as taxicabs in the main cities of Argentina and Brazil. Normally, standard gasoline vehicles are retrofitted in specialized shops, which involve installing the gas cylinder in the trunk and the CNG injection system and electronics.
- Multifuel vehicles are capable of operating with more than two fuels. In 2004 GM do Brasil introduced the Chevrolet Astra 2.0 with a "MultiPower" engine built on flex fuel technology developed by Bosch of Brazil, and capable of using CNG, ethanol and gasoline (E20-E25 blend) as fuel. This automobile was aimed at the taxicab market and the switch among fuels is done manually. In 2006 Fiat introduced the Fiat Siena Tetra fuel, a four-fuel car developed under Magneti Marelli of Fiat Brazil. This automobile can run as a flex-fuel on 100% ethanol (E100); or on E-20 to E25, Brazil's normal ethanol gasoline blend; on pure gasoline (though no longer available in Brazil since 1993, it is still used in neighboring countries); or just on natural gas. The Siena Tetrafuel was engineered to switch from any gasoline-ethanol blend to CNG automatically, depending on the power required by road conditions. Another existing option is to retrofit an ethanol flexible-fuel vehicle to add a natural gas tank and the corresponding injection system. This option is popular among taxicab owners in São Paulo and Rio de Janeiro, Brazil, allowing users to choose among three fuels (E25, E100 and CNG) according to current market prices at the pump. Vehicles with this adaptation are known in Brazil as "tri-fuel" cars.
- Flex-fuel hybrid electric and flex-fuel plug-in hybrid are two types of hybrid vehicles built with a combustion engine capable of running on gasoline, E-85, or E-100 to help drive the wheels in conjunction with the electric engine or to recharge the battery pack that powers the electric engine. In 2007 Ford produced 20 demonstration Escape Hybrid E85s for real-world testing in fleets in the U.S. Also as a demonstration project, Ford delivered in 2008 the first flexible-fuel plug-in hybrid SUV to the U.S. Department of Energy (DOE), a Ford Escape Plug-in Hybrid, which runs on gasoline or E85. GM announced that the Chevrolet Volt plug-in hybrid, launched in the U.S. in late 2010, would be the first commercially available flex-fuel plug-in capable of adapting the propulsion to several world markets such as the U.S., Brazil or Sweden, as the combustion engine can be adapted to run on E85, E100 or diesel respectively. The Volt was initially expected to be flex-fuel-capable in 2013, but it was not produced. Lotus Engineering unveiled the Lotus CityCar at the 2010 Paris Motor Show. The CityCar is a plug-in hybrid concept car designed for flex-fuel operation on ethanol, or methanol as well as regular gasoline.
- In December 2018, Toyota do Brasil announced the development of the world's first commercial hybrid electric car with flex-fuel engine capable of running with electricity and any blend of ethanol fuel and gasoline. The flexible fuel hybrid technology was developed in partnership with several Brazilian federal universities, and a prototype was tested for six months using a Toyota Prius as development mule. Toyota announced plans to start production of a flex hybrid electric car for the Brazilian market in the second half of 2019.

== History ==
The Ford Model T, produced from 1908 through 1927, was fitted with a carburetor with adjustable jetting, allowing use of ethanol, gasoline or kerosene (each by itself), or a combination of the first two mentioned fuels. Other car manufacturers also provided engines for ethanol fuel use. Henry Ford continued to advocate for ethanol as fuel even during Prohibition. However, cheaper oil caused gasoline to prevail, until the 1973 oil crisis resulted in gasoline shortages and awareness on the dangers of oil dependence. This crisis opened a new opportunity for ethanol and other alternative fuels, such as methanol, gaseous fuels such as CNG and LPG, and also hydrogen. Ethanol, methanol and natural gas were the three alternative fuels that received more attention for research and development, and government support.

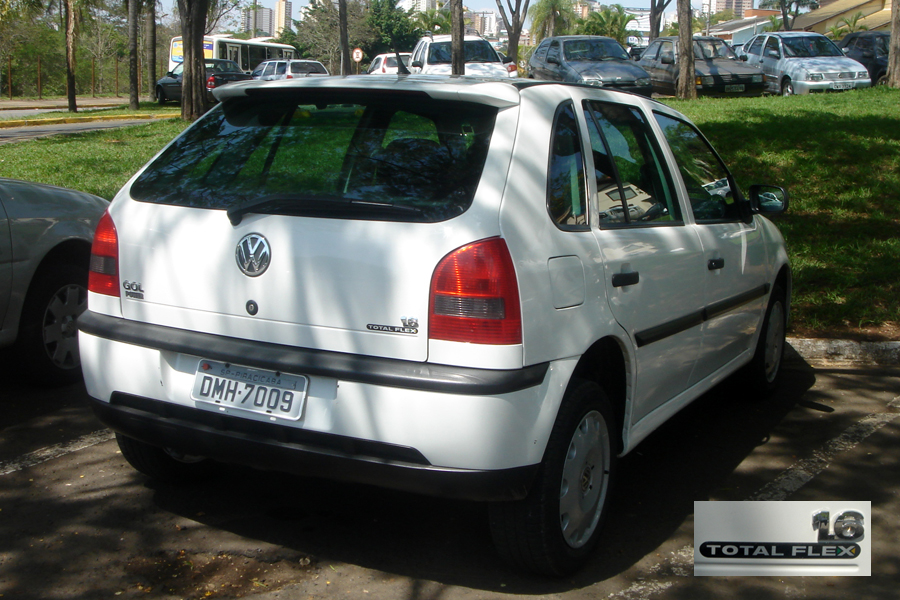
The 2003 VW Gol 1.6 Total Flex was the first full flexible-fuel vehicle produced and sold in Brazil, capable of running on any blend of gasoline (E20 to E25) and ethanol up to E100.

Since 1975, and as a response to the shock caused by the first oil crisis, the Brazilian government implemented the National Alcohol Program -Pró-Álcool- (Portuguese: Programa Nacional do Álcool), a nationwide program financed by the government to phase out automotive fuels derived from fossil fuels in favor of ethanol made from sugar cane. It began with a low blend of anhydrous alcohol with regular gasoline in 1976, and since July 2007 the mandatory blend is 25% of alcohol or gasohol E25. In 1979, and as a response to the second oil crisis, the first vehicle capable of running with pure hydrous ethanol (E100) was launched to the market, the Fiat 147, after testing with several prototypes developed by Fiat, Volkswagen, GM and Ford. The Brazilian government provided three important initial drivers for the ethanol industry: guaranteed purchases by the state-owned oil company Petrobras, low-interest loans for agro-industrial ethanol firms, and fixed gasoline and ethanol prices. After reaching more than 4 million cars and light trucks running on pure ethanol by the late 1980s, the use of E100-only vehicles sharply declined after increases in sugar prices produced shortages of ethanol fuel.

After extensive research that began in the 90s, a second push took place in March 2003, when the Brazilian subsidiary of Volkswagen launched to the market the first full flexible-fuel car, the Gol 1.6 Total Flex. Several months later was followed by other Brazilian automakers, and by 2010 General Motors, Fiat, Ford, Peugeot, Renault, Volkswagen, Honda, Mitsubishi, Toyota, Citroën, Nissan and Kia Motors were producing popular models of flex cars and light trucks. The adoption of ethanol flex fuel vehicles was so successful, that production of flex cars went from almost 40 thousand in 2003 to 1.7 million in 2007. This rapid adoption of the flex technology was facilitated by the fuel distribution infrastructure already in place, as around 27,000 filling stations countrywide were available by 1997 with at least one ethanol pump, a heritage of the Pró-Álcool program.

In the United States, initial support to develop alternative fuels by the government was also a response to the first oil crisis, and some time later, as a goal to improve air quality. Also, liquid fuels were preferred over gaseous fuels not only because they have a better volumetric energy density but also because they were the most compatible fuels with existing distribution systems and engines, thus avoiding a big departure from the existing technologies and taking advantage of the vehicle and the refueling infrastructure. California led the search of sustainable alternatives with interest focused in methanol. Ford Motor Company and other automakers responded to California's request for vehicles that run on methanol. In 1981, Ford delivered 40 dedicated methanol fuel (M100) Escorts to Los Angeles County, but only four refueling stations were installed. The biggest challenge in the development of alcohol vehicle technology was getting all of the fuel system materials compatible with the higher chemical reactivity of the fuel. Methanol was even more of a challenge than ethanol but much of the early experience gained with neat ethanol vehicle production in Brazil was transferable to methanol. The success of this small experimental fleet of M100s led California to request more of these vehicles, mainly for government fleets. In 1983, Ford built 582 M100 vehicles; 501 went to California, and the remaining to New Zealand, Sweden, Norway, United Kingdom, and Canada.

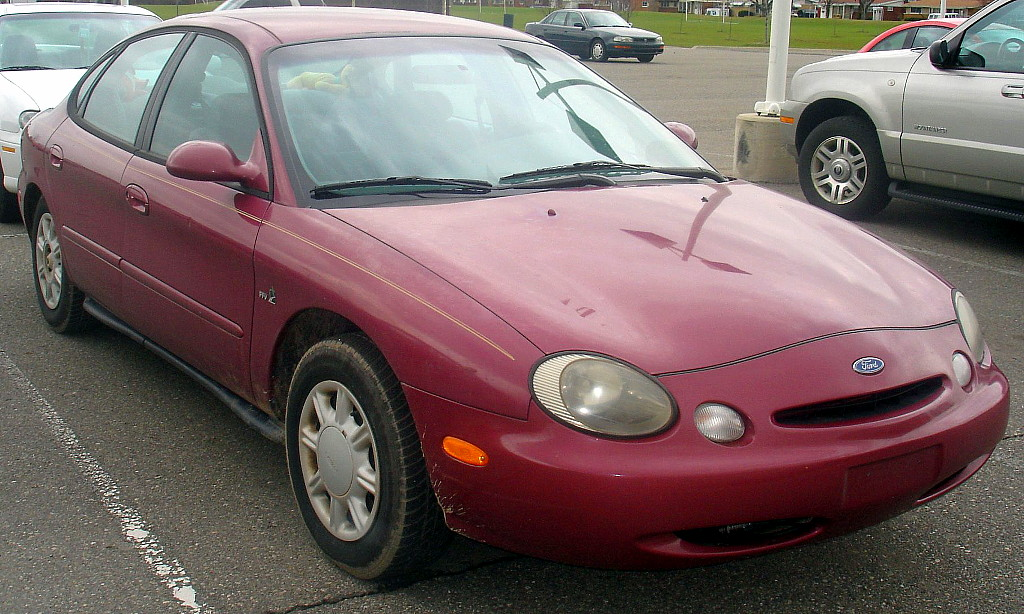
The 1996 Ford Taurus was the first flexible-fuel vehicle produced with versions capable of running with either ethanol (E85) or methanol (M85) blended with gasoline.

As an answer to the lack of refueling infrastructure, Ford began development of a flexible-fuel vehicle in 1982, and between 1985 and 1992, 705 experimental FFVs were built and delivered to California and Canada, including the 1.6L Ford Escort, the 3.0L Taurus, and the 5.0L LTD Crown Victoria. These vehicles could operate on either gasoline or methanol with only one fuel system. Legislation was passed to encourage the US auto industry to begin production, which started in 1993 for the M85 FFVs at Ford. In 1996, a new FFV Ford Taurus was developed, with models fully capable of running on either methanol or ethanol blended with gasoline. This ethanol version of the Taurus became the first commercial production of an E85 FFV. The momentum of the FFV production programs at the American car companies continued, although by the end of the 1990s, the emphasis shifted to the FFV E85 version, as it is today. Ethanol was preferred over methanol because there is a large support from the farming community, and thanks to the government's incentive programs and corn-based ethanol subsidies available at the time. Sweden also tested both the M85 and the E85 flexifuel vehicles, but due to agriculture policy, in the end emphasis was given to the ethanol flexifuel vehicles. Support for ethanol also comes from the fact that it is a biomass fuel, which addresses climate change concerns and greenhouse gas emissions, though nowadays these benefits are questioned and depend on the feedstock used for ethanol production and their indirect land use change impacts.

The demand for ethanol fuel produced from field corn in the United States was stimulated by the discovery in the late 90s that methyl tertiary butyl ether (MTBE), an oxygenate additive in gasoline, was contaminating groundwater. Due to the risks of widespread and costly litigation, and because MTBE use in gasoline was banned in almost 20 states by 2006, the substitution of MTBE opened a new market for ethanol fuel. This demand shift for ethanol as an oxygenate additive took place at a time when oil prices were already significantly rising. By 2006, about 50 percent of the gasoline used in the U.S. contained ethanol at different proportions, and ethanol production grew so fast that the US became the world's top ethanol producer, overtaking Brazil in 2005. This shift also contributed to a sharp increase in the production and sale of E85 flex vehicles since 2002.

== Flexible-fuel vehicles by country ==
=== Brazil ===
Ethanol flex-fuel motor vehicle production in Brazil 2003–2017^{(1)(2)}
Year	Total flex-fuel light-duty vehicles produced	Flex vehicles as % total light vehicles^{(1)(2)}	Flex motor- cycles produced	Flex motor- cycles as % total
2003	49,264	2.9		
2004	332,507	15.2		
2005	880,941	36.7		
2006	1,392,055	56.4		
2007	1,936,931	69.1		
2008	2,243,648	74.7		
2009	2,541,153	84.0	188,494	12.2
2010	2,627,111	77.1	332,351	18.2
2011	2,550,782	80.7	956,117	44.7
2012	2,732,060	83.9	814,110	48.2
2013	2,950,611	84.2	NA	NA
2014	2,637,722	88.2	NA	NA
2015	1,997,757	85.4	NA	NA
2016	1,770,668	84.0	NA	NA
2017	2,130,178	81.9	NA	NA
Total 2003–17	28,773,388	70.3	2,291,072	31.8
Sources: Cars and light trucks: ANFAVEA (2003–2017). Motorcycles: ABRACICLO 2009, 2010, 2011, and 2012. Notes: (1) Includes exports. (2) Total includes gasoline, neat ethanol, flex, and diesel-powered vehicles.

Flexible-fuel technology started being developed by Brazilian engineers near the end of the 1990s. The Brazilian flexible fuel car is built with an ethanol-ready engine and one fuel tank for both fuels. The small gasoline reservoir for starting the engine in cold weather, used in earlier neat ethanol vehicles, was kept to avoid start up problems in the central and southern regions, where winter temperatures normally drop below 15 °C (59 °F). An improved flex motor generation was launched in 2009 and allowed to eliminate the need for this secondary gas reservoir tank. Another improvement was the reduction of fuel consumption and tailpipe emissions, between 10% and 15% as compared to flex motors sold in 2008. In March 2009 Volkswagen do Brasil launched the Polo E-Flex, the first flex fuel model without an auxiliary tank for cold start.

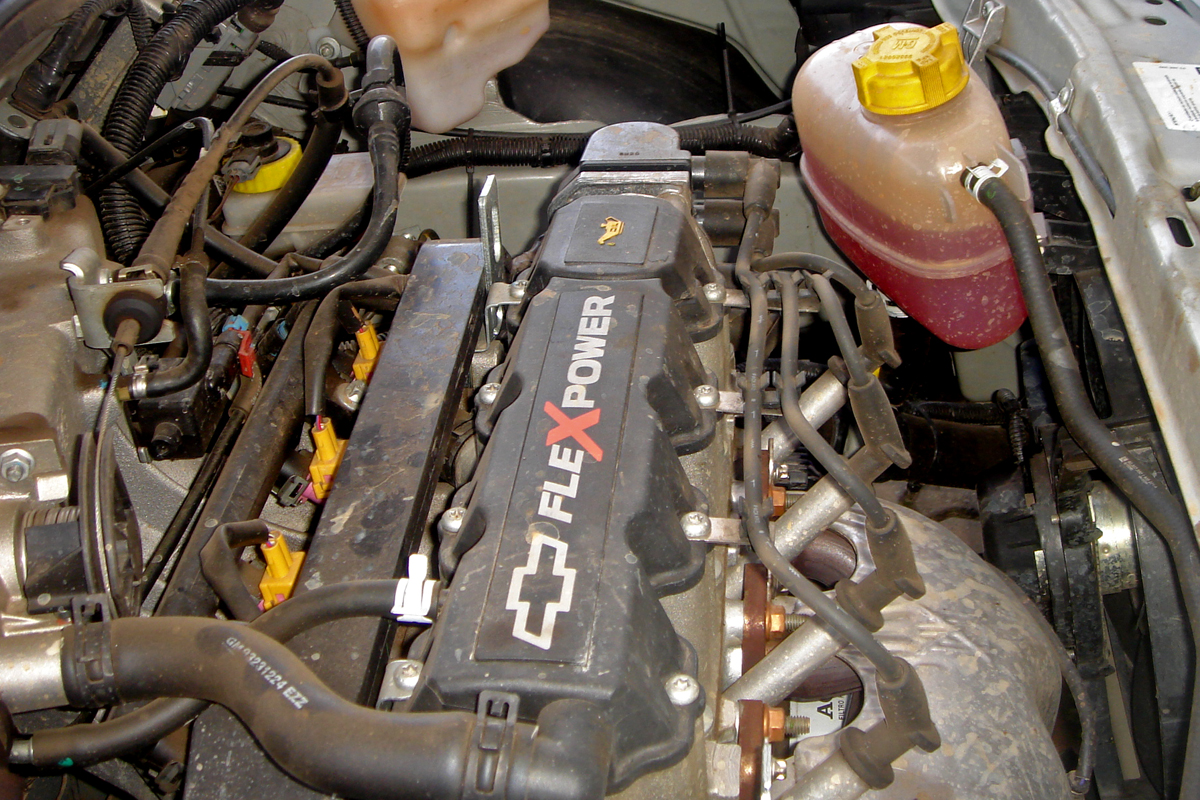
Typical Brazilian flexible-fuel engine with secondary gasoline reservoir for cold starting the engine at temperatures below 15 °C (59 °F)

A key innovation in the Brazilian flex technology was avoiding the need for an additional dedicated sensor to monitor the ethanol-gasoline mix, which made the first American M85 flex fuel vehicles too expensive.

Brazilian flex cars are capable of running on just hydrated ethanol (E100), or just on a blend of gasoline with 25 to 27% anhydrous ethanol (the mandatory blend), or on any arbitrary combination of both fuels.

The flexibility of Brazilian FFVs empowers the consumers to choose the fuel depending on current market prices. As ethanol fuel economy is lower than gasoline because of ethanol's energy content is close to 34% less per unit volume than gasoline, flex cars running on ethanol get a lower mileage than when running on pure gasoline. However, this effect is partially offset by the usually lower price per liter of ethanol fuel. As a rule of thumb, Brazilian consumers are frequently advised by the media to use more alcohol than gasoline in their mix only when ethanol prices are 30% lower or more than gasoline, as ethanol price fluctuates heavily depending on the result of seasonal sugar cane harvests.

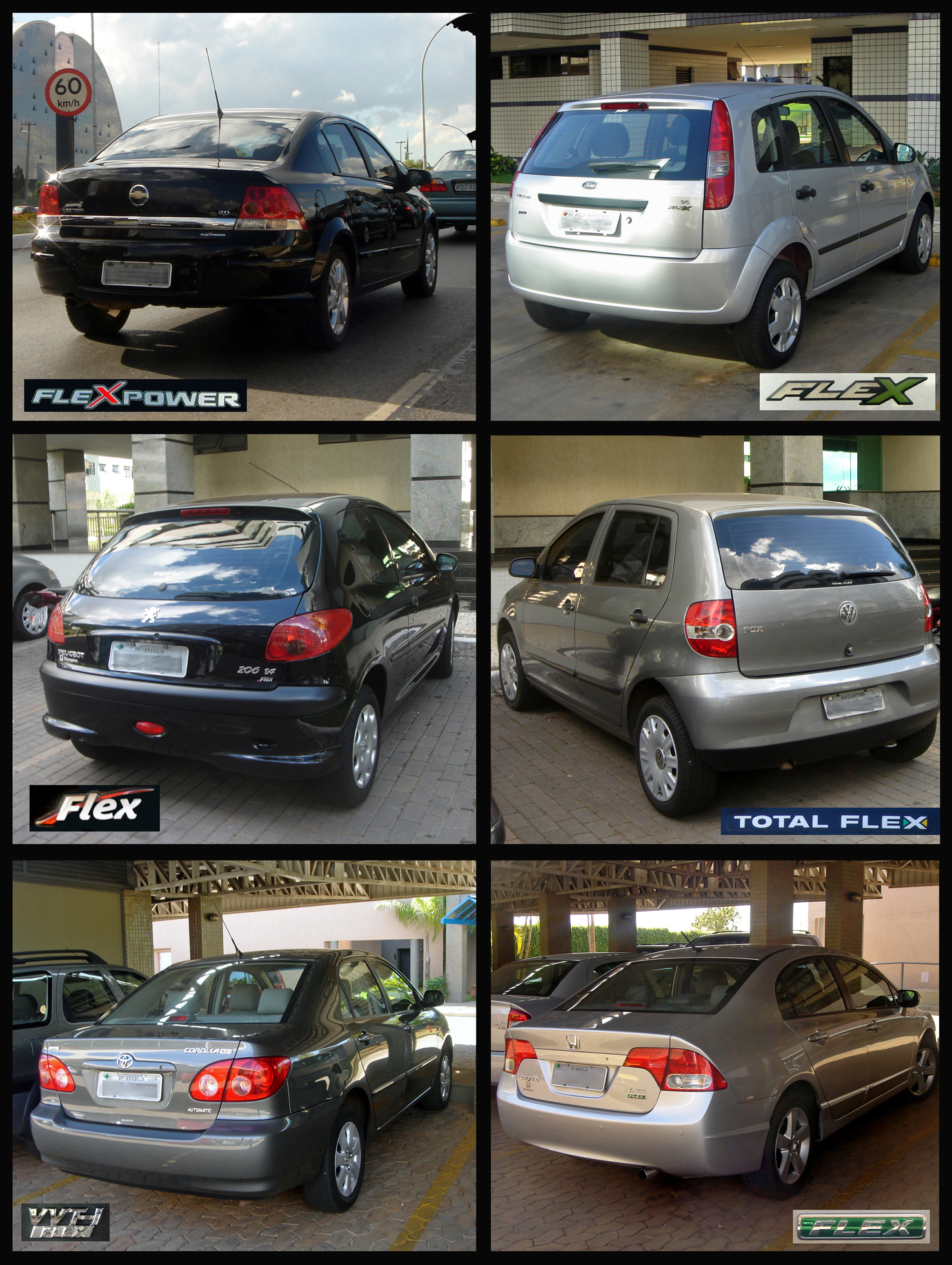
Six typical flex-fuel models from several Brazilian carmakers, popularly known as "flex" cars, that run on any blend of hydrous ethanol (E100) and E20-E25 gasoline

In March 2003 Volkswagen do Brasil launched in the market the Gol 1.6 Total Flex, the first commercial flexible fuel vehicle capable of running on any blend of gasoline and ethanol. GM do Brasil followed three months later with the Chevrolet Corsa 1.8 Flexpower, using an engine developed by a joint-venture with Fiat called PowerTrain. Passenger flex-fuel vehicles became a commercial success in the country, and as of December 2013, a total of 15 car manufacturers produce flex-fuel engines for the Brazilian market, dominating all light vehicle segments except sports cars, off-road vehicles and minivans.

The production of flex-fuel cars and light commercial vehicles since 2003 reached the milestone of 10 million vehicles in March 2010. At the end of 2012 registrations of flex-fuel cars and light trucks represented 87% of all passenger and light duty vehicles sold in the country in 2012, and climbed to a 94% market share of all new passenger vehicles sales in 2013. Production passed the 20 million-unit mark in June 2013.

By the end of 2014, flex-fuel cars represented 54% of the Brazilian registered stock of light-duty vehicles, while gasoline only vehicles represented 34.3%. As of June 2015, flex-fuel light-duty vehicle sales totaled 25.5 million units. The market share of flex vehicles reached 88.6% of all light-duty registrations in 2017. As of March 2018, fifteen years after the launch of the first flex fuel car, there were 30.5 million flex cars and light trucks registered in the country, and 6 million flex motorcycles.

The rapid success of flex vehicles was made possible by the existence of 33,000 filling stations with at least one ethanol pump available by 2006, a heritage of the early Pró-Álcool ethanol program. These facts, together with the mandatory use of E25 blend of gasoline throughout the country, allowed Brazil in 2008 to achieve more than 50% of fuel consumption in the gasoline market from sugar cane-based ethanol.

According to two separate research studies conducted in 2009, at the national level 65% of the flex-fuel registered vehicles regularly used ethanol fuel, and the usage climbed to 93% in São Paulo, the main ethanol producer state where local taxes are lower, and prices at the pump are more competitive than gasoline. However, as a result of higher ethanol prices caused by the Brazilian ethanol industry crisis that began in 2009, combined with government subsidies to keep gasoline price lower than the international market value, by November 2013 only 23% flex-fuel car owners were using ethanol, down from 66% in 2009.

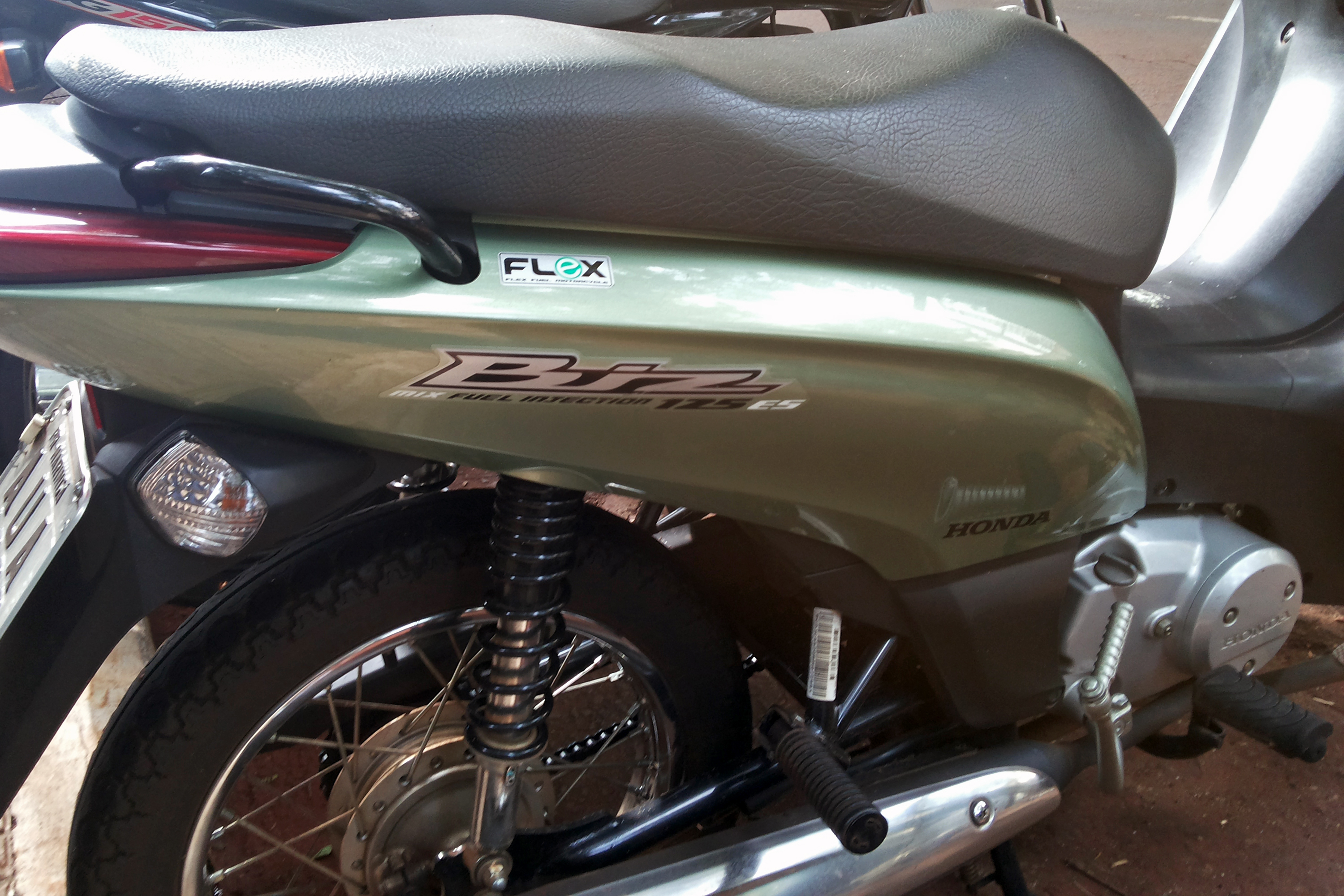
The Honda Biz 125 flex is one of the five flex-fuel motorcycles available in Brazil.

One of the latest innovation within the Brazilian flexible-fuel technology is the development of flex-fuel motorcycles. The first flex-fuel motorcycle was launched by Honda in March 2009, the CG 150 Titan Mix. In September 2009, Honda launched a second flexible-fuel motorcycle, the on-off-road NXR 150 Bros Mix. By December 2012 the five available models of flexible-fuel motorcycles from Honda and Yamaha reached a cumulative production of 2,291,072 units, representing 31.8% of all motorcycles manufactured in Brazil since 2009, and 48.2% of motorcycle production in 2012. Flexible-fuel motorcycle production passed the 3 million-unit milestone in October 2013. The 4 million mark was reached in March 2015.

=== Europe ===
==== Sweden ====
Flexi-fuel sales in Sweden Sales by year (2001–2014)
Year	Sales	Year	Sales
2001	717	2008	57,628
2002	1,926	2009	39,848
2003	1,669	2010	35,256
2004	1,074	2011	15,379
2005	17,232	2012	5,699
2006	25,868	2013	2,914
2007	35,499	2014	2,427
Total 2001–2014		243,136	
Sources: 2001–2010 BioAlcohol Fuel Foundation, and 2011–2014 Bil Sweden.

Flexible-fuel vehicles were introduced in Sweden as a demonstration test in 1994, when three Ford Taurus were imported to show the technology existed. Because of the existing interest, a project was started in 1995 with 50 Ford Taurus E85 flexifuel in different parts of Sweden: Umeå, Örnsköldsvik, Härnösand, Stockholm, Karlstad, Linköping, and Växjö. From 1997 to 1998 an additional 300 Taurus were imported, and the number of E85 fueling grew to 40. Then in 1998 the city of Stockholm placed an order for 2,000 of FFVs for any car manufacturer willing to produce them. The objective was to jump-start the FFV industry in Sweden. The two domestic car makers Volvo Group and Saab AB refused to participate arguing there were not in place any ethanol filling stations. However, Ford Motor Company took the offer and began importing the flexifuel version of its Focus model, delivering the first cars in 2001, and selling more than 15,000 FFV Focus by 2005, then representing an 80% market share of the flexifuel market.

In 2005 both Volvo and Saab introduced to the Sweden market their flexifuel models. Saab began selling its 9-5 2.0 Biopower, joined in 2006 by its 9-5 2.3 Biopower. Volvo introduced its S40 and V50 with flexible-fuel engines, joined in late 2006 by the new C30. All Volvo models were initially restricted to the Sweden market, until 2007, when these three models were launched in eight new European markets. In 2007, Saab also started selling a BioPower version of its popular Saab 9-3 line. In 2008 the Saab-derived Cadillac BLS was introduced with E85 compatible engines, and Volvo launched the V70 with a 2.5-litre turbocharged Flexifuel engine.

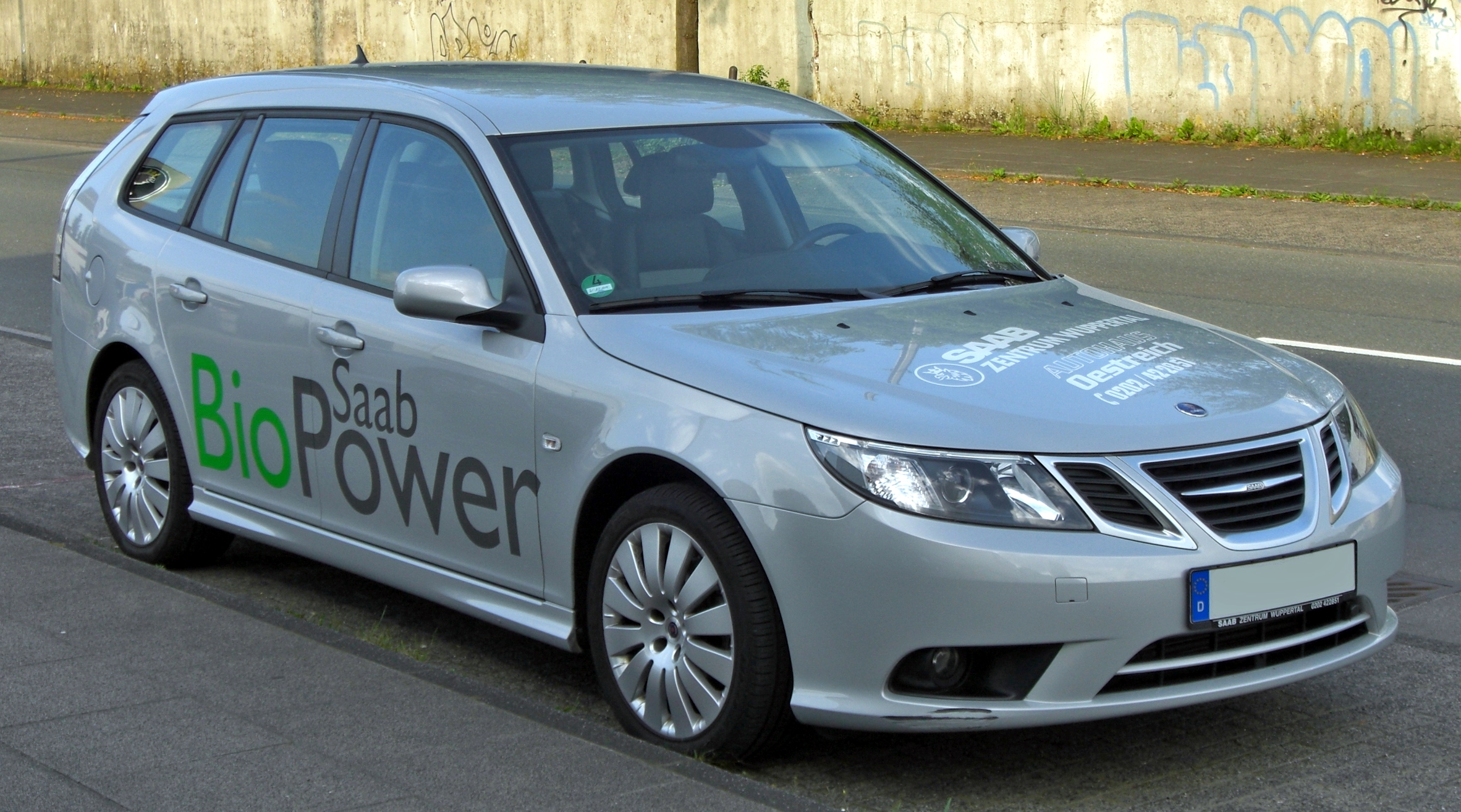
Saab 9-3 SportCombi BioPower. The second E85 model introduced by Saab in the Swedish market in 2007.

All flexible-fuel vehicles in Sweden use an E75 winter blend instead of E85 to avoid engine starting problems during cold weather. This blend was introduced since the winter 2006–07 and E75 is used from November until March. For temperature below −15 °C (5 °F) E85 flex vehicles require an engine block heater. The use of this device is also recommended for gasoline vehicles when temperatures drop below −23 °C (−9 °F). Another option when extreme cold weather is expected is to add more pure gasoline in the tank, thus reducing the ethanol content below the E75 winter blend, or simply not to use E85 during extreme low temperature spells.

Sweden has achieved the largest E85 flexible-fuel vehicle fleet in Europe, with a sharp growth from 717 vehicles in 2001 to 243,136 through December 2014. As of 2008 a total of 70% of all flexifuel vehicles operating in the EU were registered in Sweden. The recent and accelerated growth of the Swedish fleet of E85 flexifuel vehicles is the result of the National Climate Policy in Global Cooperation Bill passed in 2005, which not only ratified the Kyoto Protocol but also sought to meet the 2003 EU Biofuels Directive regarding targets for use of biofuels, and also let to the 2006 government's commitment to eliminate oil imports by 2020.

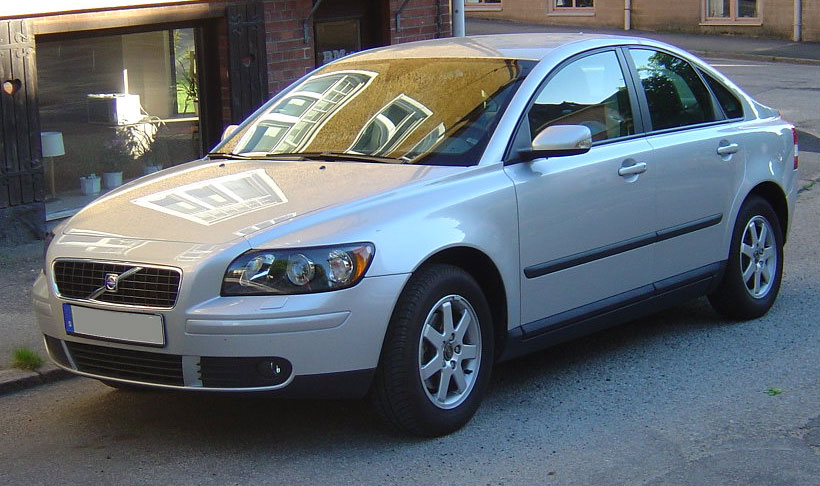
The 2005 Volvo FlexiFuel S40 was one of the first E85 flexible fuel cars available in the country produced by a Swedish automaker. The Volvo FlexiFuel is now offered on the European market.

In order to achieve these goals several government incentives were implemented. Ethanol, as the other biofuels, was exempted of both, the CO_{2} and energy taxes until 2009, resulting in a 30% price reduction at the pump of E85 fuel over gasoline. Furthermore, other demand side incentives for flexifuel vehicle owners include a US$1,800 bonus to buyers of FFVs, exemption from the Stockholm congestion tax, up to 20% discount on auto insurance, free parking spaces in most of the largest cities, owner annual registration taxes, and a 20% tax reduction for flexifuel company cars. Also, a part of the program, the Swedish Government ruled that 25% of their vehicle purchases (excluding police, fire and ambulance vehicles) must be alternative fuel vehicles. By the first months of 2008, this package of incentives resulted in sales of flexible-fuel cars representing 25% of new car sales.

On the supply side, since 2005 the gasoline fuelling stations selling more than 3 million liters of fuel a year are required to sell at least one type of biofuel, resulting in more than 1,200 gas stations selling E85 by August 2008. Despite all the sharp growth of E85 flexifuel cars, by 2007 they represented just two percent of the four million Swedish vehicles. In addition, this law also mandated all new filling stations to offer alternative fuels, and stations with an annual volume of more than one million liters are required to have an alternative fuel pump by December 2009. Therefore, the number of E85 pumps is expected to reach by 2009 nearly 60% of Sweden's 4,000 filling stations.

The Swedish-made Koenigsegg Jesko 300, the low downforce version of the Koenigsegg Jesko, is currently the fastest and most powerful flexible fuel vehicle with its turbocharged V8 producing over 1600 hp when running on biofuel, as compared to 1280 hp on 95 octane unleaded gasoline.

==== Other European countries ====
Bioethanol E85 stations European Union, UK and Norway
Country	Number Stations	As of (date)	Stat/10^{6} persons
Sweden	1,723	2011	184.3
Hungary	426	2011	42.7
Germany	353	2011	4.3
France	304	2011	4.6
Czech Republic	169	2011	16.1
Finland	148	2020	?
Switzerland	62	2011	7.9
Netherlands	48	2011	2.9
Ireland	34	2011	5.5
Austria	29	2011	3.5
United Kingdom	21	2011	0.34
Norway	19	2011	2.30
Spain	19	2011	0.18
Note: Only countries with ten or more E85 stations are included. For other countries search here

Flexifuel vehicles are sold in 18 European countries, including Austria, Belgium, Czech Republic, Denmark, Estonia, Finland, France, Germany, Hungary, Ireland, Italy, the Netherlands, Norway, Poland, Spain, Sweden, Switzerland, and the United Kingdom. Ford, Volvo and Saab are the main automakers offering flexifuel autos in the region.

===== France =====
Biofuel cars in general get strong tax incentives in France, including a 0 or 50% reduction on the tax on new vehicles, and a 40% reduction on CO_{2} tax for new cars. For company cars there is a corporate car tax free for two years and a recovery of 80% of the value added tax (VAT) on E85 vehicles. Also, E85 fuel price is set significantly lower than diesel or gasoline, resulting in E85 at € 0.80, diesel at €1.15, and gasoline at €1.30 per liter, as of April 2007. By May 2008, France had 211 pumps selling E85, even though the government made plans for the installation of up to 500 E85 pumps by year end 2007. French automakers Renault and PSA (Citroen & Peugeot) announced they will start selling FFV cars beginning in the summer 2007.

===== Germany =====
Biofuel emphasis in Germany is on biodiesel, and no specific incentives have been granted for E85 flex-fuel cars; however, there is complete exemption of taxes on all biofuels while there is a normal tax of €0.65 per liter of petroleum fuels. The distribution of E85 began in 2005, and with 219 stations as of September 2008, Germany ranks second after Sweden with the most E85 fueling stations in the EU. As of July 2012 retail prices of E85 was €1.09 per liter, and gasoline was priced at €1.60 per liter (for gasoline RON 95), then providing enough margin to compensate for ethanol's lower fuel economy. Ford has offered the Ford Focus since August 2005 in Germany. Ford is about to offer also the Mondeo and other models as FFV versions between 2008 and 2010. The Saab 9-5 and Saab 9-3 Biopower, the Peugeot 308 Bioflex, the Citroën C4 Bioflex, the Audi A5, two models of the Cadillac BLS, and five Volvo models are also available in the German market by 2008. Since 2011, Dacia offers the Logan MCV with a 1.6l 16v flexfuel engine.

===== Ireland =====
Ireland is the third best seller European market of E85 flex-fuel vehicles, after Sweden and France. Bioethanol (E85) in Ireland is made from whey, a waste product of cheese manufacturing. The Irish government established several incentives, including a 50% discount in vehicle registration taxes (VRT), which can account for more than one third of the retail price of a new car in Ireland (around €6,500). The bioethanol element of the E85 fuel is excise-free for fuel companies, allowing retail prices to be low enough to offset the 25 per cent cut in fuel economy that E-85 cars offer, due to ethanol's lower energy content than gasoline. Also, the value added tax (VAT) on the fuel can also be claimed back. E-85 fuel is available across the country in more than 20 of Maxol service stations. In October 2005, the 1.8 Ford Focus FFV became the first flexible-fuel vehicle to be commercially sold in Ireland. Later Ford launched the C-max and the Mondeo flexifuel models. Saab and Volvo also have E85 models available.

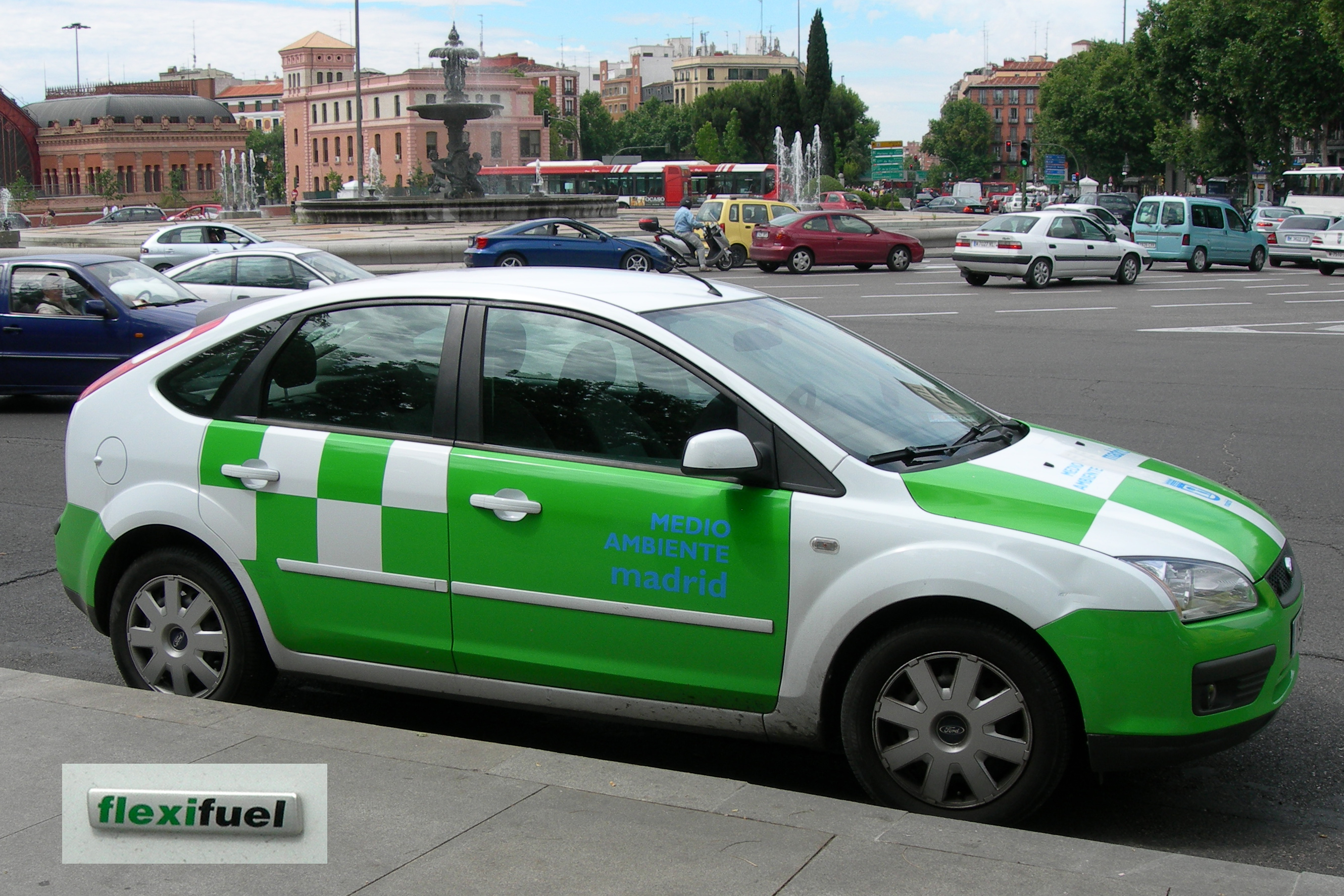
The Ford Focus flexifuel was the first E85 flexible fuel vehicle commercially available in the European market.

From 1 January 2011 E85 fuel is no longer excise-free in Ireland. Maxol has announced they will not provide E85 when their current supplies have run out.

===== Spain =====
The first flexifuel vehicles were introduced in Spain by late 2007, with the acquisition of 80 cars for use in the Spaniard official government fleet. At that time the country had only three gas stations selling E85, making necessary to deploy an official E85 fueling station in Madrid to attend these vehicles. Despite the introduction in the Spaniard market of several flexifuel models, by the end of 2008 still persists the problems of adequate E85 fueling infrastructure, as only 10 gas stations were selling E85 fuel to the public in the entire country.

===== United Kingdom =====
The UK government established several incentives for E85 flex-fuel vehicles. These include a fuel duty rebate on E85 fuel of 20 p per liter, until 2010; a £10 to 15 reduction in the vehicle excise duty (VED); and a 2% annual company car tax discount for flex-fuel cars. Despite the small number of E85 pump stations available, limited to the Morrisons supermarket chain stations, most automakers offer the same models in the UK that are available in the European market. In 2005 the Ford Focus Flexi-Fuel became the first flexible-fuel car sold in the UK, though E85 pumps were not opened until 2006. Volvo now offers its flexifuel models S80, S40, C30, V50 and V70. Other models available in the UK are the Ford C-Max Flexi-Fuel, and the Saab models 9-5 and 9-3 Flex-Fuel Biopower, and the new Saab Aero X BioPower E100 bioethanol. Despite being introduced around a decade ago, E85 is no longer commercially available in the UK

=== United States ===
E85 FFVs Manufactured and in Use in the United States 1998–2018
Year	Light-Duty E85 FFVs sold/leased	Light-Duty E85 FFVs net annual increase*	Total fleet E85 FFVs in use
1998	216,165	144,000	144,000
1999	426,724	306,149	450,148
2000	600,832	456,947	907,096
2001	581,774	466,203	1,373,299
2002	834,976	700,719	2,074,018
2003	859,261	750,437	2,824,455
2004	674,678	609,437	3,433,892
2005	743,948	683,217	4,117,109
2006	1,011,399	960,287	5,077,396
2007	1,115,069	1,076,902	6,154,298
2008	1,175,345	1,149,389	7,303,687
2009	805,777	n.a.	
2010	1,484,945	n.a.	
2011	2,116,273	n.a.	
2012	2,466,966	n.a.	
2013	2,665,470	n.a.	
2014	2,433,113	n.a.	
2015	1,881,500	n.a.	
2016	1,272,091	n.a.	
2017	1,150,097	n.a.	
2018	813,774	n.a.	
Total	21,790,445	n.a.	
Note: * Net increase is new FFVs manufactured discounted by the survival rate. Source: National Renewable Energy Laboratory

As of 2017, there were more than 21 million E85 flex-fuel vehicles in the United States, up from about 11 million flex-fuel cars and light trucks in operation as of early 2013. The number of flex-fuel vehicles on U.S. roads increased from 1.4 million in 2001, to 4.1 million in 2005, and rose to 7.3 million in 2008.

For the 2011 model year there are about 70 vehicles E85 capable, including sedans, vans, SUVs and pick-up trucks. Many of the models available in the market are trucks and sport-utility vehicles getting less than 20 mpg_{‑US} (12 L/100 km; 24 mpg_{‑imp}) when filled with gasoline. Actual consumption of E85 among flex-fuel vehicle owners is limited. Nevertheless, the U.S. Department of Energy estimated that in 2011 only 862,837 flex-fuel fleet-operated vehicles were regularly fueled with E85. As a result, from all the ethanol fuel consumed in the country in 2009, only 1% was E85 consumed by flex-fuel vehicles.

The E85 blend is used in gasoline engines modified to accept such higher concentrations of ethanol, and the fuel injection is regulated through a dedicated sensor, which automatically detects the amount of ethanol in the fuel, allowing to adjust both fuel injection and spark timing accordingly to the actual blend available in the vehicle's tank. Because ethanol contains close to 34% less energy per unit volume than gasoline, E85 FFVs have a lower mileage per gallon than gasoline. Based on EPA tests for all 2006 E85 models, the average fuel economy for E85 vehicles was 25.56% lower than unleaded gasoline.

The American E85 flex-fuel vehicle was developed to run on any mixture of unleaded gasoline and ethanol, anywhere from 0% to 85% ethanol by volume. Both fuels are mixed in the same tank, and E85 is sold already blended. In order to reduce ethanol evaporative emissions and to avoid problems starting the engine during cold weather, the maximum blend of ethanol was set to 85%. There is also a seasonal reduction of the ethanol content to E70 (called winter E85 blend) in very cold regions, where temperatures fall below 0 °C (32 °F) during the winter. In Wyoming for example, E70 is sold as E85 from October to May.

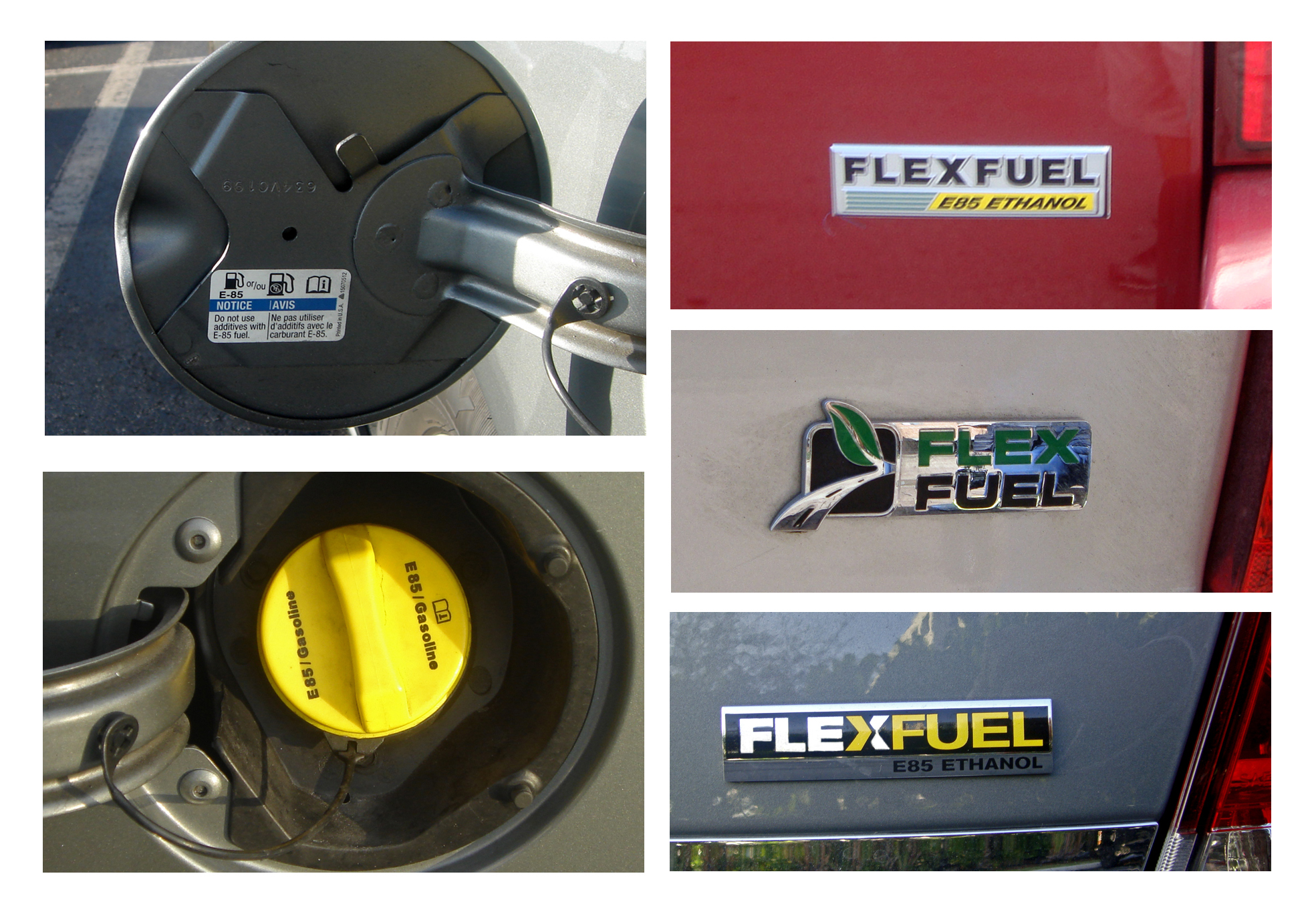
Typical labeling used in the US to identify E85 flex-fuel vehicles. Top left: a small sticker in the back of the fuel filler door. Bottom left: the bright yellow gas cap now used in newer models. E85 Flexfuel badging used in newer models from Chrysler (top right), Ford (middle right) and GM (bottom right).

E85 flex-fuel vehicles are becoming increasingly common in the Midwest, where corn is a major crop and is the primary feedstock for ethanol fuel production. Regional retail E85 prices vary widely across the US, with more favorable prices in the Midwest region, where most corn is grown and ethanol produced. Depending on the vehicle capabilities, the break-even price of E85 has to be between 25 and 30% lower than gasoline.

==== Barriers to widespread adoption ====
A 2005 survey found that 68% of American flex-fuel car owners were not aware they owned an E85 flex. This was because the exteriors of flex and non-flex vehicles look exactly the same; there is no sale price difference between them; the lack of consumers' awareness about E85s; and also the initial decision of American automakers of not putting any kind of exterior labeling, so buyers could be unaware they are purchasing an E85 vehicle. Since 2008, all new FFV models in the US feature a bright yellow gas cap to remind drivers of the E85 capabilities and proper flex-fuel badging.

Some critics have argued that American automakers have been producing E85 flex models motivated by a loophole in the Corporate Average Fuel Economy (CAFE) requirements, that allows for a fuel economy credit for every flex-fuel vehicle sold, whether or not in practice these vehicles are fueled with E85. This loophole might allow the car industry to meet the CAFE targets in fuel economy just by spending between US$100 and US$200 that it cost to turn a conventional vehicle into a flex-fuel, without investing in new technology to improve fuel economy, and saving them the potential fines for not achieving that standard in a given model year. The CAFE standards proposed in 2011 for the period 2017–2025 will allow flexible-fuel vehicles to receive extra credit but only when the carmakers present data proving how much E85 such vehicles have actually consumed.

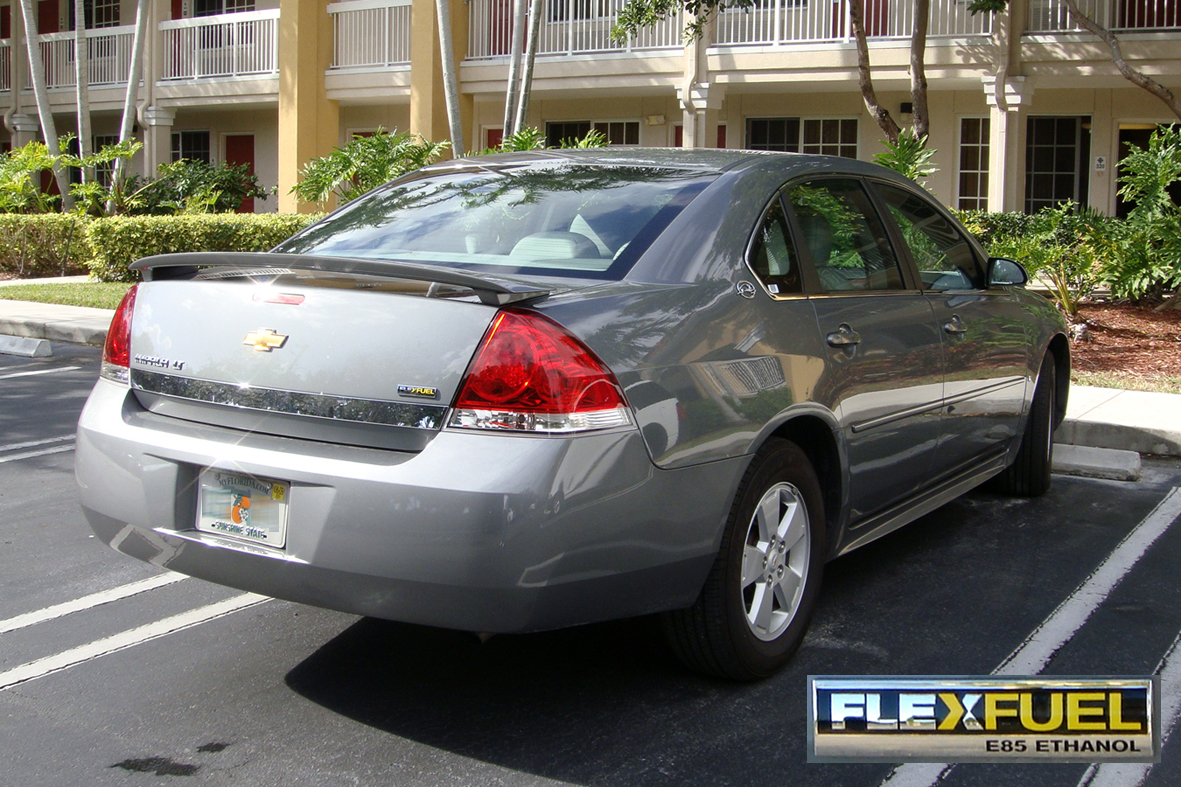
2009 E85 FlexFuel Chevrolet Impala LT

A major restriction hampering sales of E85 flex vehicles, or fueling with E85, is the limited infrastructure available to sell E85 to the public with only 2% of the motor fuel stations offering E85 by March 2014. As of November 2015, there were only 3,218 fueling stations selling E85 to the public in the entire U.S., while about 156,000 retail motor fuel outlets do not offer any ethanol blend. In addition, there has been a great concentration of E85 stations in the Corn Belt states. The main constraint for a more rapid expansion of E85 availability is that it requires dedicated storage tanks at filling stations, at an estimated cost of US$60,000 for each dedicated ethanol tank. The Obama Administration set the goal of installing 10,000 blender pumps nationwide until 2015, and to support this target the US Department of Agriculture (USDA) issued a rule in May 2011 to include flexible fuel pumps in the Rural Energy for America Program (REAP). This ruling will provide financial assistance to fuel station owners to install E85 and blender pumps.

==== Flex fuel conversion kit ====
A flex fuel conversion kit is a kit that allows a conventional equipment manufactured vehicle to be altered to operate on propane, natural gas, methane gas, ethanol, or electricity are classified as aftermarket AFV conversions. All vehicle conversions, except those that are completed for a vehicle to run on electricity, must meet current applicable U.S. Environmental Protection Agency (EPA) standards.

==== Latest developments ====
In 2008, Ford delivered the first flex-fuel plug-in hybrid as part of a demonstration project, a Ford Escape Plug-in Hybrid capable of running on E85 or gasoline. General Motors announced that the new Chevrolet Volt plug-in hybrid, launched in the United States market in December 2010, would be flex-fuel-capable in 2013. General Motors do Brasil announced that it will import from five to ten Volts to Brazil during the first semester of 2011 as part of a demonstration and also to lobby the federal government to enact financial incentives for green cars. If successful, GM would adapt the Volt to operate on ethanol fuel, as most new cars sold in Brazil are flex-fuel.

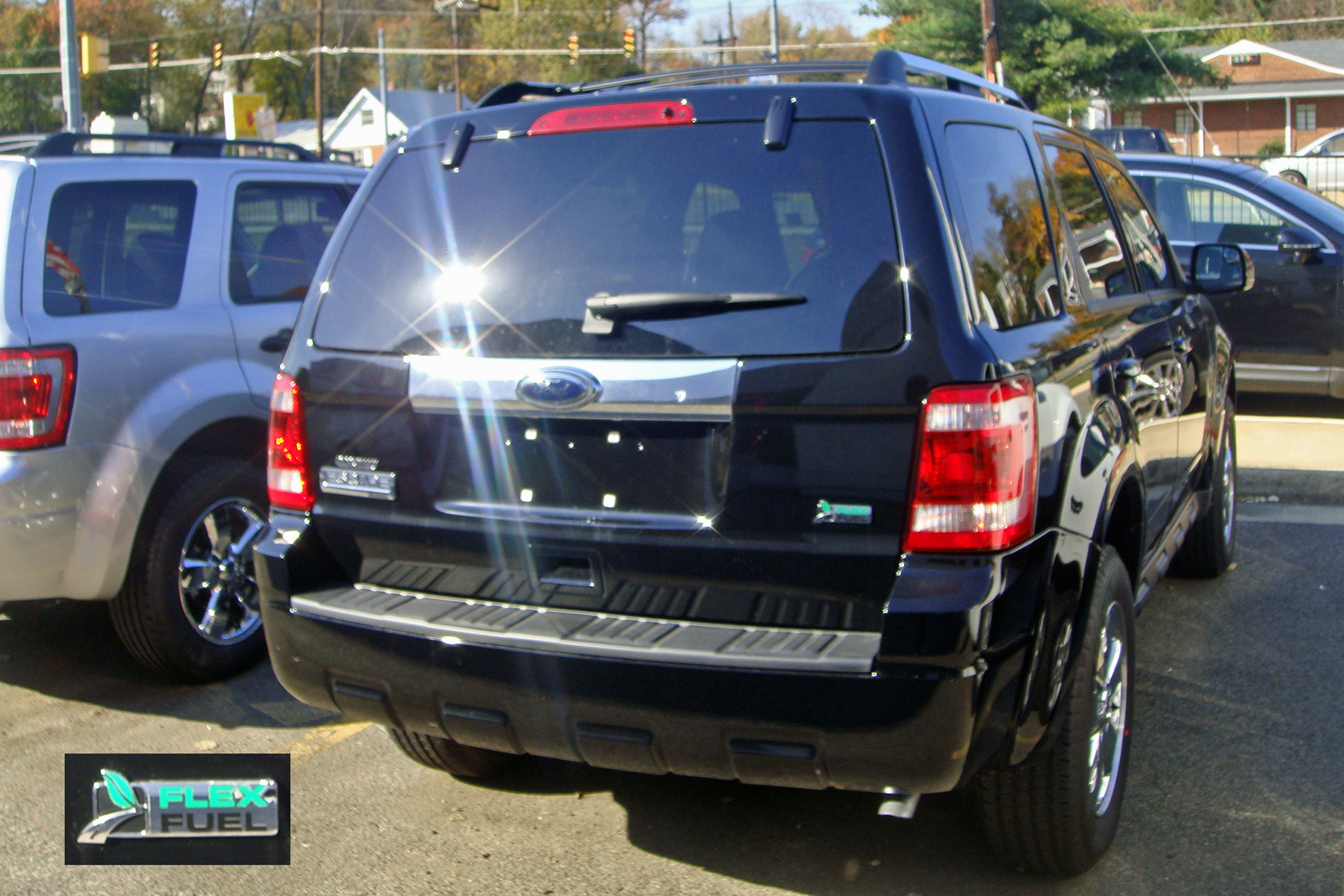
2010 E85 Flexfuel Ford Escape

In 2008, Chrysler, General Motors, and Ford pledged to manufacture 50 percent of their entire vehicle line as flexible fuel in model year 2012, if enough fueling infrastructure develops. The Open Fuel Standard Act (OFS), introduced to Congress in May 2011, is intended to promote a massive adoption of flex-fuel vehicles capable of running on ethanol or methanol. The bill requires that 50 percent of automobiles made in 2014, 80 percent in 2016, and 95 percent in 2017, would be manufactured and warranted to operate on non-petroleum-based fuels, which includes existing technologies such as flex-fuel, natural gas, hydrogen, biodiesel, plug-in electric and fuel cell.

As of December 2014, almost half of new vehicles produced by Chrysler, Ford, and General Motors are flex-fuel, meaning roughly one-quarter of all new vehicles sold by 2015 are capable of using up to E85. However, obstacles to widespread use of E85 fuel remain. A 2014 analysis by the Renewable Fuels Association (RFA) found that oil companies prevent or discourage affiliated retailers from selling E85 through rigid franchise and branding agreements, restrictive supply contracts, and other tactics. The report showed independent retailers are five times more likely to offer E85 than retailers carrying an oil company brand.

=== Other countries ===
==== Australia ====
In January 2007 GM brought UK-sourced Saab 9-5 Biopower E85 flex-fuel vehicles to Australia as a trial, in order to measure interest in ethanol-powered vehicles in the country. Saab Australia placed the vehicles with the fleets of the Queensland Government, the media, and some ethanol producers. E85 is not available widely in Australia, but the Manildra Group provided the E85 blend fuel for this trial.

Saab Australia became the first car maker to produce an E85 flex-fuel car for the Australian market with the Saab 9-5 BioPower. One month later launched the new 9-3 BioPower, the first vehicle in Australia to give drivers a choice of three fuels, E85, diesel or gasoline, and both automobiles are sold for a small premium. Australia's largest independent fuel retailer, United Petroleum, announced plans to install Australia's first commercial E85 fuel pumps, one in Sydney and one in Melbourne.

GM Holden, the Victorian state government, Coskata, Caltex, Veolia Environmental Services and Mitsui have announced a consortium with a co-ordinated plan to build a bio-ethanol plant from household waste for use as E85 fuel. In August 2010 Caltex launched the E85 ethanol fuel called Bio E-Flex, designed for use in the Holden Commodore VE Series II flex-fuel vehicles to be released later in 2010. Caltex Australia plans to begin selling Bio E-Flex in Melbourne from September and expects to have Bio E-Flex available in more than 30 service stations in Melbourne, Sydney, Brisbane, Adelaide and Canberra by the end of October, with plans to increase to 100 metropolitan and regional locations in 2011.

==== Canada ====
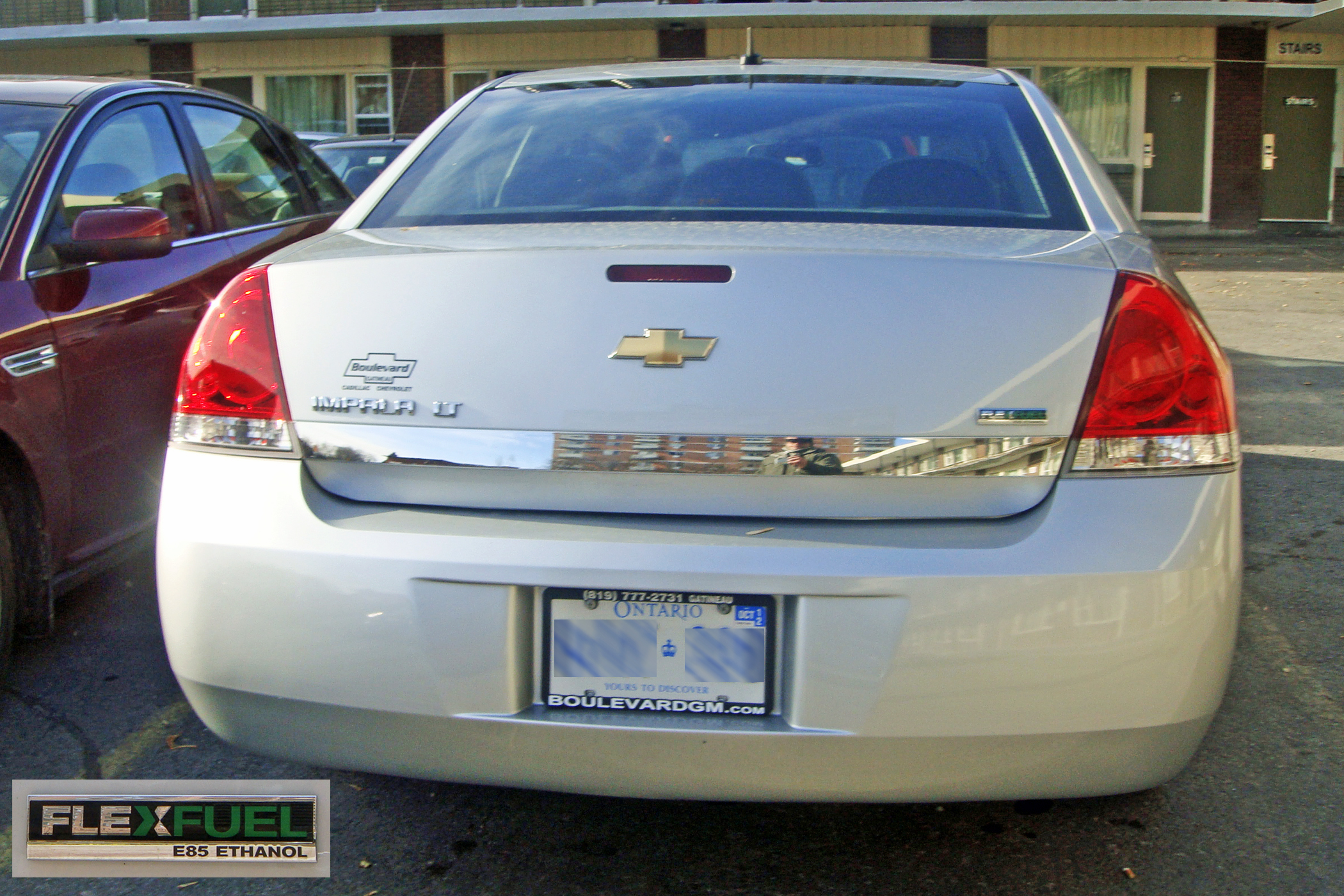
E85 flexible-fuel vehicle in Ottawa

As part of the North American auto market, by 2007 Canada had available 51 models of E85 flex-vehicles, most from Chrysler, Ford and General Motors, including automobiles, pickup trucks, and SUVs. The country had around 1.6 million capable flex fuel E85s on the roads by 2014. However, most users are not aware they own an E85, as vehicles are not clearly labeled as such, and even though the newer models have a yellow cap in the fuel tank informing that the vehicle can handle E85, most users are still not aware because there are very few gas stations offering E85. Another major drawback to greater E85 fuel use is the fact that by June 2008 Canada had only three public E85 pumps, all located in Ontario, in the cities of Guelph, Chatham, and Woodstock. E85 fueling is available primarily for fleet vehicles, including 20 government refueling stations not available for the public. The main feedstocks for E85 production in Canada are corn and wheat, and there were several proposals being discussed to increase the actual use of E85 fuel in FFVs, such as creating an ethanol-friendly highway or ethanol corridor.

==== Colombia ====
In March 2009 the Colombian government enacted a mandate to introduce E85 flexible-fuel cars. The executive decree applies to all gasoline-powered vehicles with engines smaller than 2.0 liters manufactured, imported, and commercialized in the country beginning in 2012, mandating that 60% of such vehicles must have flex-fuel engines capable of running with gasoline or E85, or any blend of both. By 2014 the mandatory quota is 80% and it will reach 100 percent by 2016. All vehicles with engines bigger than 2.0 liters must be E85 capable starting in 2013. The decree also mandates that by 2011 all gasoline stations must provide infrastructure to guarantee availability of E85 throughout the country. The mandatory introduction of E85 flex-fuels has caused controversy among carmakers, car dealers, gasoline station owners, and even some ethanol producers complained the industry is not ready to supply enough ethanol for the new E85 fleet.

==== India ====
Union Minister for Road Transport and Highways Nitin Gadkari has emphasised the adoption of alternative fuels which will be import substitutes, cost-effective, pollution-free, indigenous, and discourage the use of Petrol or diesel. During an event held on 20 October 2021, while addressing the media and journalists he has said that the government will ask all vehicle manufacturers to make flex-fuel engines under the Euro VI emission norms in the next six-eight months. Flex-fuel, or flexible fuel, is an alternative fuel made of a combination of gasoline and methanol or ethanol.

Mr. Gadkari has predicted that in the next 15 years, Indian automobile industry will be worth Rs 15 lakh crore and the Government is planning to submit an affidavit in the Hon'ble Supreme Court of India to allow manufacturing of flex-fuel engines under the Euro IV emission norms but for now he said that the Indian Government will ask all vehicle manufacturers to make flex-fuel engines (that can run on more than one fuel) under the Euro VI emission norms in the next 6–8 months.

==== New Zealand ====
In 2006 New Zealand began a pilot project with two E85 Ford Focus Flexi-Fuel evaluation cars. The main feedstock used in New Zealand for ethanol production is whey, a by-product of milk production.

==== Paraguay ====
Government officials and businessmen from Paraguay began negotiations in 2007 with Brazilian automakers in order to import flex cars that run on any blend of gasoline and ethanol. If successful, Paraguay would become the first destination for Brazilian flex-fuel car exports. In May 2008, the Paraguayan government announced a plan to eliminate import taxes of flex-fuel vehicles and an incentive program for ethanol production. The plan also includes the purchase of 20,000 flex cars in 2009 for the government fleet.

==== Thailand ====
In 2006, tax incentives were established in Thailand for the introduction of compressed natural gas (CNG) as an alternative fuel, by eliminating import duties and lowering excise taxes on CNG-compatible cars. Then in 2007, Thai authorities approved incentives for the production of "eco-cars", with the goal of the country to become a regional hub for the production of small, affordable and fuel-efficient cars. Seven automakers joint in the program, Toyota, Suzuki, Nissan, Mitsubishi, Honda, Tata and Volkswagen. In 2008 the government announced priority for E85, expecting these flex-fuel vehicles to become widely available in Thailand in 2009, three years ahead of schedule. The incentives include cuts in excise tax rates for E85-compatible cars and reduction of corporate taxes for ethanol producers to make sure E85 fuel supply will be met. This new plan however, brought confusion and protests by the automakers which sign-up for the "eco-cars", as competition with the E85 flex-fuel cars will negatively affect their ongoing plans and investments, and their production lines will have to be upgraded at a high cost for them to produce flex-fuel cars. They also complained that flex-fuel vehicles popular in a few countries around the world, limiting their export potential as compared with other engine technologies.

Despite the controversy, the first E85 flexible fuel vehicles were introduced in November 2008. The first two models available in the Thai market were the Volvo S80 and the C30. The S80 is manufactured locally and the C30 is imported. By the time of the introduction of flex vehicles there were already two gas stations with E85 fuel available. During 2009 it was expected that 15 fueling stations in Bangkok will have E85 fuel available. In October 2009 the Mitsubishi Lancer Ex was launched becoming the first mass-production E85 flexi-fuel vehicle produced in Thailand.

=== Comparison among the leading markets ===
Comparison of key characteristics among the leading ethanol flexible-fuel vehicle markets
Characteristic	Brazil	Sweden	U.S.	Units/comments
Type of flexible-fuel vehicle (fuel used)	E20 to E100	E85	E85	Brazil's mandatory blend is E20-E25. Winter E85 is actually E70 in the US and E75 in Sweden.
Main feedstock used for ethanol consumption	Sugar cane	80% imported	Maize	In 2007, most Swedish ethanol was imported, with a high share from Brazil.
Total flex-fuel vehicles produced/sold	36.5 million	229,400	20 million^{(1)}	Brazil as of March 2018, Sweden sales as of September 2013 and U.S. fleet on the road as of December 2016. The Brazilian fleet includes over 6.0 million flex fuel motorcycles. USDOE estimates that in 2009 only 504,297 flex-fuel vehicles were regularly fueled with E85 in the US.
Share of flex-fuel vehicles as % of total registered	22.0%	4.7%	4.0%	Brazil's fleet is 64.8 mi (2010), Sweden fleet is 4.8 mi (2008), and US fleet is 248.5 mi (2009).
Ethanol fueling stations in the country	35,017	1,723	2,757	Brazil for December 2007, the US and Sweden as of August 2011.
Ethanol filling stations as % of total	100%	30%	1.7%	As % of total fueling gas stations in the country.
Ethanol fueling stations per million inhabitants	184.2	130.4	6.5	See List of countries by population. Brazil and US as of 2008-09-12, and Sweden as of 2008-06-30.
Retail price of E85 or E100 (local currency/unit)	R$ 3.060/L	SEK 13.29/L	US$2.42/gal	Selected regions:^{(2)}Brazil, May 2019, Sweden, January 2008, and United States, May 2019
Retail price of gasoline or E25. (local currency/unit)	R$ 4.560/L	SEK 16.85/L	US$3.17/gal	Prices in Brazil (E25), May 2019, Sweden, May 2019, and United States, May 2019.
Price economy ethanol/gasoline price as %	49.0%^{(2)}^{(3)}	26.8%^{(2)}^{(3)}	30.9%^{(2)}^{(3)}	Brazil, May 2019, Sweden, May 2019, and United States, May 2019.
Notes: (1)The effective number of E85 flex vehicles in US roads actually using ethanol fuel is lower than shown, as a survey have shown than 68% of E85 owners are not aware they own a flex-fuel vehicle. A 2007 national survey found that only 5% of drivers actually use biofuels. (2) Regional prices vary widely in Brazil and the US. The states chosen reflect some of the lowest retail prices for ethanol, as both São Paulo and Minnesota are main growers of feedstock and producers of ethanol, hence, the comparison presented is one of the most favorable for ethanol/gasoline price ratios. For example, US average spread was 16.9% in August 2008, and it varied from 35% in Indiana to 3% in Utah. See more US price comparisons for most states at e85prices.com, and annual fuel costs for 2008 FFV US models at www.fueleconomy.gov. (3) Brazilian gasoline is heavily taxed (~54%), US ethanol production was subsidized (a US$0.51/gal federal tax credit) until December 2011, and Swedish E85 is exempt of CO2 and energy taxes until 2009 (~30% price reduction).

== List of currently produced flexible-fuel vehicles ==
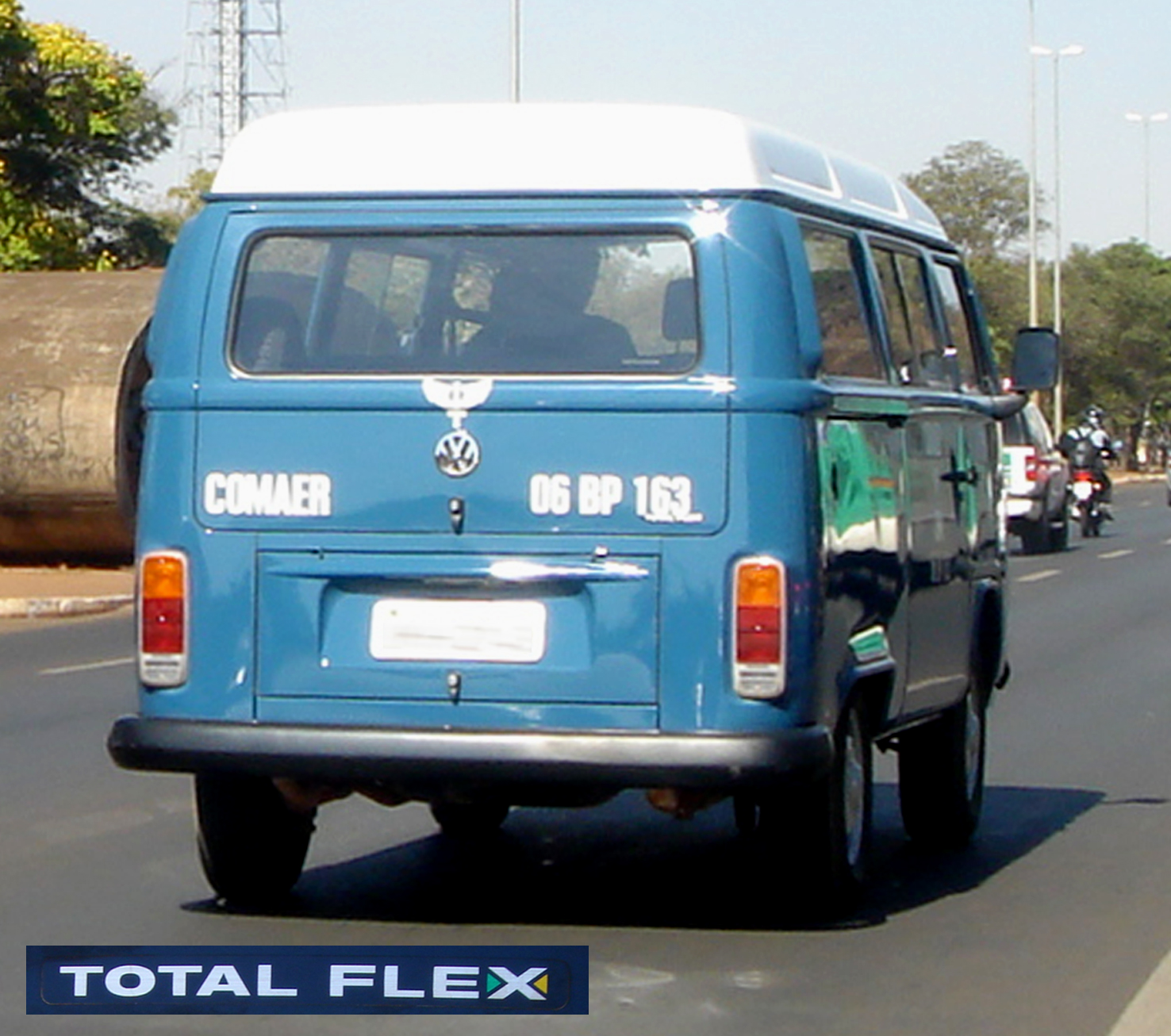
VW Type 2 TotalFlex(Brazilian version, known as "Kombi")

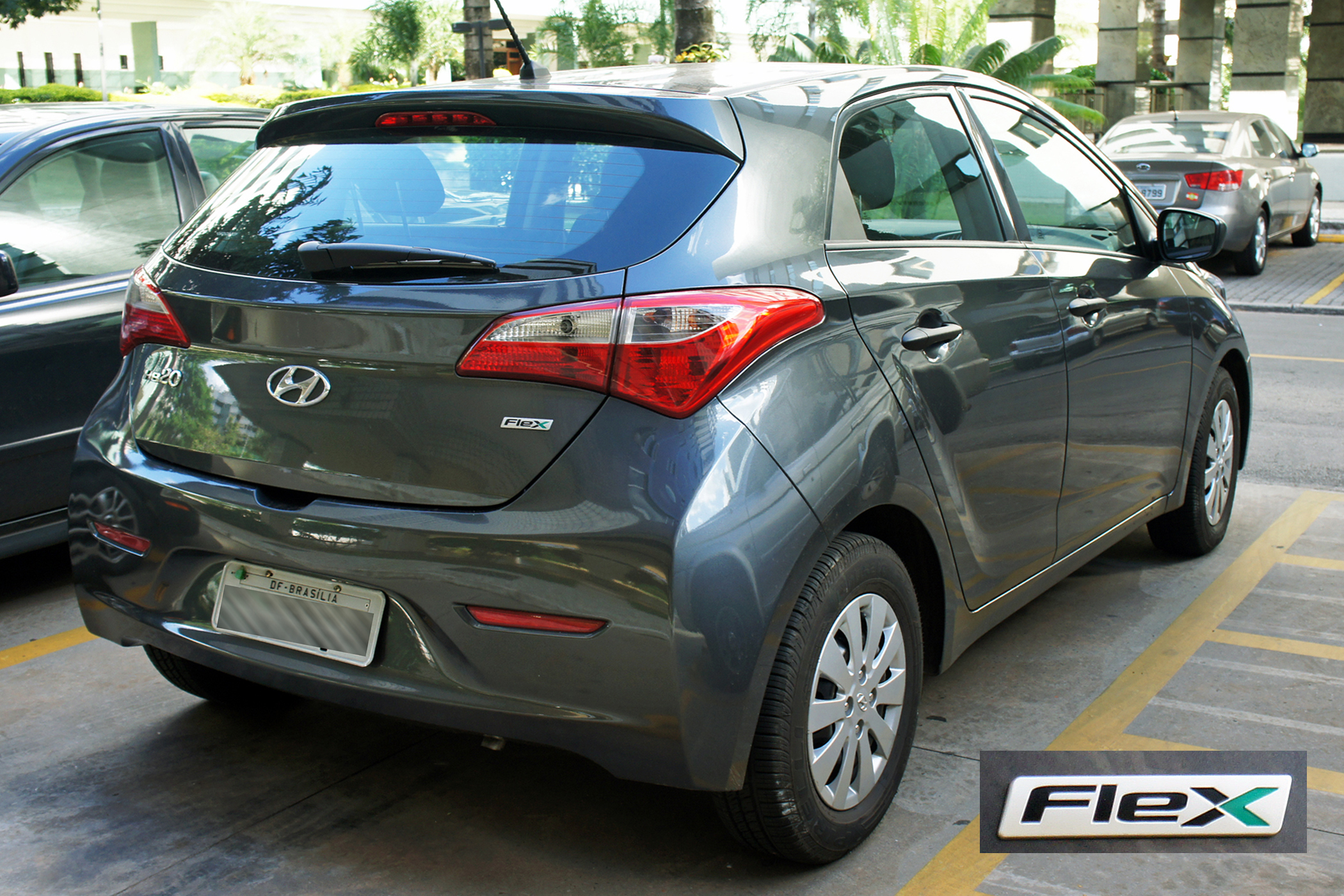
Hyundai HB20 (Brazil)

=== Europe ===
- Citroën C4 1.6 BioFlex
- Dacia Duster, Dacia Logan, Dacia Sandero
- Fiat Aegea 1.6 16V E.torQ
- SEAT León 1.6 MPI MultiFuel
- XC60 (concept)

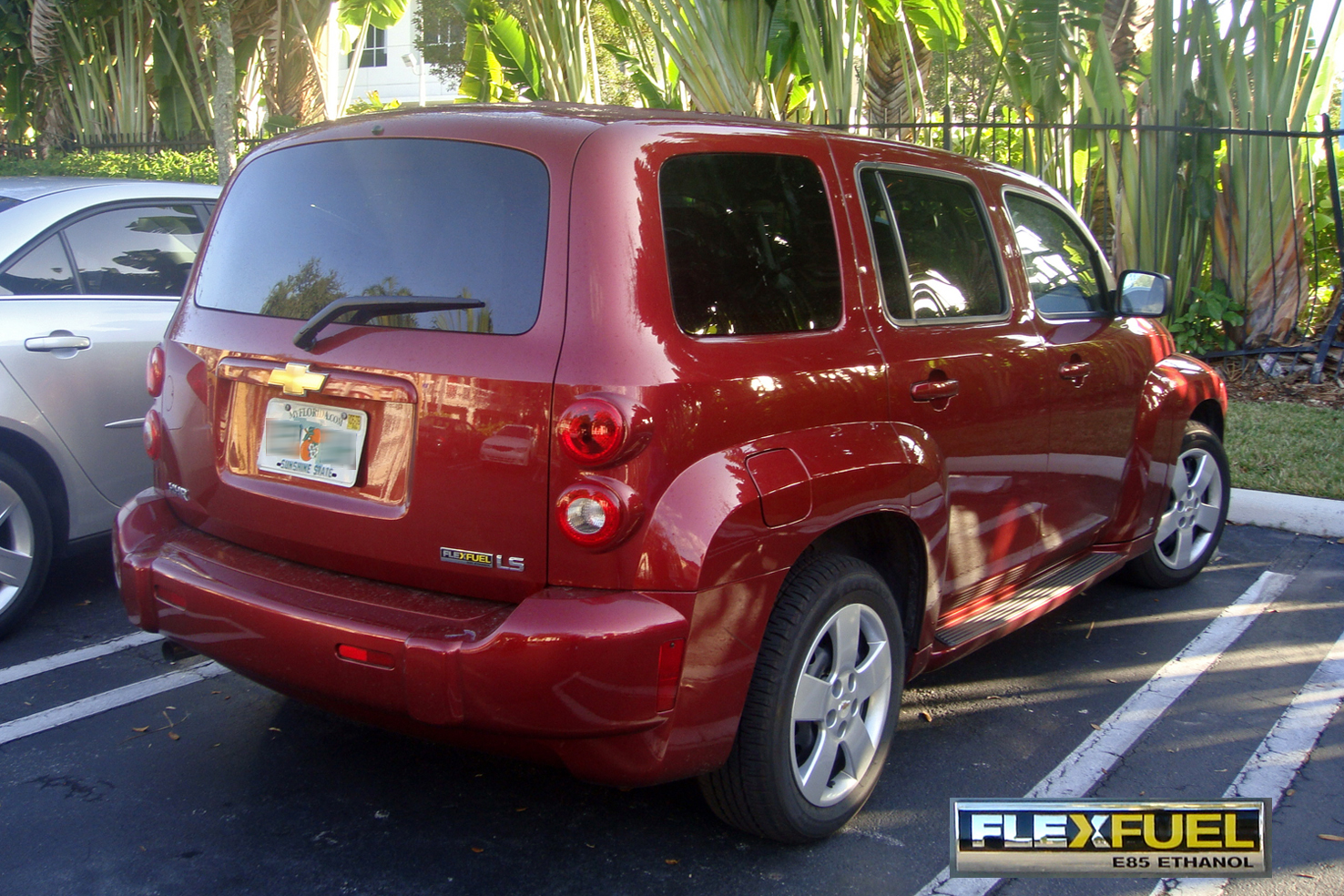
U.S. E85 FlexFuel Chevrolet HHR LS 2009

=== Thailand ===
- Mitsubishi: Lancer Ex 1.8
- Honda: Civic FB, Civic FC, City 6th gen, CR-V 4th gen, CR-V 5th gen, HR-V, Accord 9th gen, Accord 10th gen
- Mazda: Mazda 3 BM / BP, Mazda CX-5 KE / KF, Mazda CX-3, Mazda CX-30
- Toyota: Corolla Altis, C-HR, Camry XV70, Vios, Corolla Cross
- Volvo: S60 DRIVe, S80 2.5FT
- Ford: Focus 1.5 EcoBoost
- Chevrolet: Captiva 2.4 Ecotec E85, Cruze 1.8 Ecotec E85
- MG: 3 VTi-TECH HS TGI
- Mercedes-Benz: GLA 200

== See also ==
- Alternative propulsion
- Battery electric vehicle
- Bivalent (engine)
- Butanol fuel
- Clean Cities
- Common ethanol fuel mixtures
- Ethanol fuel by country
- Food vs fuel
- Natural gas vehicle
- Plug-in hybrid electric vehicle
- Vehicle conversion
