= M85 fuel =

M85 is a fuel blending 85% methanol and 15% petrol. M85 is similar to E85, but cannot be used in vehicles designed for E85. Mass production of enough methanol to produce M85 at scale would require extensive coal mining and burning.
