= Corn production in the United States =

Production of maize crop in the United States

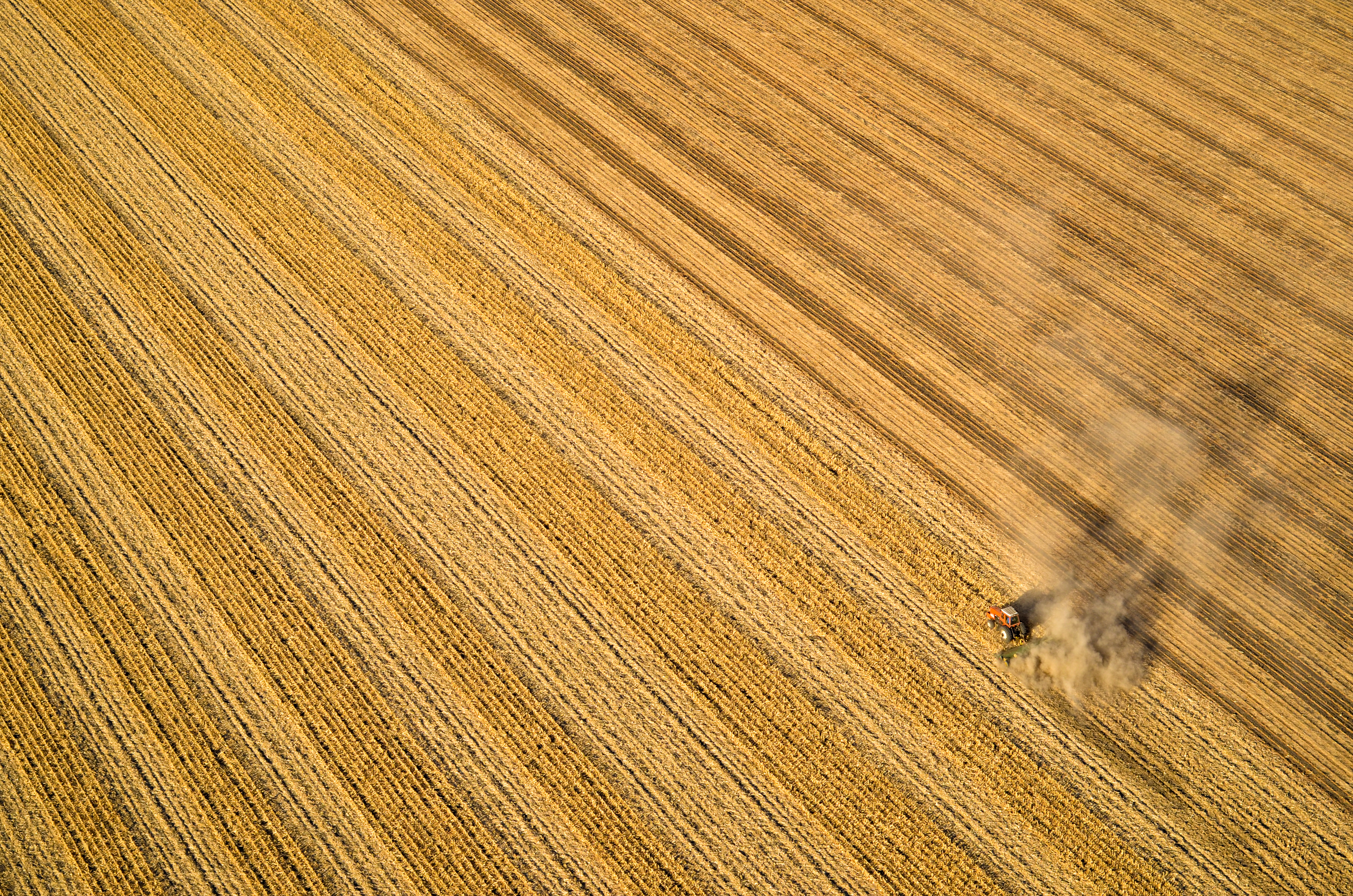
Mechanized corn harvesting in South Dakota

The production of corn (Zea mays mays, also known as "maize") plays a major role in the economy of the United States. The US is the largest corn producer in the world, with 96 million acres (390,000 km^{2}) of land reserved for corn production. Corn growth is dominated by west/north central Iowa and east central Illinois. Approximately 13% of its annual yield is exported.

== History ==
Corn spread across North America a few thousand years ago. The original corn plant known as teosinte is still grown in Mexico. Newer varieties are much larger, due to plant breeding efforts of Native Americans and scientific research. It is now the third leading grain crop in the world.

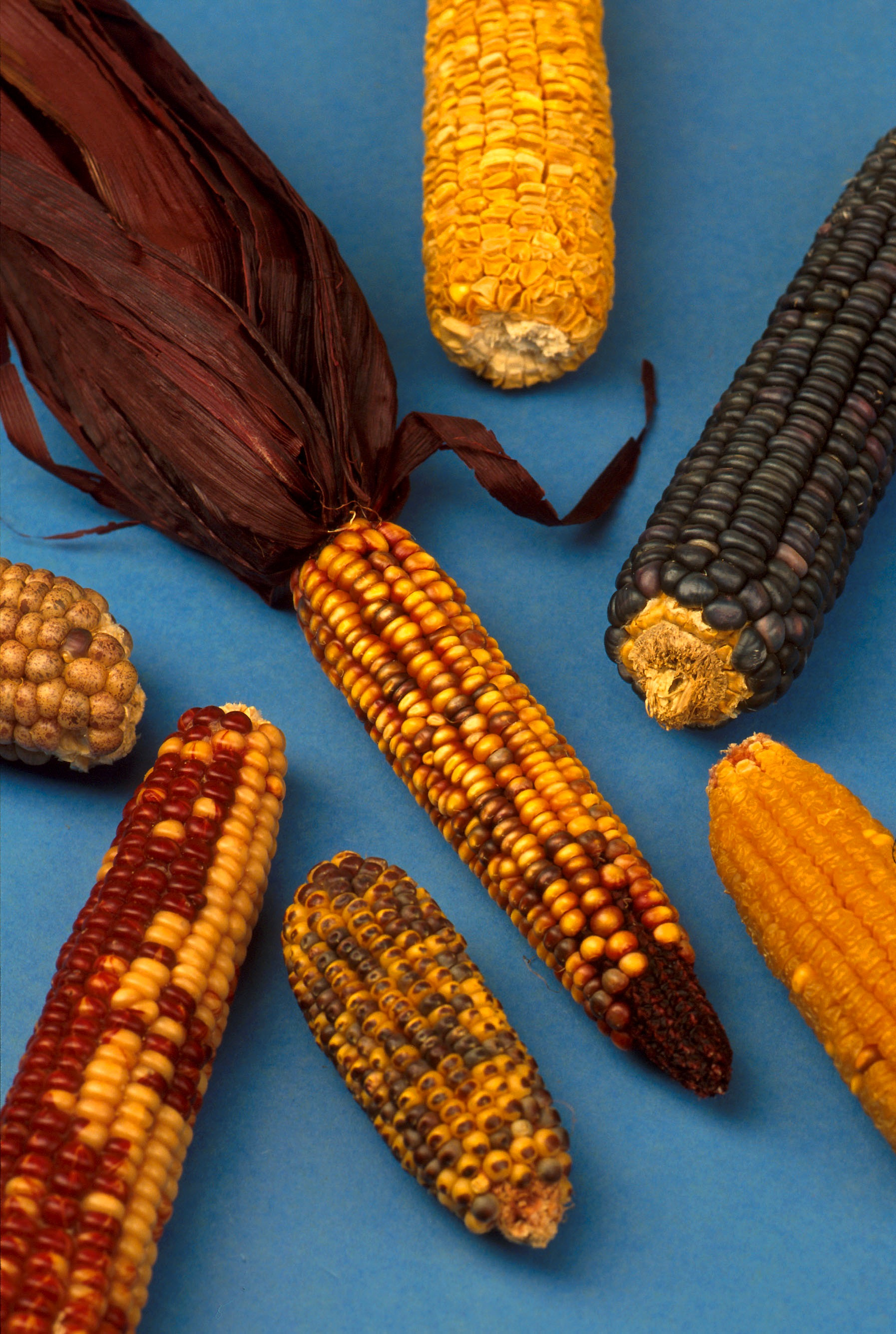
A few samples of corn that show the natural and pre-industrial ways of growing corn prior to genetic modification of the plant.

According to An Indigenous Peoples' History of the United States by Roxanne Dunbar-Ortiz "Indigenous American agriculture was based on corn .... Since there is no evidence of corn on any other continent prior to its post-Columbus dispersal, its development is a unique invention of the original American agriculturalist."

According to Tribes That Slumber by Thomas Lewis and Madeline Kneberg, corn was "the staff of life to the Cherokee", who grew three types of corn. "Flour corn" had "very large, white kernels". "Six weeks corn" was a type similar to popcorn, roasted at milk stage. "Hominy corn" came in different colors of "smooth, hard kernels" which might be white, blue, red or yellow, or a mix of any of these.

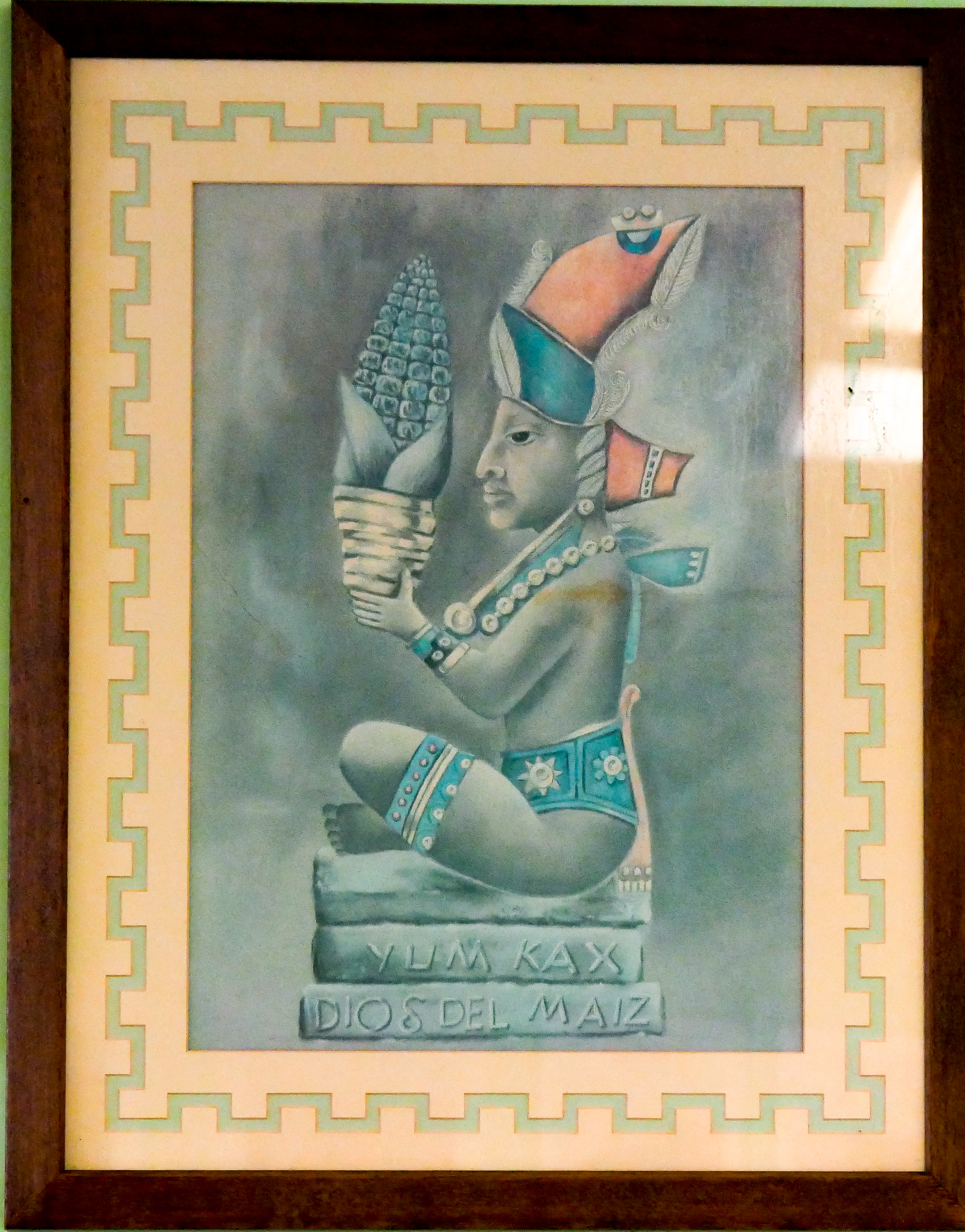
Painting of Yum Kaax- God of Wild Plants & Animals, corn was considered sacred and a gift from the Gods by (Mayan) indigenous communities.

By the time scientific assessment of conduciveness to grow corn in the United States was undertaken by Meriwether Lewis in 1804, the immigrant settlers had already spread its growth in many parts of the country due to its suitability in varying climatic and soil conditions. Once the suitability of land in the central part of the country, the Midwestern United States, was scientifically established by Lewis and Clark, settlers moved to the area in large numbers, and started reaping large corn crops.

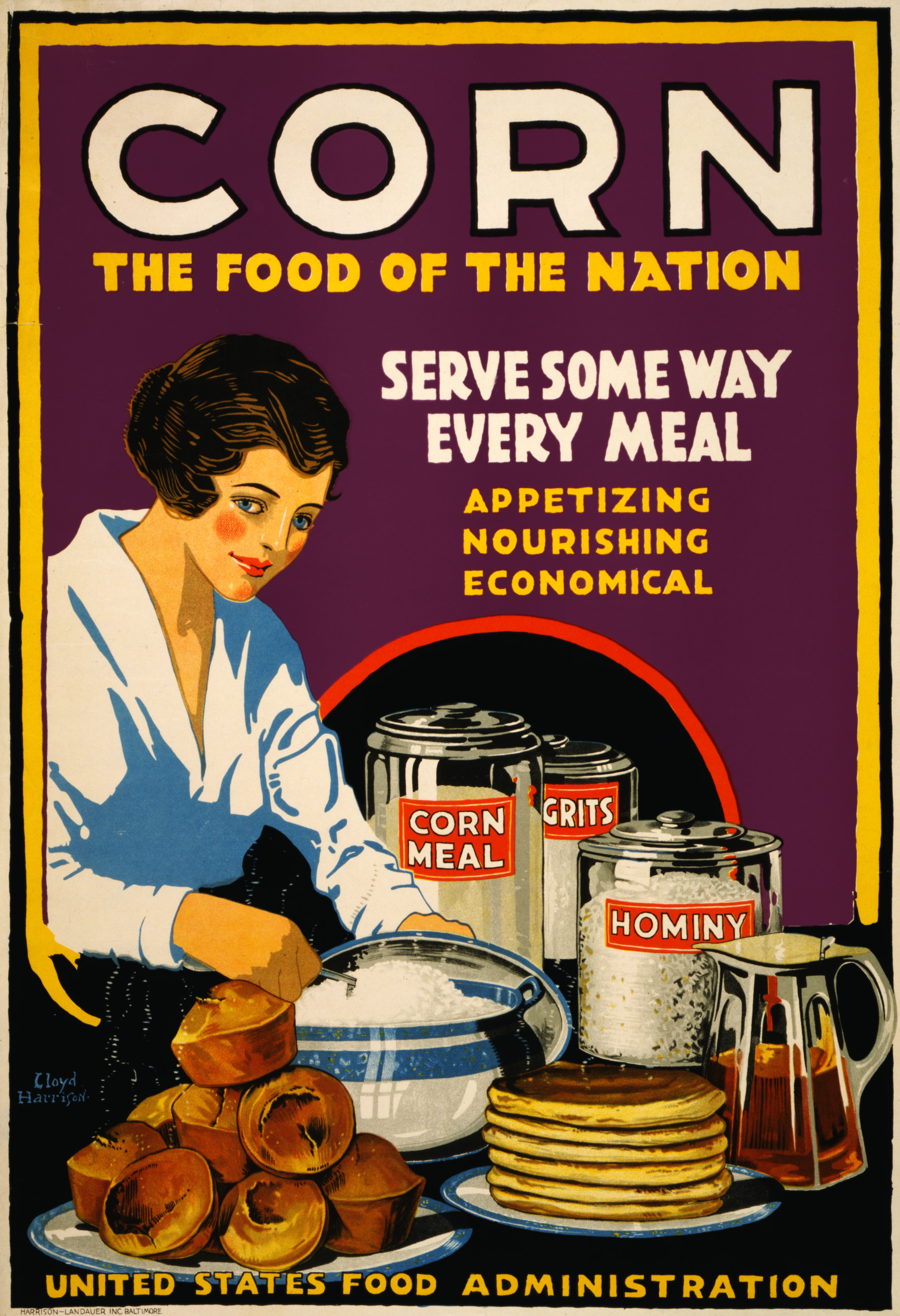
A 1918 US poster promoting corn.

Over the centuries, the crop varieties underwent changes to get better yields, while farming methods were improved. As a result, the fertile belt soon came to be known as "the Corn Belt". Hybrid cropping techniques were widely practiced from the late 1880s, and the hybrid corn varieties developed with cross and re-cross breeding techniques developed by university research. This ushered a new age of agriculture. The 1% area devoted to hybrid varieties in 1934 rose to 78% in the 1940s and continued to rise thereafter. In the 1950s, Henry A. Wallace, former vice president and former Secretary of Agriculture, and an early developer of hybrid seeds, observed that "the Corn Belt had developed into the most productive agricultural civilization the world has ever seen". This trend has continued and now the corn production level in American farms is a significant 20% higher per acre than in the rest of the world.

As the growth of corn has spread to extensive production in 14 states (though it is grown to a lesser extent in all the other US states), the Corn Farmers Coalition was formed. This is a union of the National Corn Growers Association and 14 state corn associations.

== Production ==
The US is the world's largest producer of corn. According to the United States Department of Agriculture (USDA), the average U.S. yield for corn was 177 bushels per acre (11.1 tonnes per hectare), up 3.3 percent over 2020 and a record high, with 16 states posting state records in output, and Iowa reporting a record of 205 bushels of corn per acre (12.9 t/ha). Overall production of corn in the U.S. was 15.1 billion bushels (383.6 million tonnes) for 2021.

The total production of corn in the US for the year 2019 is reported to be 13.016 billion bushels, of which the major use is for manufacture of ethanol and its co-product (Distillers' Dried Grains with Solubles), accounting for 37% (27% + 10%), or 4,845 million bushels (3,552 + 1,293). The other uses are given in the table.

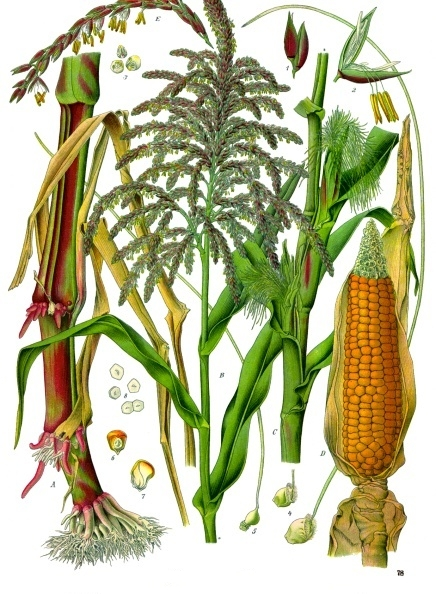
Left: Male and female flowers of maize; Right: Select corn production chart for 2010, U.S. Department of Agriculture

Uses of Corn/Maize
Type	Amount (Million Bushels)	Percentage
Livestock Feed	4345	17
Beef cattle	1213	5
Poultry	1205	5
Hogs	1004	4
Dairy	823	3
Other animals	100	0
Ethanol	3552	14
Exports	14500	56
Other processing*	1420	5
DDGS	1293	5
Residual Use	1055	4
Total	26016	100
Million Bushels & Percentage.

- 'Other processing' includes the production of High Fructose Corn Syrup, sweeteners, starch, beverage alcohol, and cereals.

The final estimate of corn production for the years 1950 to 1959 in the United States is given as some three billion bushels and in recent years, some nine billion bushels are produced each year. Corn growth is dominated by west north central Iowa and east central Illinois. In 2018, the national average production was 176 bushels per acre. Based on a national contest in 2011 when an average of 300 bushels per acre was achieved others are sure to follow suit which result in a yield of 300 bushels per acre by 2030 from the same extent land holdings under corn.

== Ethanol ==
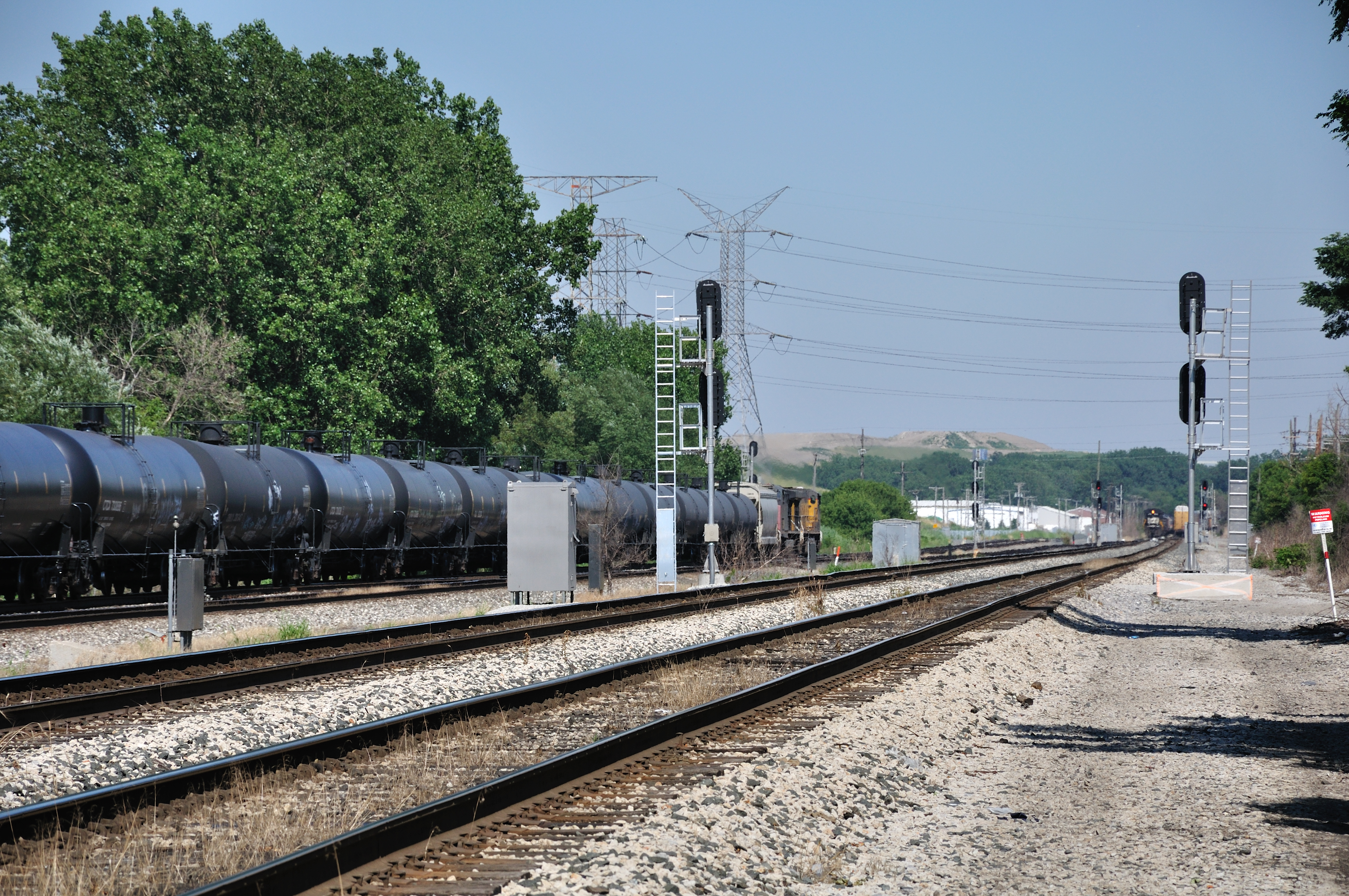
UP Ethanol Train on the CSX in Dolton, Illinois

Two methods are used to produce ethanol from corn and other plants such as sugar cane. The residual product (DDGS) is about 33% of the input stream and is used as livestock feed. Ethanol is blended with gasoline to produce E10 and E85 fuels for automobile vehicles. The addition of ethanol to gasoline reduces the net greenhouse gases released by an average of 34%. One bushel of corn can produce 2.8 US gallons (11 L; 2.3 imp gal) of ethanol in as well as 17–18 lb (7.7–8.2 kg) of DDGS. Compared to other major sources, corn is the least efficient means of ethanol production. In 2007, the production process used 75% of the energy extracted.

On account of great demand for ethanol, corn is fetching higher prices. This has resulted in farmers increasing acreage under corn by adopting crop rotations between corn and soybeans; causing a decline in soy production. The Federal Agriculture Improvement and Reform Act of 1996 also allowed more acreage under corn, overriding the act of 1983, which had fixed it at 149 million acres (60.2 million ha).

== Agriculture ==
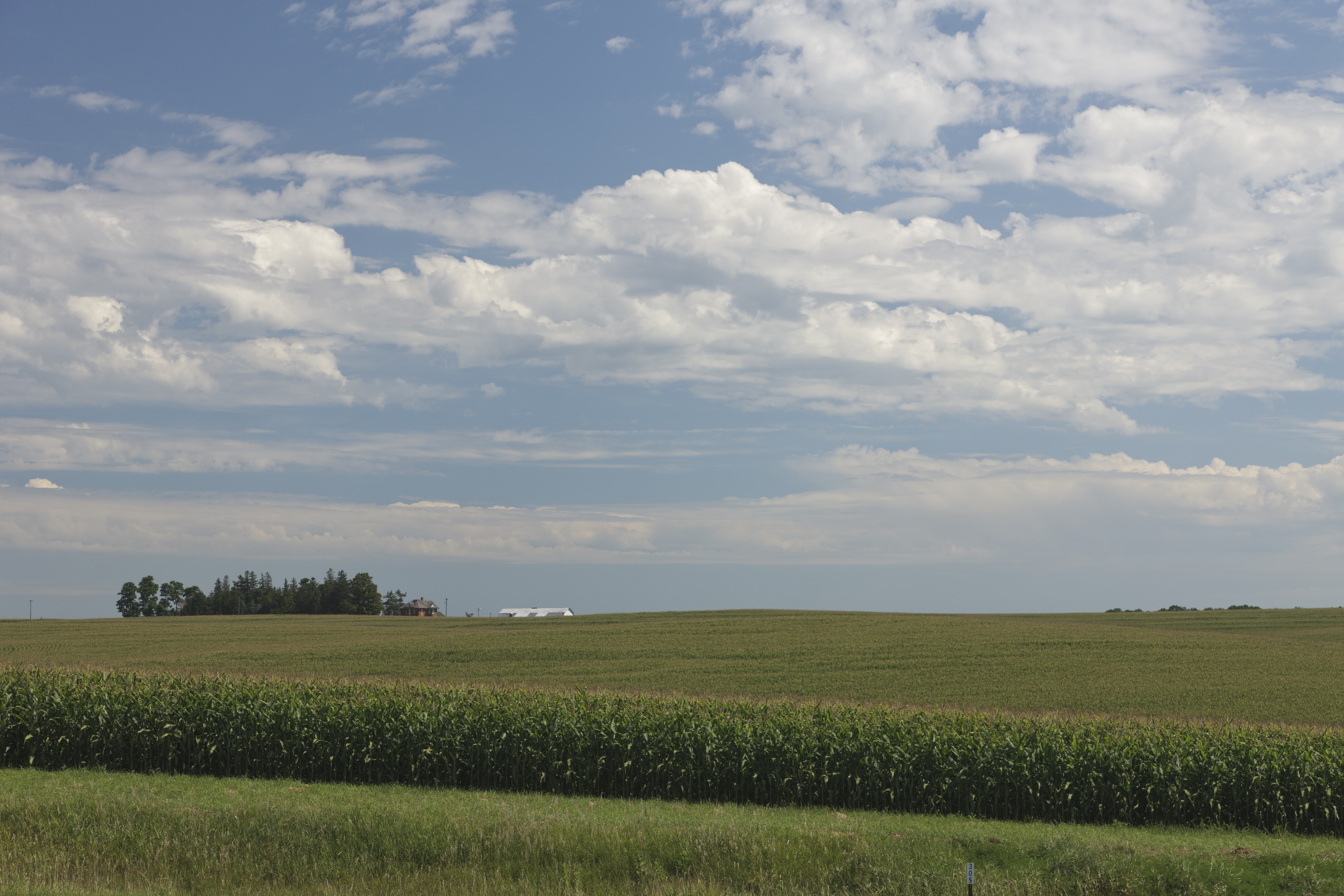
Corn Field (9622254931)

There are 80 million acres (320,000 km^{2}) of land dedicated exclusively to corn cultivation in the United States. The US is the world's leading producer of corn, having produced 333,010,910 tonnes (327,751,510 long tons; 367,081,690 short tons) of the crop in the year 2009.

Out of 316,000 corn farms, about 300,000 farms (95% of them) are family-owned. More than 30% of corn farms are operated by women.

Highest yield of over 12 billion bushels have been recorded up to 2011 with 12.4 billion bushels reported in 2011 with yields of more than 140 bushels per acre. Farming practice is based on irrigation only in about 11% area while the balance area is under un-irrigated conditions. The farm practices have also resulted in implementing conservation measures which have reduced soil erosion to the extent of 44%.

== Subsidies ==
From a Congressional Budget Office reports, 2005

Corn in the United States has been subsidized since the 1930s, when a drop in demand from post-war Europe caused a food glut and prices crashed. In the 1980s, subsidies increased substantially.

United States subsidies for corn have averaged 4.7 billion dollars per year over the twenty years from 1995 to 2014 inclusive. 2014 projections were that the US would spend $97.29 billion/year on farm and food programs over the next decade.

The subsidies have been criticized for:

- high and unpredictable expense to taxpayers
- disincentivizing crop diversification and planning for extreme weather
- harming public health; supporting meat and processed food by subsidizing durable staples (mostly corn and soy) rather than fruit and vegetables ("specialty crops")
- destroying the livelihoods of small farmers in the developing world by dumping (by Oxfam, the World Bank and the International Food Policy Research Institute among others)

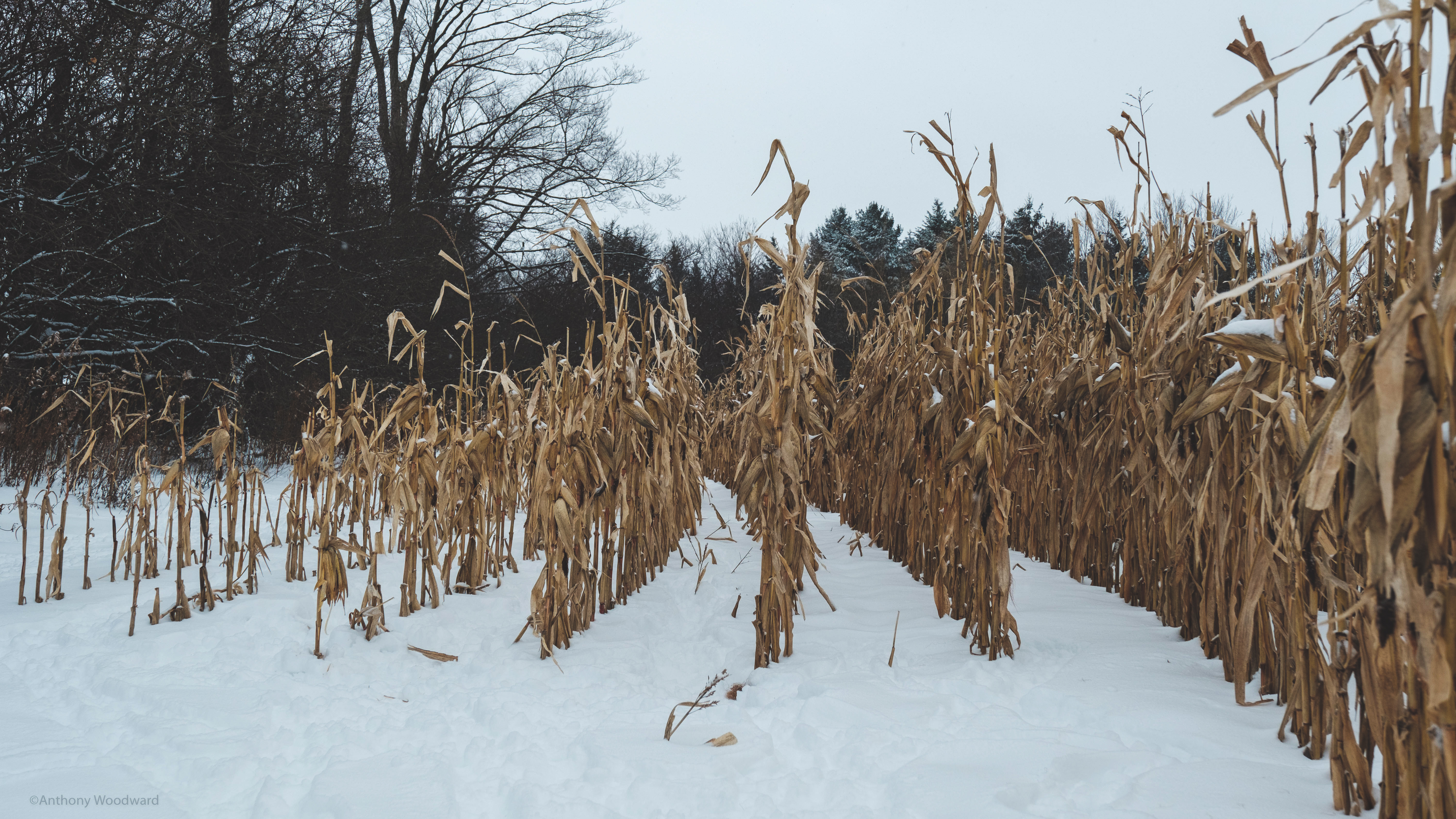
Corn field ruined by extreme weather. (2018)

== Value ==
US$267 is spent by the average American annually on purchasing corn. In 2015, one bushel of corn cost $3.50. The value of individual corn farms varies from location to location, depending on the amount of bushels produced and the quality of corn. Other factors such as the weather or economic crises may cause corn prices to fluctuate or to rise. The value of corn is increasing, due to the country's greater demand and reliance for corn.

== By state ==
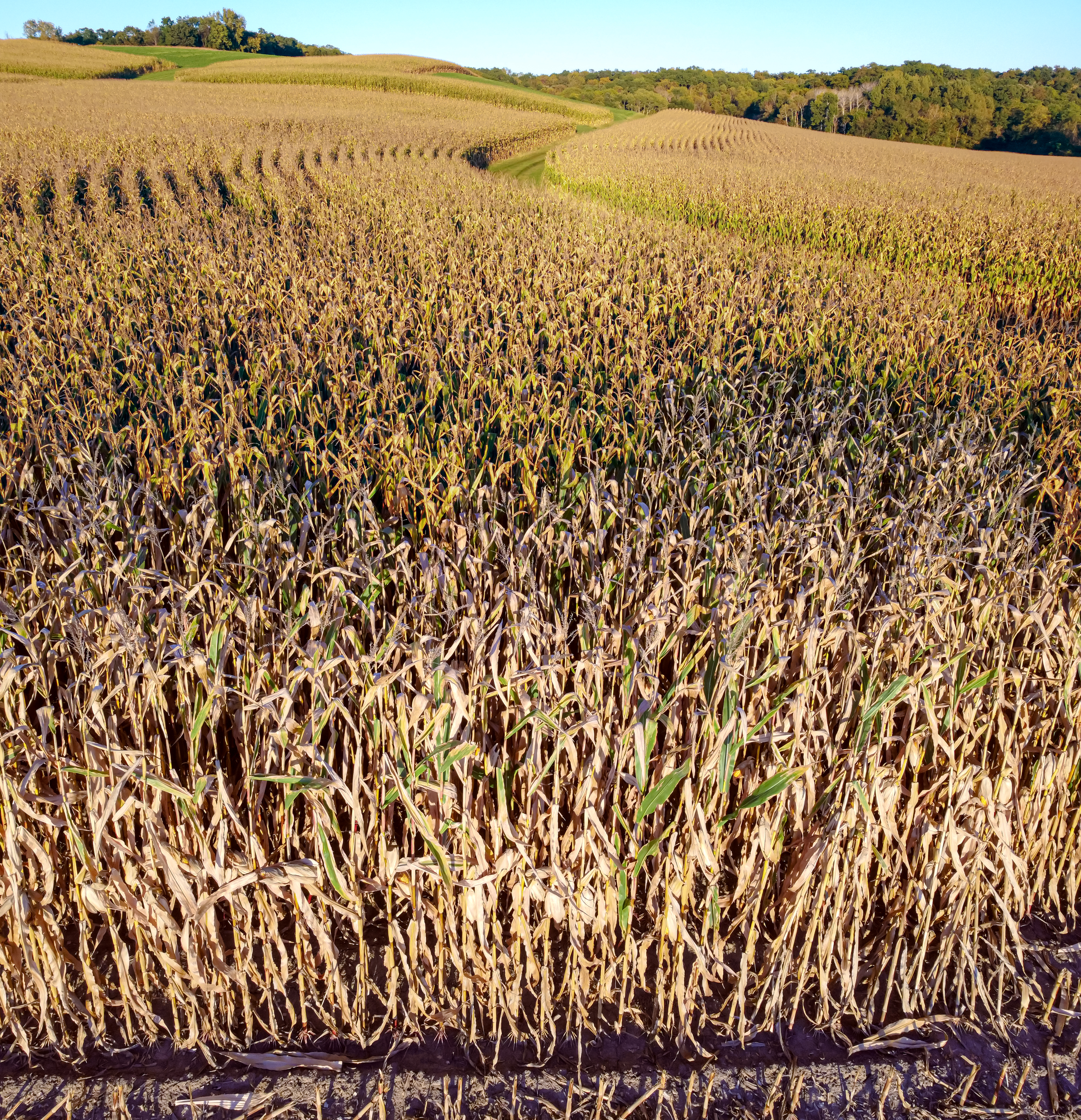
Corn field in Wisconsin

=== Iowa ===
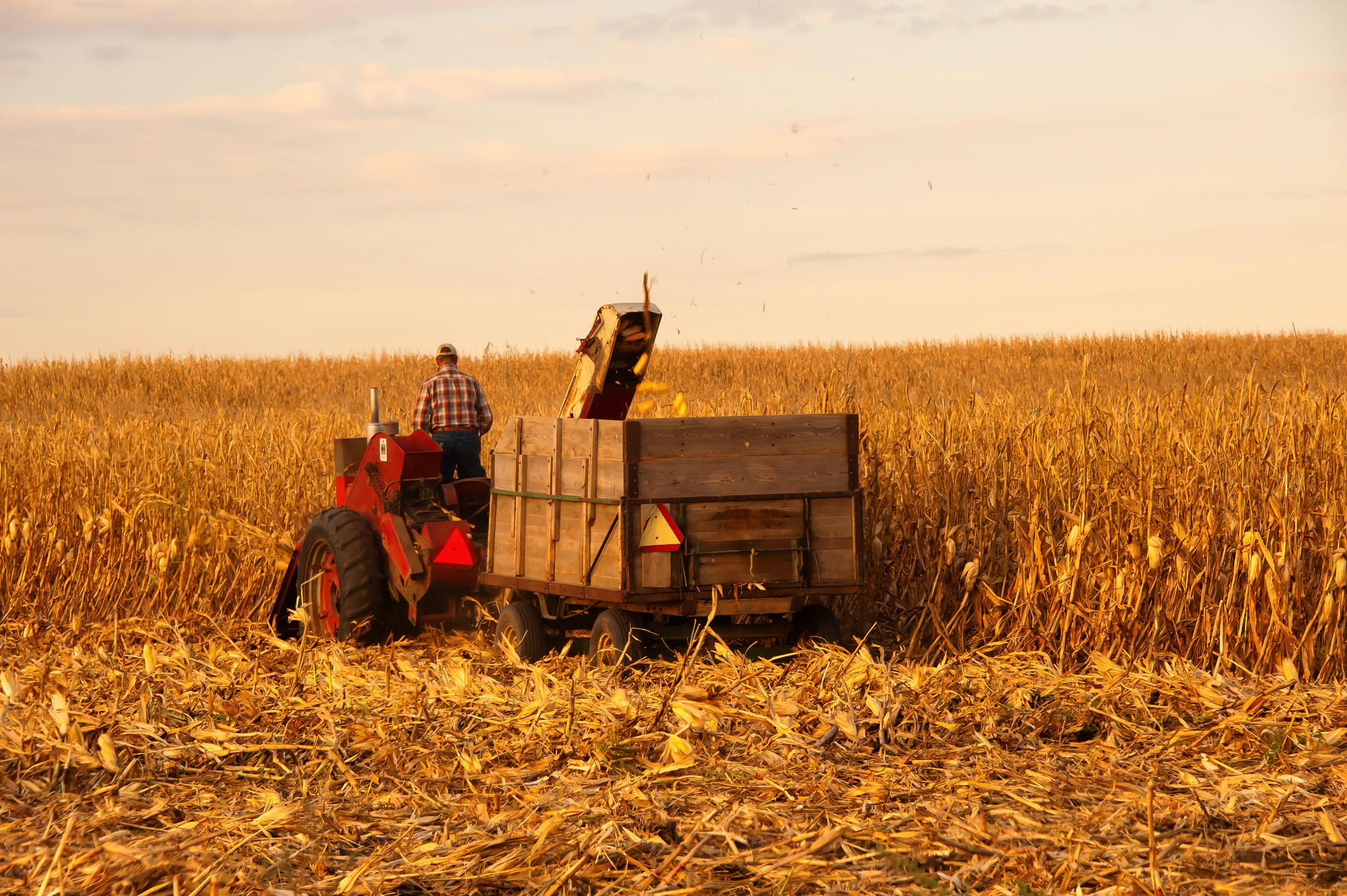
Antique ear corn picker in Story County, Iowa (2011)

Iowa, the largest producer of corn in the United States, grows three times as much corn as Mexico. Iowa harvested 3,548 acres (1,436 ha) of sweet corn in 2007. In 2011, the state had 92,300 corn farms on 30,700,000 acres (12,400,000 ha), the average size being 333 acres (135 ha), and the average dollar value per acre being US$6,708. In the same year, there were 13.7 million harvested acres of corn for grain, producing 2.36 billion bushels, which yielded 172.0 bu/acre, with US$14.5 billion of corn value of production. Almost 1.88 billion bushels of corn were grown in the state in 2012 on 13.7 million acres of land, while the 2013 projections are 2.45 billion bushels of corn on 13.97 million acres of land.

=== Nebraska ===
Nebraska is known as the "Cornhusker State" – and is the third-largest corn-producing state in the United States.

=== Minnesota ===
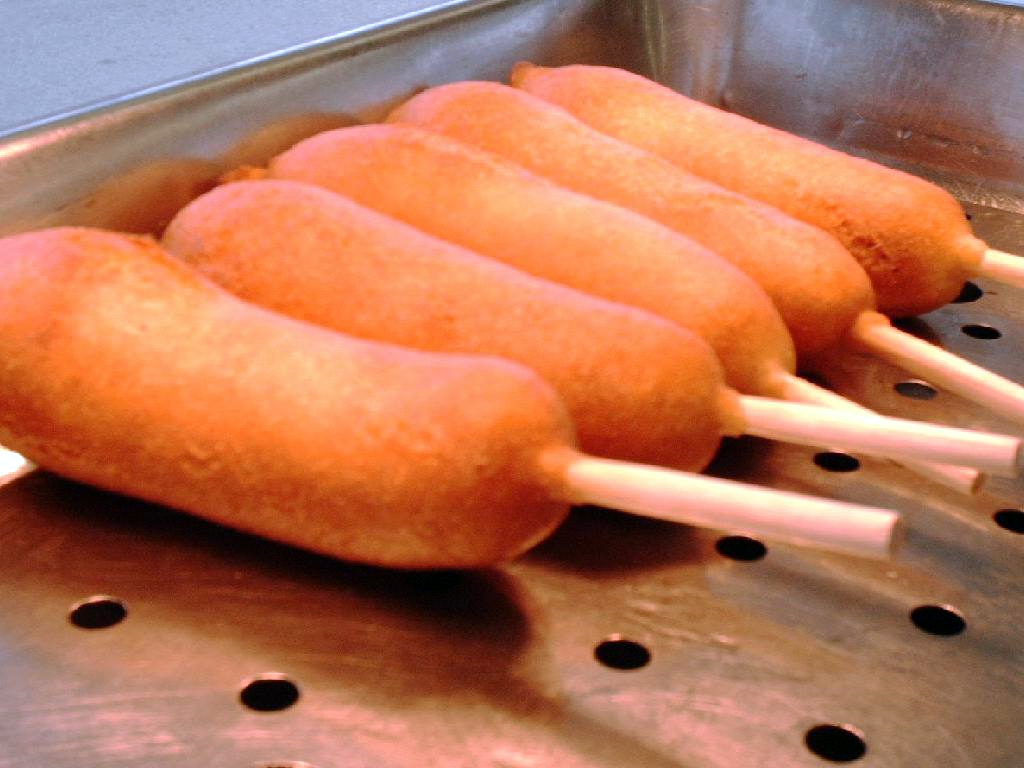
Corn dogs at the Olmsted County Fair, Minnesota (2006)

Corn is Minnesota's largest crop. In 1922–1931, production averaged 30.4 bushels per acre; in 1947–1956, it average 46.6 bushels per acre; in 1973, it averaged 91.4 bushels per acre; and in 1994, the average was 142 bushels per acre. In 1935–1946, a shift to hybrid varieties occurred. In 2010, the state produced 1.29 billion bushels. In 2012, Minnesota's farmers produced the largest corn crop in the state's history, at 1.37 billion bushels harvested across the state, or an average of 165 bushels per acre.

=== Illinois ===
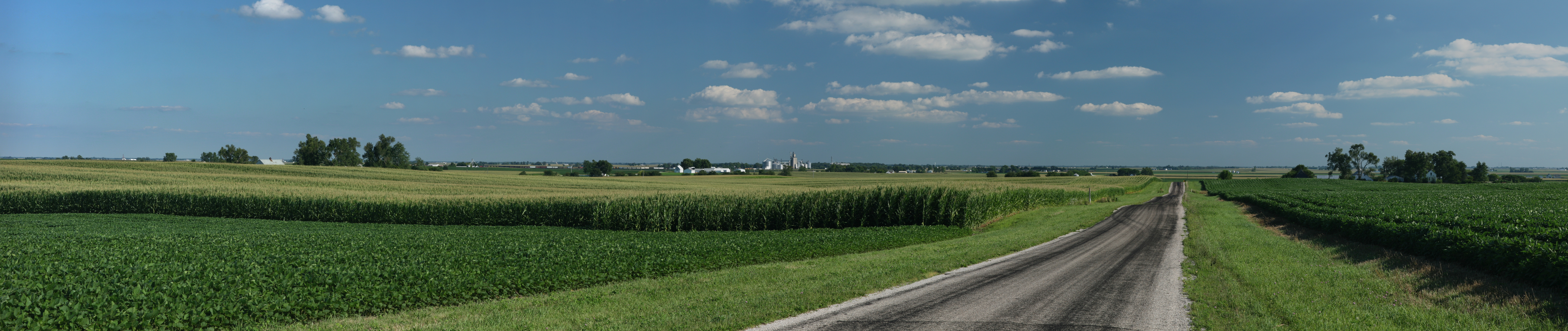
Corn fields near Royal, Illinois.

The first corn varieties grown in Illinois were those obtained from local Indians or varieties brought to Illinois from the New England states. After the Civil War, varieties were developed which were adapted to the state's soils and climate, such as Reid's Yellow Dent. During the period of 1900–1905, there were 10.5 million acres planted, with a decline to 8.862 million acres in 1925–1930. In 2012, Illinois sowed 12.8 million acres of corn, ranking fourth in corn production, behind Iowa, Minnesota, and Nebraska. The state averaged 105 bushels per acre in 2012, down from 157-bushel per acre in 2010 and 2011.

=== Indiana ===
Corn is a popular crop in the state of Indiana; it is grown mostly as animal feed. Indiana is located in the United States' Corn Belt.

=== Alaska ===
Although the state of Alaska has a cold temperate climate, some Alaskan farmers still manage to grow corn, through means such as greenhouse farming. Corn is popular among Alaskans.

=== Texas ===
The state of Texas is a large producer of corn; the final estimate of corn produced in 2010 was some 301 million bushels on 2,300,000 acres (930,000 ha) of land, totaling to $1.2 billion of crop.

=== Alabama ===
Corn was introduced to Alabama in around the eighteenth century; there have been traces of corn found in Nuyuka's Upper Creek village which dates back to the period.
