= Common ethanol fuel mixtures =

Mixtures of common ethanol fuel types

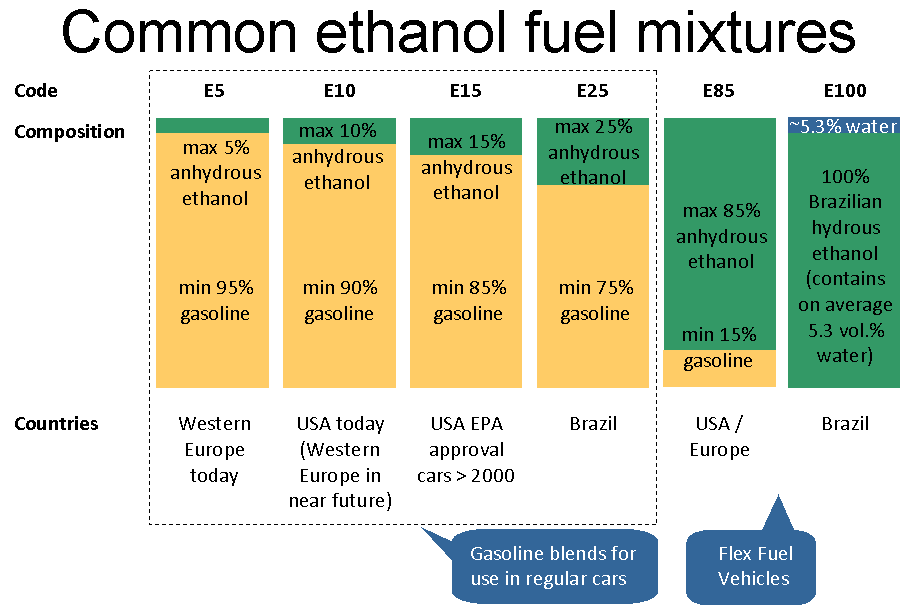
Summary of the main ethanol blends used around the world in 2013

Several common ethanol fuel mixtures are in use around the world. The use of pure hydrous or anhydrous ethanol in internal combustion engines (ICEs) is only possible if the engines are designed or modified for that purpose, and used only in automobiles, light-duty trucks and motorcycles. Anhydrous ethanol can be blended with gasoline (petrol) for use in gasoline engines, but with high ethanol content only after engine modifications to meter increased fuel volume since pure ethanol contains only 2/3 of the BTUs of an equivalent volume of pure gasoline. High percentage ethanol mixtures are used in some racing engine applications as the very high octane rating of ethanol is compatible with very high compression ratios.

Ethanol fuel mixtures have "E" numbers which describe the percentage of ethanol fuel in the mixture by volume, for example, E85 is 85% anhydrous ethanol and 15% gasoline. Low-ethanol blends are typically from E5 to E25, although internationally the most common use of the term refers to the E10 blend.

Blends of E10 or less are used in more than 20 countries around the world, led by the United States, where ethanol represented 10% of the U.S. gasoline fuel supply in 2011. Blends from E20 to E25 have been used in Brazil since the late 1970s. E85 is commonly used in the U.S. and Europe for flexible-fuel vehicles. Hydrous ethanol or E100 is used in Brazilian neat ethanol vehicles and flex-fuel light vehicles and hydrous E15 called hE15 for modern petrol cars in the Netherlands.

== E10 or less ==
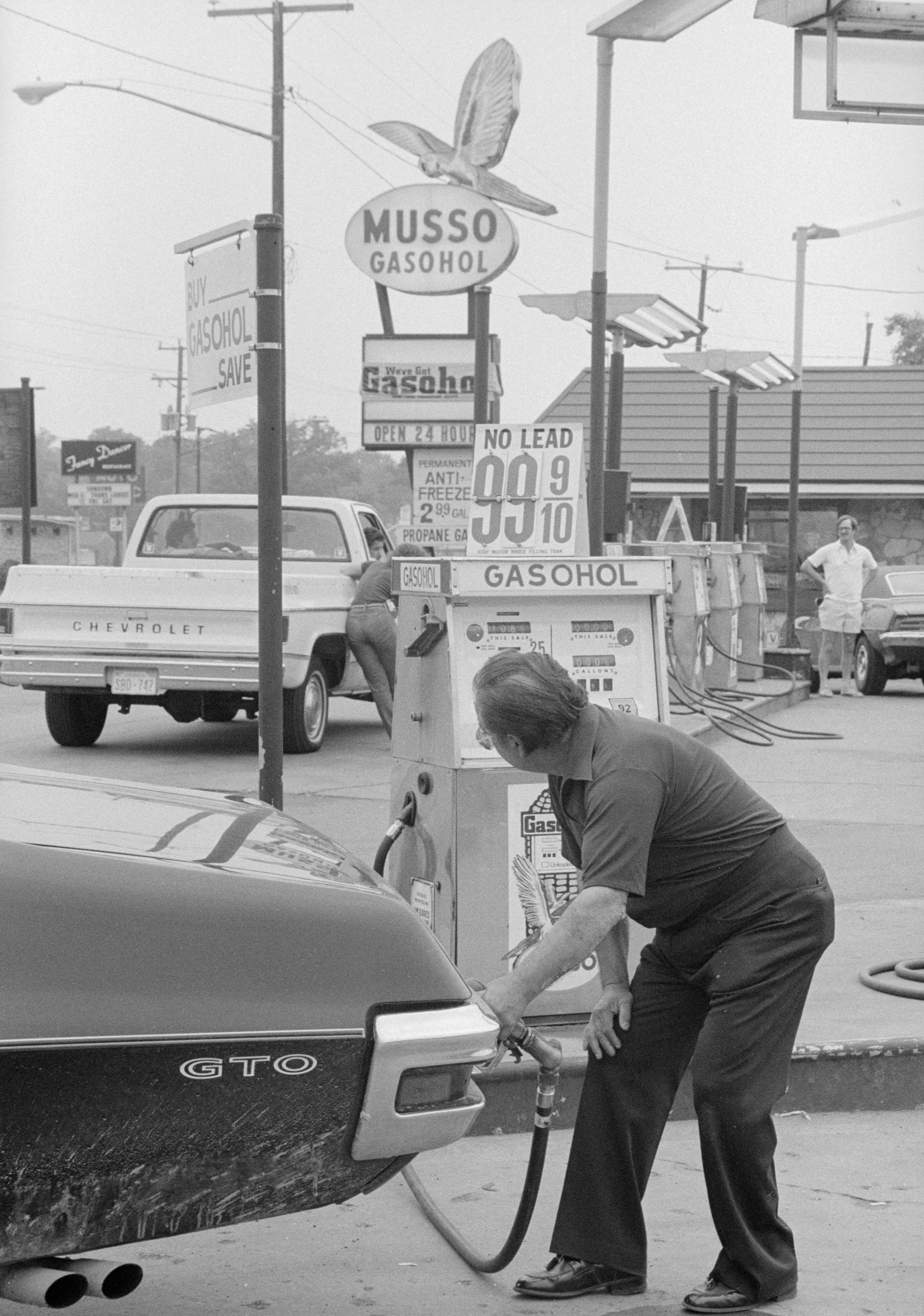
A man fueling his Pontiac GTO with gasohol in 1979

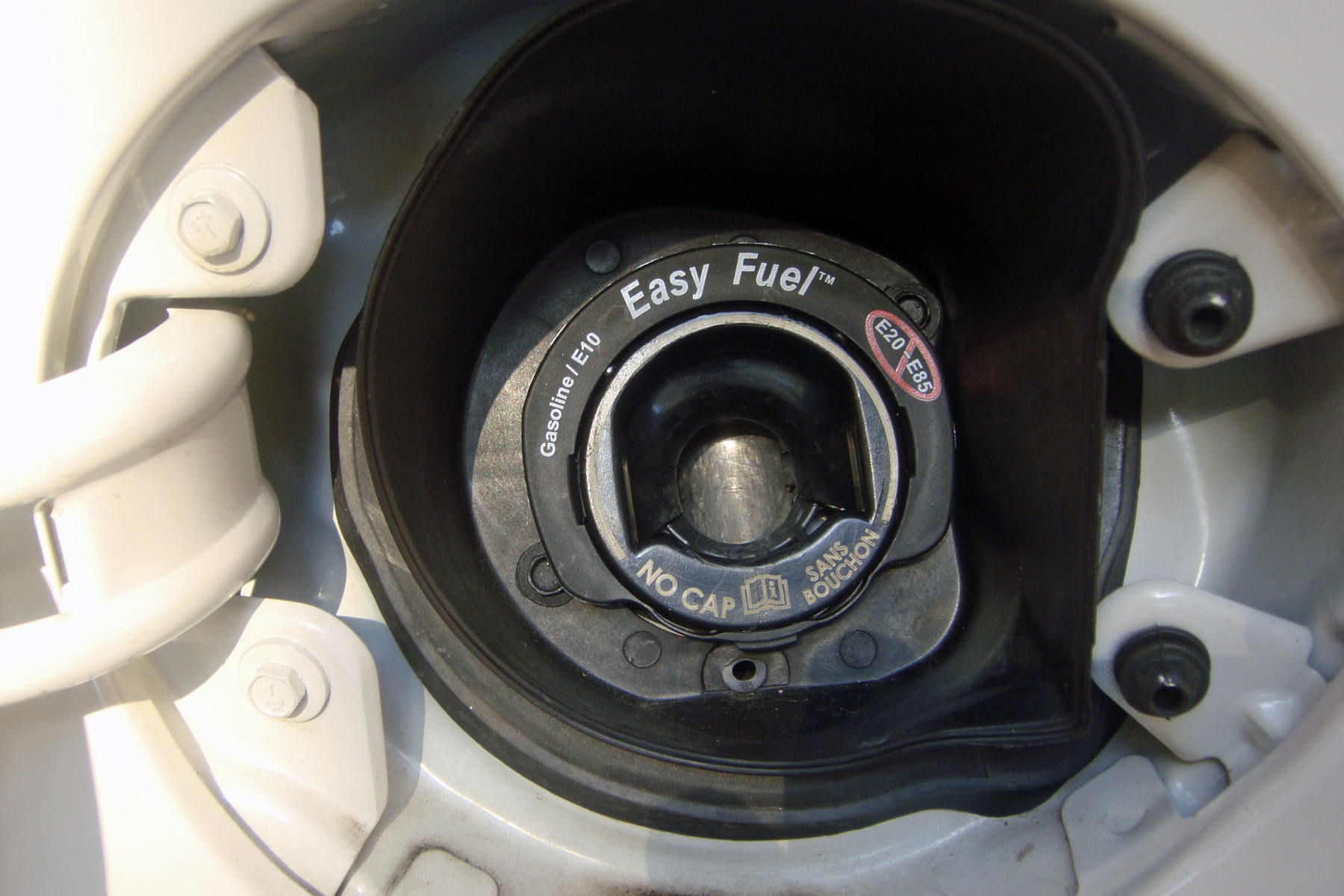
Typical warning placed in the fuel filler of U.S. vehicles regarding the capability of using up to E10 and warning against the use of blends between E20 and E85.

E10, a fuel mixture of 10% anhydrous ethanol and 90% gasoline sometimes called gasohol, can be used in the internal combustion engines of most modern automobiles and light-duty vehicles without need for any modification on the engine or fuel system. E10 blends are typically rated as being 2 to 3 octane numbers higher than regular gasoline and are approved for use in all new U.S. automobiles, and mandated in some areas for emissions and other reasons.

Other common blends include E5 and E7. These concentrations are generally safe for recent engines that should run on pure gasoline. As of 2006, mandates for blending bioethanol into vehicle fuels had been enacted in at least 36 states/provinces and 17 countries at the national level, with most mandates requiring a blend of 10 to 15% ethanol with gasoline.

One measure of alternative fuels in the U.S. is the "gasoline-equivalent gallon" (GEG). In 2002, the U.S. used as motor fuel, ethanol equal to 137,000 terajoules (3.8×10^{10} kWh), the energy equivalent of 1.13 billion US gallons (4.3 gigalitres) of gasoline. This was less than 1% of the total fuel used that year.

E10 and other blends of ethanol are considered to be useful in decreasing U.S. dependence on foreign oil, and can reduce carbon monoxide (CO) emissions by 20 to 30% under the right conditions. Although E10 does decrease emissions of CO and greenhouse gases such as CO_{2} by an estimated 2% over regular gasoline, it can cause increases in evaporative emissions and some pollutants depending on factors such as the age of the vehicle and weather conditions. According to the Philippine Department of Energy, the use of up to 10% ethanol-gasoline mixture is not harmful to cars' fuel systems. Generally, automobile gasoline containing alcohol (ethanol or methanol) is not recommended to be used in aircraft.

=== Availability ===
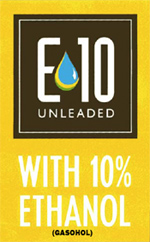
E10 Logo required on Delaware fuel dispensers

- E10 became the standard fuel at petrol stations in the United Kingdom as of September 2021.
- E10 was introduced nationwide in Thailand in 2007, and replaced 91 octane pure gasoline in that country in 2013.
- E10 is commonly available in the Midwestern United States. It was also mandated for use in all standard automobile fuel in the state of Florida by the end of 2010. Due to the phasing out of MTBE as a gasoline additive and mainly due to the mandates established in the Energy Policy Act of 2005 and the Energy Independence and Security Act of 2007, ethanol blends have increased throughout the United States, and by 2009, the ethanol market share in the U.S. gasoline supply reached almost 8% by volume.
- Mandatory blending of ethanol was approved in Mozambique, but the percentage in the blend has not been specified.
- South Africa approved a biofuel strategy in 2007, and mandated an 8% blend of ethanol by 2013.
- A 2007 Uruguayan law mandates a minimum of 5% of ethanol blended with gasoline starting in January 2015. The monopolic, state-owned fuel producer ANCAP started blending premium gasoline with 10% of bioethanol in December 2009, which will be available in all the country by early January 2010.
- The Dominican Republic has a mandate for blending 15% of ethanol by 2015.
- Chile is considering the introduction of E5, and Panama, Bolivia and Venezuela of E10.
- India achieved the target of 10 percent ethanol blending, 5 months ahead of schedule, in June 2022.
- From January 2018, all 92-octane fuel in Vietnam is mandated to contain 5 percent ethanol (E5). No ethanol blending is required for 95-octane fuel.
- From June 2021, Argentina approved an E12 minimum (Law 27640), and after October 2022 a waiver for a maximum of E15.

Low ethanol blends used around the world (E5 to E25)
Countries with mandatory blends or available for optional use						European Union			United States (states where mandatory only) (Note: Though mandated only in 10 states, ethanol blends in the U.S. are available in other states as optional or added without any labeling, making E blends present in two-thirds of the U.S. gasoline supply.)			
Country	Ethanol blend	Legal use	Country	Ethanol blend	Legal use	Country	Ethanol blend	Legal use	State	Ethanol blend	State	Ethanol blend
Argentina	E12	Mandated (Note: Actual blend is subject to ethanol availability. Blend for 2021 was 120% and expected to reach 12% in 2022)	Mexico	E6	Mandated (Note: Started in late 2011 in Guadalajara. Scheduled for Monterrey and Mexico City in 2012.)	Austria	E10	Optional	Florida	E10	Minnesota	E10
Australia	E10	Optional	New Zealand	E10	Optional	Denmark	E5	Optional	Hawaii	E10	Missouri	E10
Brazil	E18 - E27.5	Mandated	Pakistan	E10	Optional	Finland	E5/E10	Mandated	Iowa	E10	Montana	E10
Canada	E5	Mandated (Note: Starting on December 15, 2010.)	Paraguay	E18/24	Mandated	France	E5/E10	Optional	Kansas	E10	Oregon	E10 (Note: The State of Oregon exempted premium unleaded gasoline (91octane or higher) from the 10% ethanol mandate for road use since January 2010.)
China	E10	Nine provinces	Peru	E8	Mandated (Note: Actual blend is 7.8% ethanol (E8) and mandatory only in certain regions. Sales of E8 began in April 2010 in nine regions in northern Peru, and in July 2011 in the Lima-Callao metropolitan area.)	Germany	E5/E10	Optional (Note: E5 is scheduled to be phased out in 2013)	Louisiana	E10	Washington	E10
Colombia	E10	Mandated (Note: In Colombia mandatory blend was enforced only in cities with more than 500.000 inhabitants.)	Philippines	E10	Mandated	Ireland	E4	Mandated	California	E10		
Costa Rica	E7	Mandated (Note: Mandatory blend scheduled for 2009 was postponed. Sales of E7 continue in the original trial region in the Guanacaste Province and six municipalities in the Puntarenas Province. Nationwide availability rescheduled to begin in June 2012.)	Thailand	E10/E20	Mandated	Netherlands	E5/E10/hE15	Optional				
India	E20	Mandated	Vietnam	E5/E10	Mandated	Romania	E4	Mandated				
Jamaica	E10	Mandated (Note: Since November 1, 2008 became available in some cities and will become mandatory in May 2009.)	Zimbabwe	E20	Mandated	Sweden	E5/E10	Mandated				
Malawi	E10	Mandated (Note: Actual blend is subject to ethanol availability)	Uruguay	E8.5 - E10	Mandated							
See the country notes at the end of the article

A 2011 study conducted by VTT Technical Research Centre of Finland found practically no difference in fuel consumption in normal driving conditions between commercial gasoline grades 95E10 and 98E5 sold in Finland, despite the public perception that fuel consumption is significantly higher with 95E10. VTT performed the comparison test under controlled laboratory conditions and their measurements showed that over a distance of 100 kilometres (62 mi), the cars tested used an average of 10.30 litres (2.27 imp gal; 2.72 US gal) of 95E10, as opposed to 10.23 litres (2.25 imp gal; 2.70 US gal) of 98E5. The difference was 0.07 in favor of 98E5 on average, meaning that using 95E10 gasoline, which has a higher ethanol content, increases consumption by 0.7%. When the measurements are normalized, the difference becomes 1.0%, a result that is highly consistent with an estimation of calorific values based on approximate fuel composition, which came out at 1.1% in favour of E5.

==== Sweden ====
Reduction mandate of greenhouse emissions from fossil fuels in Sweden by means of biofuel mixtures (%)
Year	Gasoline	Diesel	Jet kerosene
2020	4.2	21	-
2021	6.0 (1 Aug)	26 (1 Aug)	0.8 (1 July)
2022	7.8	30.5	1.7
2023	~~10.1~~; 7.8 **	~~35~~; 30.5 **	2.6
2024	~~12.5~~; 6*	~~40~~; 6*	3.5
2025	~~15.5~~; 6*	~~45~~; 6*	4.5
2026	~~19~~; 6*	~~50~~; 6*	7.2
2027	~~22~~ *	~~54~~ *	10.8
2028	~~24~~ *	~~58~~ *	15.3
2029	~~26~~ *	~~62~~ *	20.7
2030	~~28~~ *	~~66~~ *	27
*) The reduction was reduced to the EU minimum level (6 percent for petrol and diesel) according to a bill by the Kristersson Cabinet in 2023. **)Further reduction was paused during 2023 based on a bill by the Andersson Cabinet.

In Sweden, all 95-octane gasoline is E10 (6 to 10 percent of ethanol) since 1 August 2021, when the proportion of ethanol was increased from E5. In the early-mid-1990s, some fuel chains also sold E10. All newer and many older petrol cars bought in Sweden should handle this, since from January 2011, the Fuel Quality Directive (Directive 2009/30/EC) applied through its transposition into the law of Sweden as a member of the 27 member states of the EU.

== E15 ==
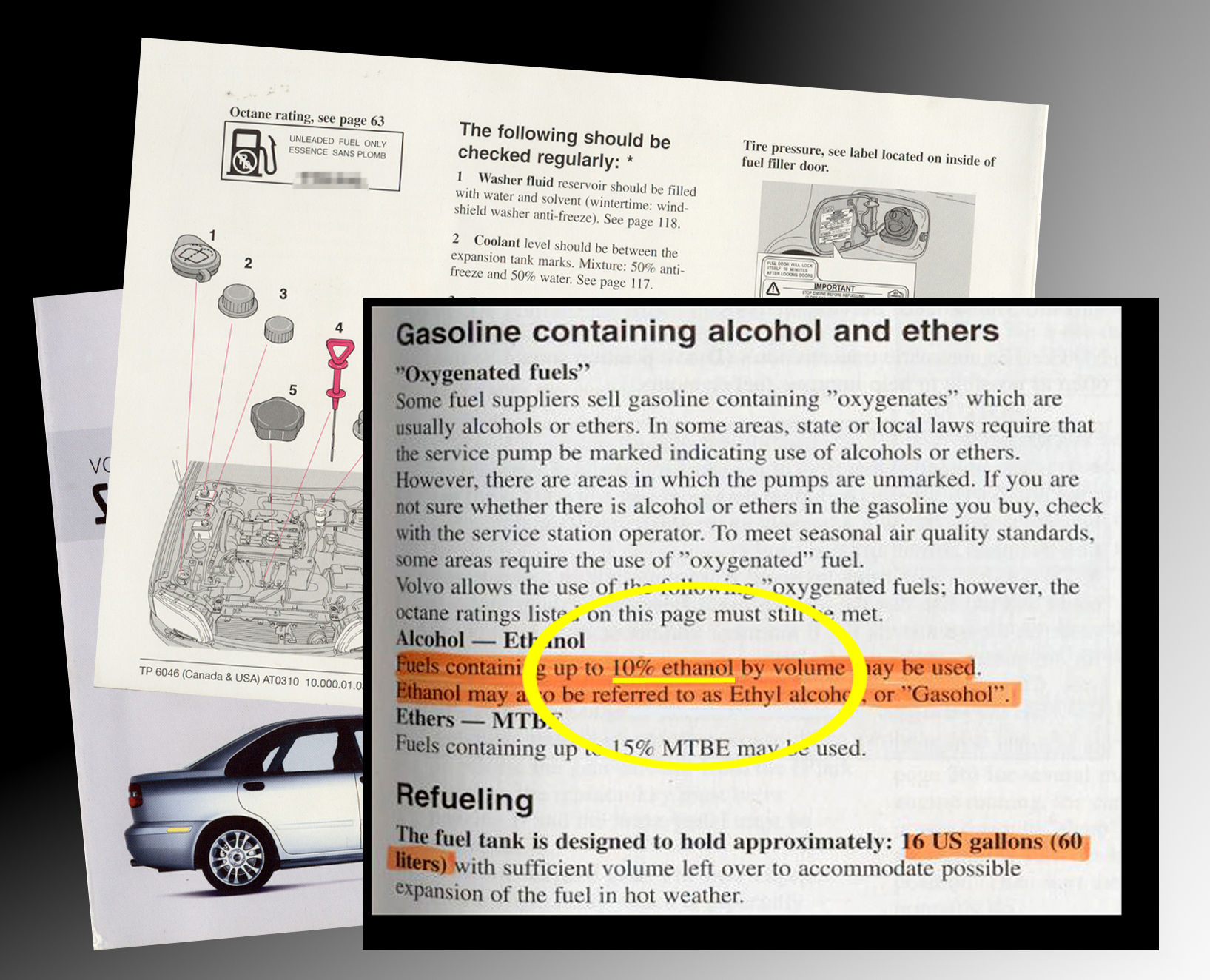
Typical manufacturer's statement in the car owner's manual regarding the vehicle's capability of using up to E10.

E15 contains 15% ethanol and 85% gasoline. This is generally the highest ratio of ethanol to gasoline that is possible to use in vehicles recommended by some auto manufacturers to run on E10 in the US. This is due to ethanol's hydrophilia and solvent power.

As a result of the Energy Independence and Security Act of 2007, which mandates an increase in renewable fuels for the transport sector, the U.S. Department of Energy began assessments for the feasibility of using intermediate ethanol blends in the existing vehicle fleet as a way to allow higher consumption of ethanol fuel. The National Renewable Energy Laboratory (NREL) conducted tests to evaluate the potential impacts of intermediate ethanol blends on legacy vehicles and other engines. In a preliminary report released in October 2008, the NREL presented the results of the first evaluations of the effects of E10, E15 and E20 gasoline blends on tailpipe and evaporative emissions, catalyst and engine durability, vehicle driveability, engine operability, and vehicle and engine materials. This preliminary report found none of the vehicles displayed a malfunction indicator light as a result of the ethanol blend used; no fuel filter plugging symptoms were observed; no cold start problems were observed at 24 °C (75 °F) and 10 °C (50 °F) laboratory conditions; and as expected, computer technology available in newer model vehicles adapts to the higher octane causing lower emissions with greater horsepower and in some cases greater fuel economy.

Other sources make the opposite claim about fuel economy. According to Consumer Reports, "ethanol isn’t as energy-dense as regular gasoline so you will see worse fuel economy with E15 gas.”

In March 2009, a lobbying group from the ethanol industry, Growth Energy, formally requested the U.S. Environmental Protection Agency (EPA) to allow the ethanol content in gasoline to be increased from 10% to 15%. Organizations doing such studies included the Energy Department, the State of Minnesota, the Renewable Fuels Association, the Rochester Institute of Technology, the Minnesota Center for Automotive Research, and Stockholm University in Sweden.

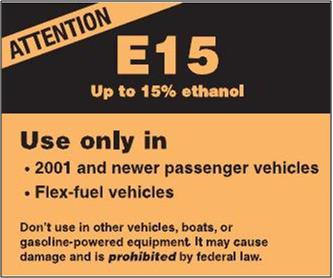
EPA's E15 label required to be displayed in all E15 fuel dispensers in the U.S.

In October 2010, the EPA granted a waiver to allow up to 15% of ethanol blended with gasoline to be sold only for cars and light pickup trucks with a model year of 2007 or later, representing about 15% of vehicles on U.S. roads. In January 2011, the waiver was expanded to authorize use of E15 to include model year 2001 through 2006 passenger vehicles. The EPA also decided not to grant any waiver for E15 use in any motorcycles, heavy-duty vehicles, or nonroad engines because current testing data do not support such a waiver. According to the Renewable Fuels Association, the E15 waivers now cover 62% of vehicles on the road in the US, and the ethanol group estimates if all 2001 and newer cars and pickups were to use E15, the theoretical blend wall for ethanol use would be approximately 17.5 billion gallons (66.2 billion liters) per year. The EPA was still studying if older cars can withstand a 15% ethanol blend.

The EPA waiver authorizes sale of E15 only from Sep 15 to May 31 out of a black hose and a yellow hose to flex fuel vehicles only from June 1 to Sep 14. Retailers have shunned building infrastructure due to the costly regulatory requirements which have created a practical barrier to the commercialization of the higher blend. Most fuel stations do not have enough pumps to offer the new blend, few existing pumps are certified to dispense E15, and no dedicated tanks are readily available to store E15. Also, some state and federal regulations would have to change before E15 can be legally sold. The National Association of Convenience Stores, which represents most gasoline retailers, considers the potential for actual E15 demand is small, "because the auto industry is not embracing the fuel and is not adjusting their warranties or recommendations for the fuel type." One possible solution to the infrastructure barriers is the introduction of blender pumps that allow consumers to turn a dial to select the level of ethanol, which would also allow owners of flexible-fuel cars to buy E85 fuel.

In June 2011 EPA, in cooperation with the Federal Trade Commission, issued its final ruling regarding the E15 warning label required to be displayed in all E15 fuel dispensers in the U.S. to inform consumers about what vehicles can, and what vehicles and equipment cannot, use the E15 blend. Both the Alliance of Automobile Manufacturers and the National Petrochemical and Refiners Association complained that relying solely on this warning label is not enough to protect consumers from misfueling. In July 2012, a fueling station in Lawrence, Kansas became the first in the U.S. to sell the E15 blend. The fuel is sold through a blender pump that allows customers to choose between E10, E15, E30 or E85, with the latter blends sold only to flexible-fuel vehicles. As of June 2013, there are about 24 fueling stations selling E15 out of 180,000 stations across the U.S.

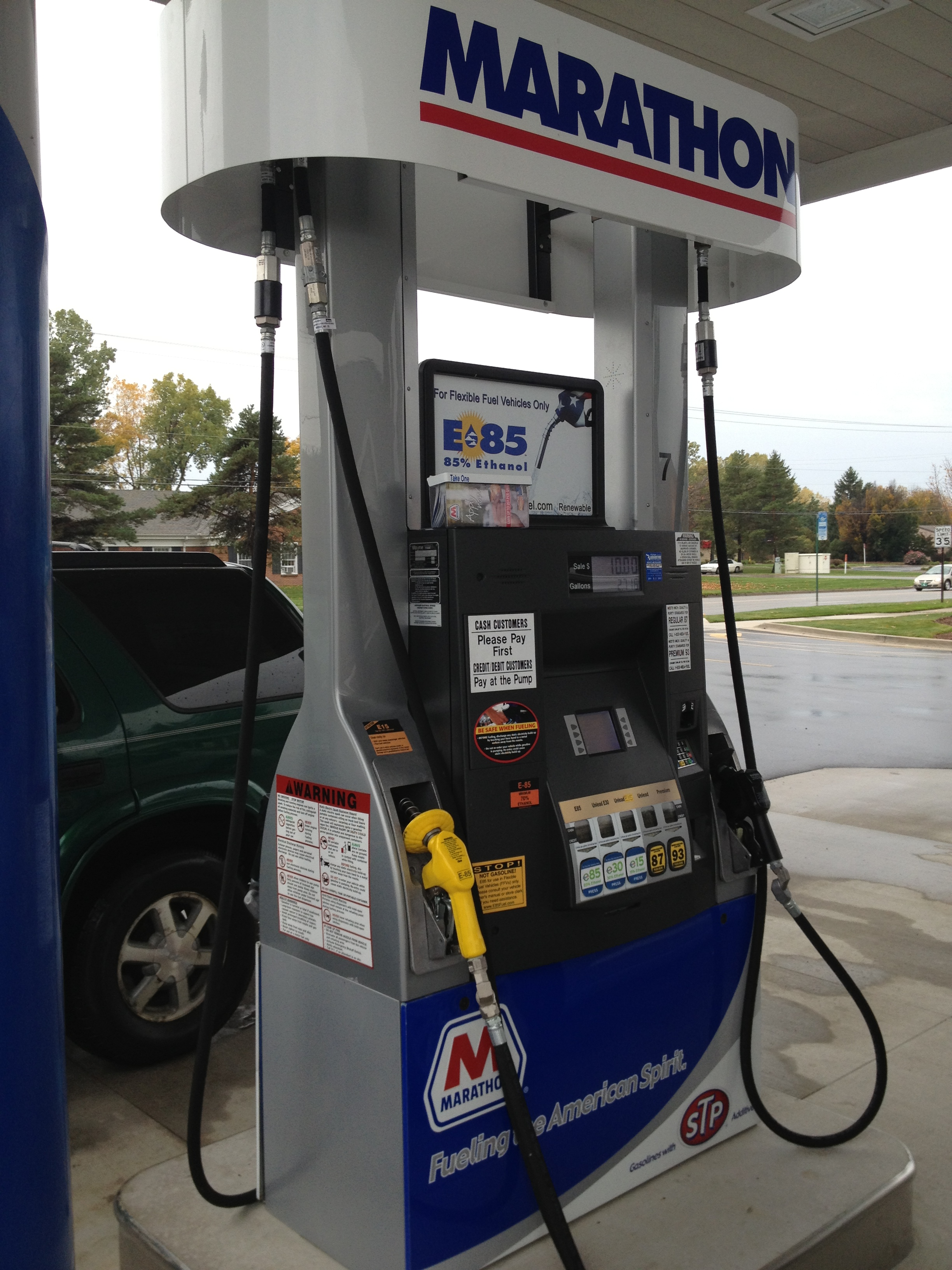
Blender fuel pump in East Lansing, Michigan selling E15 together with the standard gasoline (E10), and the higher blends E30 and E85.

In December 2010, several groups, including the Alliance of Automobile Manufacturers, the American Petroleum Institute, the Association of International Automobile Manufacturers, the National Marine Manufacturers Association, the Outdoor Power Equipment Institute, and the Grocery Manufacturers Association, filed suit against the EPA in the United States Court of Appeals for the District of Columbia Circuit. The plaintiffs argued the EPA does not have the authority to issue a “partial waiver” that covers some cars and not others. Among other arguments, the groups argued that the higher ethanol blend is not only a problem for cars, but also for fuel pumps and underground tanks not designed for the E15 mixture. It was also argued that the rise in ethanol has contributed to the big jump in corn prices in recent years. In August 2012, the federal appeals court rejected the suit against the EPA. The case was thrown out on a technical reason, as the court ruled the groups did not have legal standing to challenge EPA's decision to issue the waiver for E15. In June 2013 the U.S. Supreme Court declined to hear an appeal from industry groups opposed to the EPA ruling about E15, and let the 2012 federal appeals court ruling stand.

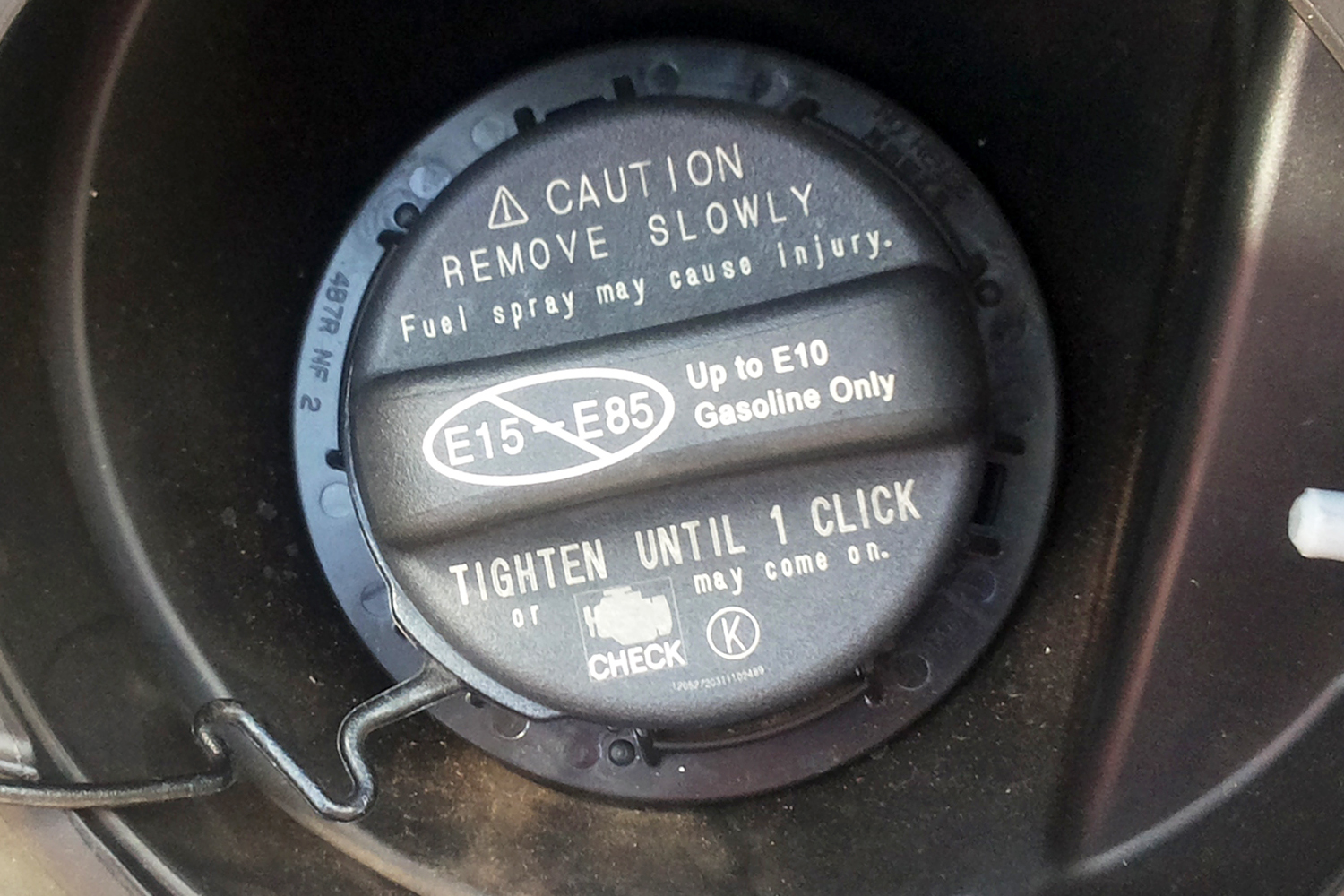
2012 Toyota Camry Hybrid fuel filler cap showing warning regarding the maximum ethanol blend allowed by the carmaker, up to E10 gasoline. The warning label indicates that ethanol blends between E15 and E85 shall not be used in this vehicle.

As of November 2012, sales of E15 are not authorized in California, and according to the California Air Resources Board (CARB), the blend is still awaiting approval, and in a public statement the agency said that "it would take several years to complete the vehicle testing and rule development necessary to introduce a new transportation fuel into California's market."

According to a survey conducted by the American Automobile Association (AAA) in 2012, only about 12 million out of the more than 240 million light-duty vehicles on the U.S. roads in 2012 are approved by manufacturers are fully compliant with E15 gasoline. According with the association, BMW, Chrysler, Nissan, Toyota, and Volkswagen warned that their warranties will not cover E15-related damage. Despite the controversy, in order to adjust to EPA regulations, 2012 and 2013 model year vehicles manufactured by General Motors can use fuel containing up to 15 percent ethanol, as indicated in the vehicle owners' manuals. However, the carmaker warned that for model year 2011 or earlier vehicles, they "strongly recommend that GM customers refer to their owners manuals for the proper fuel designation for their vehicles." Ford Motor Company also is manufacturing all of its 2013 vehicles E15 compatible, including hybrid electrics and vehicles with Ecoboost engines. Also Porsches built since 2001 are approved by its manufacturer to use E15. Volkswagen announced that for the 2014 model year, its entire lineup will be E15 capable. Fiat Chrysler Automobiles announced in August 2015 that all 2016 model year Chrysler/Fiat, Jeep, Dodge and Ram vehicles will be E15 compatible.

In November 2013, the Environmental Protection Agency opened for public comment its proposal to reduce the amount of ethanol required in the U.S. gasoline supply as mandated by the Energy Independence and Security Act of 2007. The agency cited problems with increasing the blend of ethanol above 10%. This limit, known as the "blend wall," refers to the practical difficulty in incorporating increasing amounts of ethanol into the transportation fuel supply at volumes exceeding those achieved by the sale of nearly all gasoline as E10.

== hE15 ==
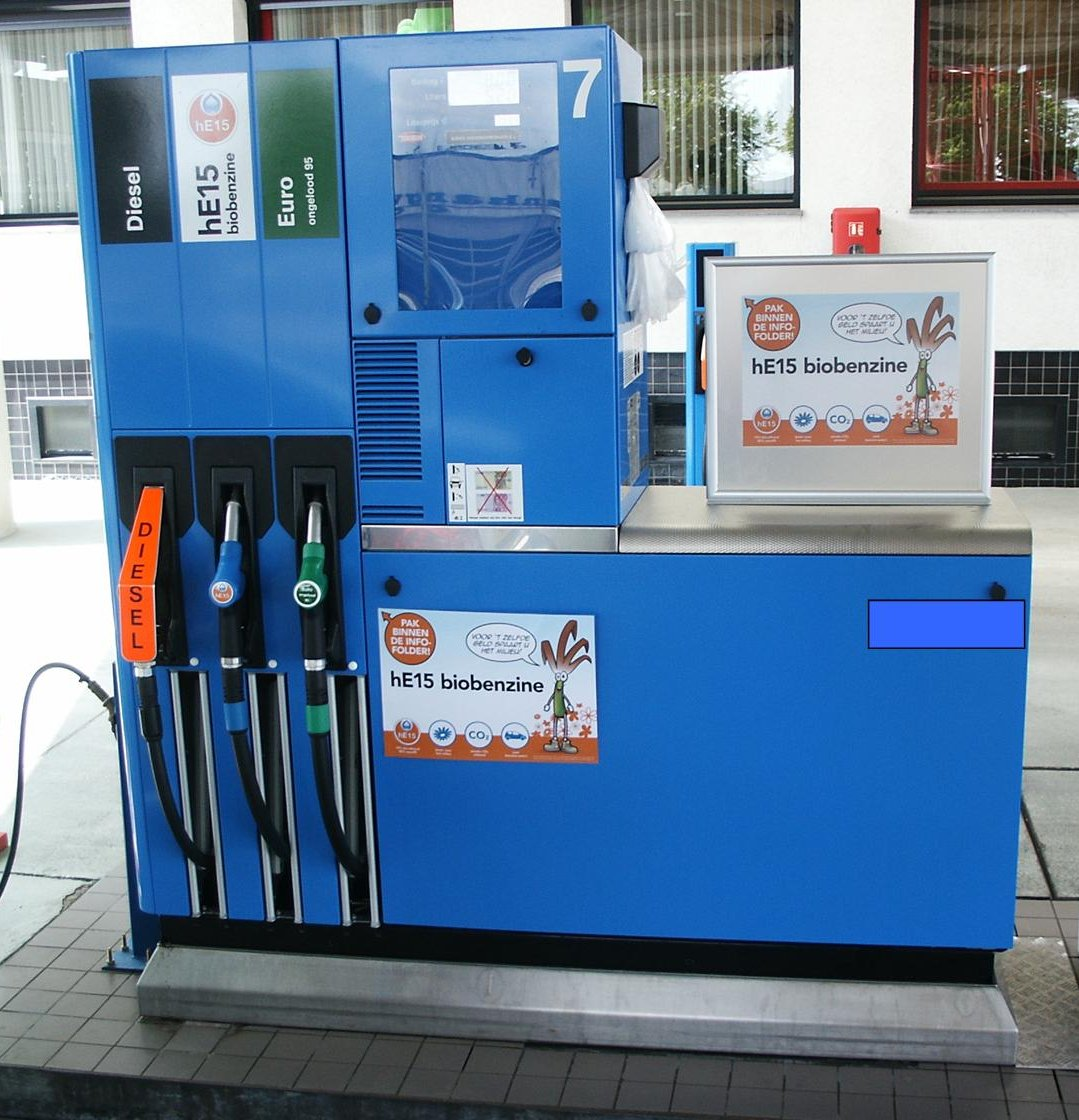
Example of public gas station with hE15 next to diesel and regular gasoline in the Netherlands.

A 15% hydrous ethanol and 85% gasoline blend, hE15, has been introduced at public gas stations in the Netherlands since 2008. Ethanol fuel specifications worldwide traditionally dictate use of anhydrous ethanol (less than 1% water) for gasoline blending. This results in additional costs, energy usage and environmental impacts associated with the extra processing step required to dehydrate the hydrous ethanol produced via distillation (3.5-4.9 vol.% water) to meet the current anhydrous ethanol specifications. A patented discovery reveals hydrous ethanol can be effectively used in most ethanol/gasoline blending applications.

According to the Brazilian Agência Nacional do Petróleo (ANP) specification, hydrous ethanol contains up to 4.9 vol.% water. In hE15, this would be up to 0.74 vol.% water in the overall mixture. Japanese and German scientific evidence revealed the water is an inhibitor for corrosion by ethanol.

The experiments show that water in fuel ethanol inhibits dry corrosion. At 10,000 ppm water in the E50 experiments by JARI and 3,500 ppm water in the E20 experiments by TU Darmstadt the alcoholate/alkoxide corrosion stopped. In the fuel ethanol this resembles 20,000 ppm or 2 volume% in the case of JARI and 5 x 3500 = 17,500 ppm of 1.75 volume% in the case of TU Darmstadt. The observations are in line with the fact that hydrous ethanol is known for being less corrosive than anhydrous ethanol. The reaction mechanism will be the same at lower-mid blends. When enough water is present in the fuel, the aluminum will react preferably with water to produce aluminum oxide, repairing the protective aluminum oxide layer, which is why the corrosion stops. The aluminum alcoholate/alkoxide does not make a tight oxide layer, which is why the corrosion continues. In other words, water is essential to repair the holes in the oxide layer. Based on the Japanese/German results, a minimum of 2 vol.% or 2.52% m/m water is currently proposed in the revision of the hydrous ethanol specification for blending in petrol at E10+ levels. Water injection has additional positive effects on the engine performance (thermodynamic efficiency) and reduces overall CO_{2} emissions.

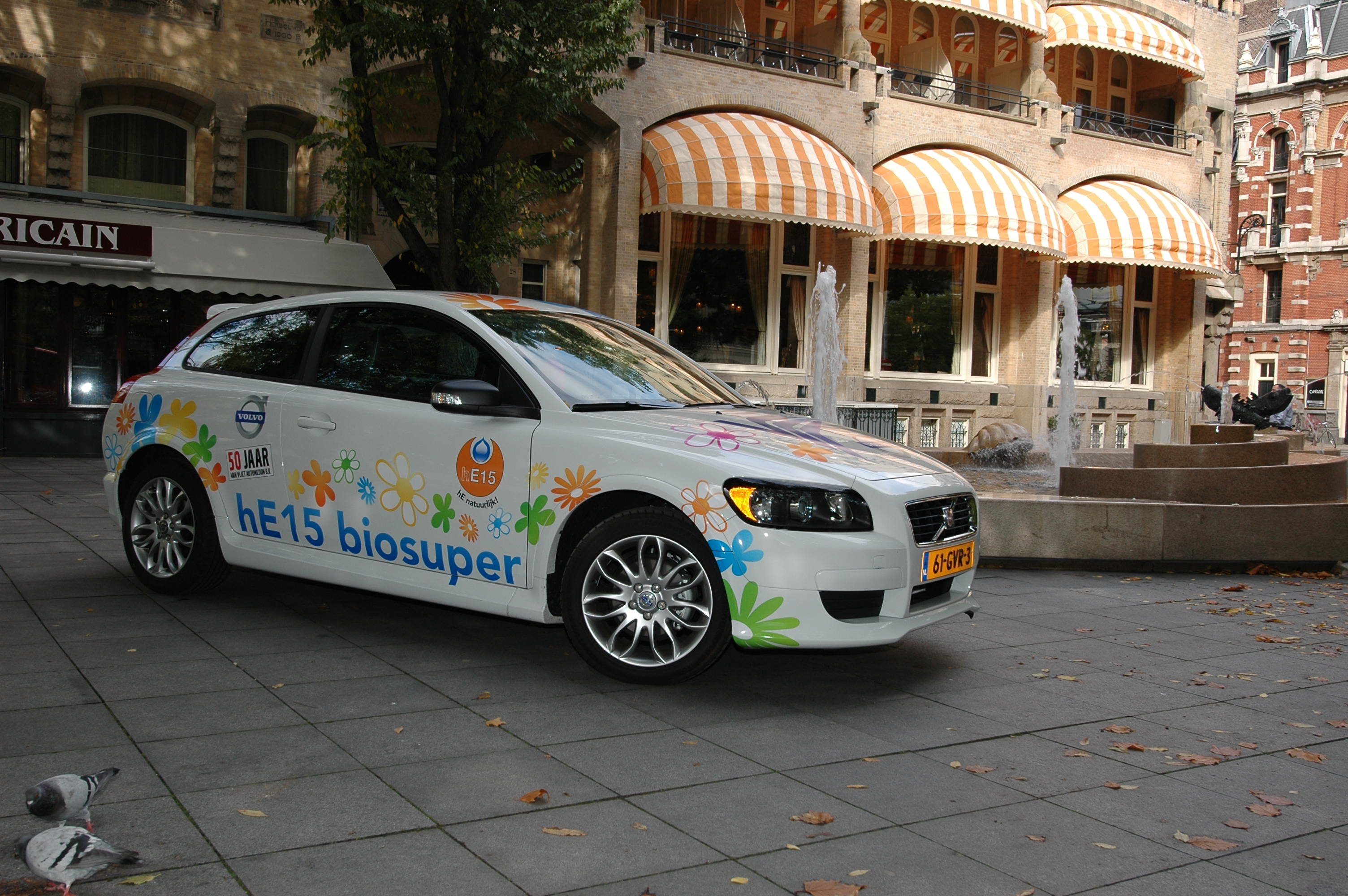
hE15 promotion Amsterdam

Overall, a transition from anhydrous to hydrous ethanol for gasoline blending is expected to make a significant contribution to ethanol's cost-competitiveness, fuel cycle net energy balance, air quality, and greenhouse gas emissions.

The level of blending above 10% (V/V) is chosen both from a technical (safety) perspective and to distinguish the product in Europe from regular unleaded petrol for reasons of taxes and customer clarity. Small-scale tests have shown many vehicles with modern engine types can run smoothly on this hydrous ethanol blend. Mixed tanking scenarios with anhydrous ethanol blends at 5% or 10% level do not induce phase separation. As avoiding mixing with E0, in particular at extremely low temperatures, in logistic systems and engines is not recommended, a separate specification for controlled usage is presented in a Netherlands Technical Agreement NTA 8115. The NTA 8115 is written for a worldwide application in trading and fuel blending.

== E20, E25 ==
Historical evolution of ethanol blends used in Brazil 1931–2015 (Selected years only)
Year	Ethanol blend	Year	Ethanol blend
1931	E5	2004	E20
1966	E25	2005	E22
1976	E11	2006	E20
1978	E18-20-23	2007	E23-25
1981	E20-12-20	2008	E25
1987-88	E22	2009	E25
1993-98	E22	2010	E20-25
2000	E20	2011	E18-E25
2001	E22	2015	E18-E27.5
2003	E20-25		
Source: 1937–2007, J.A. Puerto Rico (2007), Table 3.8, pp. 81–82; Note: The 2010 reduction from E25 to E20 was temporary and took place between February and April. The lower limit was reduced from 20% to 18% in April 2011.

E20 contains 20% ethanol and 80% gasoline, while E25 contains 25% ethanol. These blends have been widely used in Brazil since the late 1970s. As a response to the 1973 oil crisis, the Brazilian government made mandatory the blend of ethanol fuel with gasoline, fluctuating between 10% and 22% from 1976 until 1992. Due to this mandatory minimum gasoline blend, pure gasoline (E0) is no longer sold in Brazil. A federal law was passed in October 1993 establishing a mandatory blend of 22% anhydrous ethanol (E22) in the entire country. This law also authorized the Executive to set different percentages of ethanol within pre-established boundaries, and since 2003, these limits were fixed at a maximum of 25% (E25) and a minimum of 20% (E20) by volume. Since then, the government has set the percentage on the ethanol blend according to the results of the sugarcane harvest and ethanol production from sugarcane, resulting in blend variations even within the same year.

Since July 1, 2007, the mandatory blend was set at 25% of anhydrous ethanol (E25) by executive decree, and this has been the standard gasoline blend sold throughout Brazil most of the time as of 2011. However, as a result of a supply shortage and the resulting high ethanol fuel prices, in 2010, the government mandated a temporary 90-day blend reduction from E25 to E20 beginning February 1, 2010. As prices rose abruptly again due to supply shortages that took place again between the 2010 and 2011 harvest seasons, some ethanol had to be imported from the United States, and in April 2011, the government reduced the minimum mandatory blend to 18%, leaving the mandatory blend range between E18 and E25.

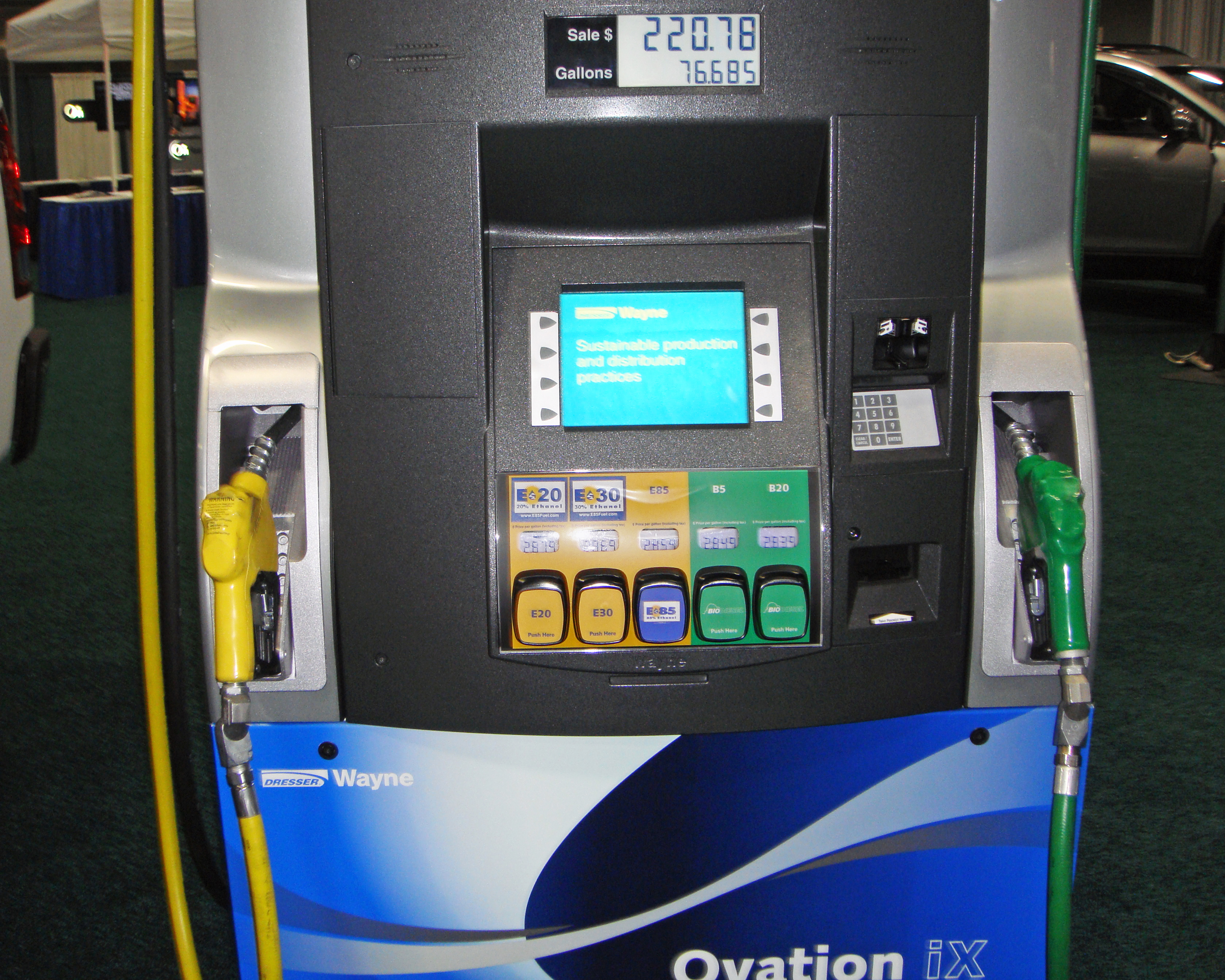
A blender pump is a multifuel blend dispenser that allows customers to choose between E20, E30, E85, or any other preselected blend.

All Brazilian automakers have adapted their gasoline engines to run smoothly with this range of mixtures, thus, all gasoline vehicles are built to run with blends from E20 to E25, defined by local law as "common gasoline type C". Some vehicles might work properly with lower concentrations of ethanol, but with a few exceptions, they are unable to run smoothly with pure gasoline, which causes engine knocking, as vehicles traveling to neighboring South American countries have demonstrated. Flex-fuel vehicles, which can run on any type of gasoline E20-E25 up to 100% hydrous ethanol (E100 or hydrated ethanol) ratios, were first available in mid-2003. In July 2008, 86% of all new light vehicles sold in Brazil were flexible-fuel, and only two carmakers build models with a flex-fuel engine optimized to operate with pure gasoline (E0): Renault with the models Clio, Symbol, Logan, Sandero and Mégane, and Fiat with the Siena Tetrafuel.

Thailand introduced E20 in 2008, but shortages in ethanol supplies by mid-2008 caused a delay in the expansion of the E20 fueling station network in the country. By mid-2010, 161 fueling stations were selling E20, and sales had risen 80% since April 2009. The rapid growth in E20 demand is because most vehicle models launched since 2009 were E20-compatible, and sales of E20 are expected to grow faster once more local automakers start producing small, E20-compatible, fuel-efficient cars. The Thai government is promoting ethanol usage through subsidies, as ethanol costs four baht (about 12 US cents) a litre more than gasoline.

A state law approved in Minnesota in 2005 mandated that ethanol comprise 20% of all gasoline sold in this American state beginning in 2013. Successful tests have been conducted to determine the performance under E20 by current vehicles and fuel dispensing equipment designed for E10. However, this mandate was later delayed to 2015, and has never taken effect because the federal EPA has yet to authorize the use of E20 as a replacement for gasoline.

A study commissioned by BP and published in September 2013, concluded that the use of advanced biofuels in the UK, and particularly E20 cellulosic ethanol, is a more cost-effective way of reducing emissions than using plug-in electric vehicles (PEVs) in the timeframe to 2030. The study also found that the use of higher blends of biofuels is complementary to hybrid electric vehicles (HEVs) and plug-in hybrids (PHEVs). Battery electric vehicles (BEVs) can deliver strong CO_{2} savings with a decarbonised electric grid, but are expected to have significantly higher costs than internal combustion engine vehicles and hybrid cars to 2030, as the latter are expected to be the most popular models by 2030. According to the study, in 2030 an E20 blend in an HEV can achieve a 10% emission savings compared to an HEV running on E5, for an annual fuel cost premium of £13 compared to an annual cost of £195 for an all-electric car.

India shifted toward E20 petrol as a part of the Ethanol Blended Petrol (EBP) Programme, which started at 8.1% ethanol and expanded over time through earlier blending stages before reaching the desired share in 2025-26. The programme was closely tied to ethanol availability and agricultural feedstock policy, so rollout followed supply readiness rather than nationwide consumer choice.

The Government of India argued that India's petrol retail system depends on a large, integrated network of refineries, terminals, and pipelines, so running separate nationwide base fuels (pure petrol, E10, and E20) would have raised costs and complicated quality control at each outlet. It further maintained that backing away from E20 quickly could have stranded ethanol infrastructure investments and harmed farmers and entrepreneurs who had built it.

However, this fast shift to E20 petrol has triggered anger and confusion among vehicle owners. Many drivers say that their cars feel less responsive and get worse fuel economy after switching to E20, with reports of mileage falling by roughly 10% or more. Additionally some mechanics argue that ethanol's lower energy content can reduce mileage and that long-term wear could affect rubber and fuel-system components in vehicles not originally designed for higher blends, while the government citing research including work by ARAI and the Indian Institute of Petroleum says claims of harm are largely unsupported and that any efficiency reduction for compatible vehicles is marginal. Recently, India has faced several issues in implementing E20, with several groups and political parties deliberately opposing such policies.

In 2026, reports of chloride and moisture contamination in some E20 petrol samples prompted concerns among automobile manufacturers and calls for stronger fuel-quality monitoring in India. Subsequent nationwide testing by oil marketing companies reported that E20 fuel supplied through their network was generally within prescribed quality limits.

== E70, E75 ==
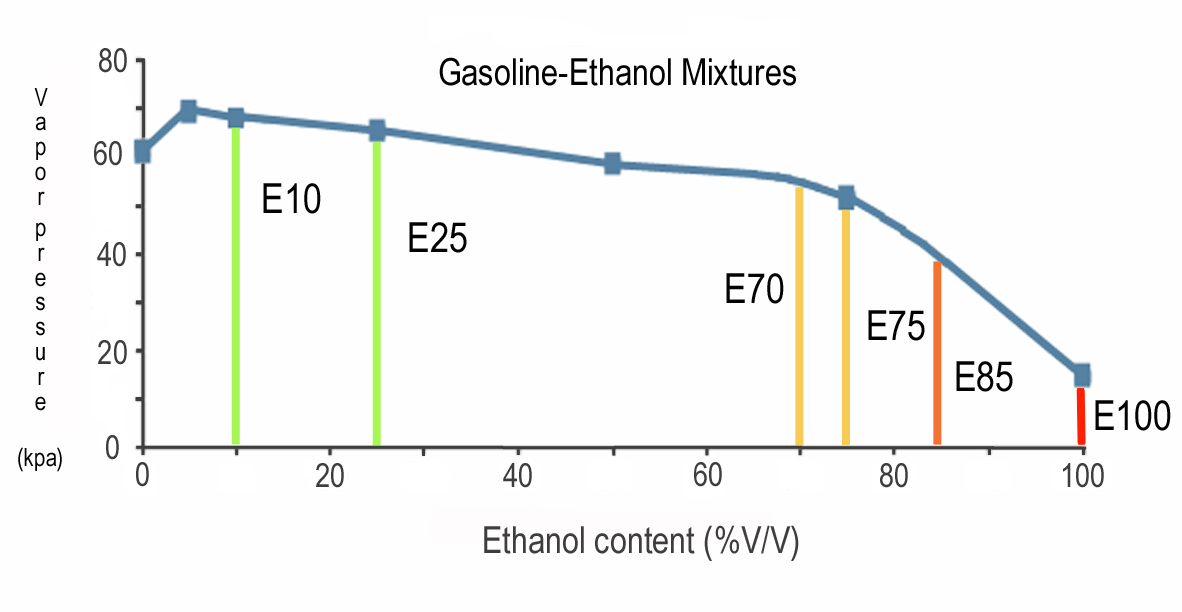
When the vapor pressure in the ethanol blend drops below 45 kPa, fuel ignition cannot be guaranteed on cold winter days, limiting the maximum ethanol blend percentage during the winter months to E75.

E70 contains 70% ethanol and 30% gasoline, while E75 contains 75% ethanol. These winter blends are used in the United States and Sweden for E85 flexible-fuel vehicles during the cold weather, but still sold at the pump labeled as E85. The seasonal reduction of the ethanol content to an E85 winter blend is mandated to avoid cold starting problems at low temperatures.

In the US, this seasonal reduction of the ethanol content to E70 applies only in cold regions, where temperatures fall below 32 °F (0 °C) during the winter. In Wyoming for example, E70 is sold as E85 from October to May. In Sweden, all E85 flexible-fuel vehicles use an E75 winter blend. This blend was introduced since the winter 2006-07 and E75 is used from November until March.

For temperatures below −15 °C (5 °F), all E85 flex vehicles require an engine block heater to avoid cold starting problems. The use of this device is also recommended for gasoline vehicles when temperatures drop below −23 °C (−9 °F). Another option when extreme cold weather is expected is to add more pure gasoline in the tank, thus reducing the ethanol content below the E70 winter blend, or simply not to use E85 during extreme low temperature spells.

== E85 ==
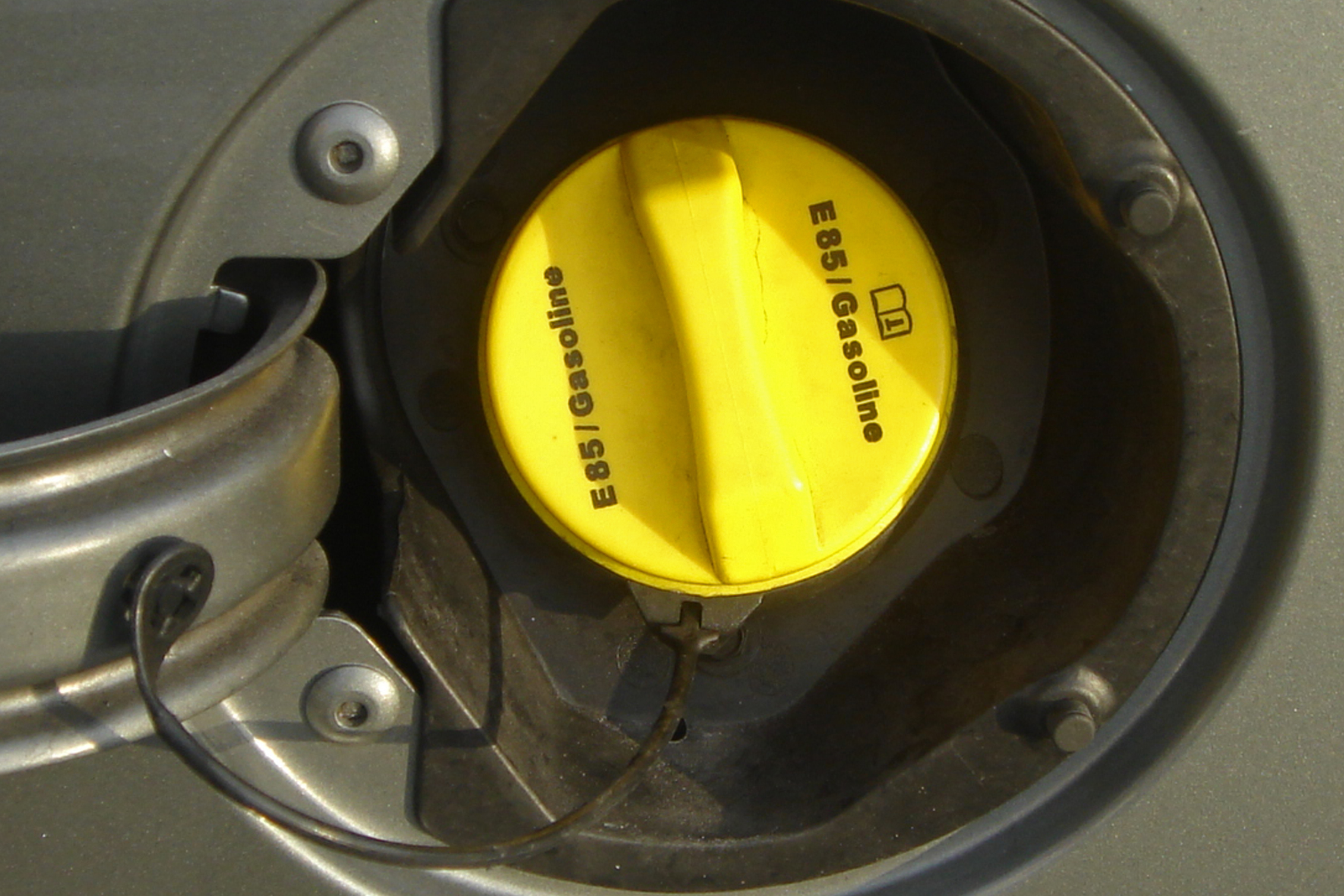
Typical yellow cap used for the fuel filler cap of U.S. vehicles built to use the E85 blend

E85, a mixture of 85% ethanol and ~15% gasoline, is generally the highest ethanol fuel mixture found in the United States and several European countries, particularly in Sweden, as this blend is the standard fuel for flexible-fuel vehicles. This mixture has an octane rating of 108, however, the Ethanol molecule also carries with it an oxygen atom, where-as gasoline does not, effectively requiring the internal combustion engine to ingest less air per unit-volume by its own accord, which reduces pumping losses, and further increases the exo-thermic chemical reaction. Ethanol fuel is considered – although not widely known as – a form of "chemical supercharging", similar to that of nitrous oxide (N_{2}O) and nitromethane (CH_{3}NO_{2}).

Logo used in the United States for E85 fuel

The 85% limit in the ethanol content was set to reduce ethanol emissions at low temperatures and to avoid cold starting problems during cold weather, at temperatures lower than 11 °C (52 °F). A further reduction in the ethanol content is used during the winter in regions where temperatures fall below 0 °C (32 °F) and this blend is called Winter E85, as the fuel is still sold under the E85 label. A winter blend of E70 is mandated in some regions in the US, while Sweden mandates E75. Some regions in the United States now allow E51 (51% ethanol, 49% gasoline) to be sold as E85 in the winter months.

As of October 2010, nearly 3,000 E85 fuel pumps were in Europe, led by Sweden with 1,699 filling stations. The United States had 3,354 public E85 fuel pumps located in 2,154 cities by August 2014, mostly concentrated in the Midwest.

Thailand introduced E85 fuel by the end of 2008, and by mid-2010, only four E85 filling stations were available, with plans to expand to 15 stations by 2012.

A major restriction hampering sales of E85 flex vehicles or fuelling with E85, is the limited infrastructure available to sell E85 to the public, as by 2014 only 2 percent of motor fuel stations offered E85, up from about 1 percent in 2011. As of November 2015, there were only 3,218 gasoline fueling stations selling E85 to the public in the entire U.S., while about 156,000 retail motor fuel outlets do not offer the E85 blend. The number of E85 grew from 1,229 in 2007 to 2,442 in 2011, but only increased by 7% from 2011 to 2013, when the total reached 2,625. There is a great concentration of E85 stations in the Corn Belt states, and as of November 2015, the leading state is Minnesota with 274 stations, followed by Michigan with 231, Illinois with 225, Iowa with 204, Indiana with 188, Texas with 181, Wisconsin with 152, and Ohio with 126. Only eight states do not have E85 available to the public, Alaska, Delaware, Hawaii, Montana, Maine, New Hampshire, Rhode Island, and Vermont. The main constraint for a more rapid expansion of E85 availability is that it requires dedicated storage tanks at filling stations, at an estimated cost of US$60,000 for each dedicated ethanol tank. A study conducted by the U.S. Department of Energy concluded that every service station in America could be converted to handle E85 at a cost of $3.4 billion to $10.1 billion.

== ED95 ==
ED95 designates a blend of 95% ethanol and 5% ignition improver; it is used in modified diesel engines where high compression is used to ignite the fuel, as opposed to the operation of gasoline engines, where spark plugs are used. This fuel was developed by Swedish ethanol producer SEKAB. Because of the high ignition temperatures of pure ethanol, the addition of ignition improver is necessary for successful diesel engine operation. A diesel engine running on ethanol also has a higher compression ratio and an adapted fuel system.

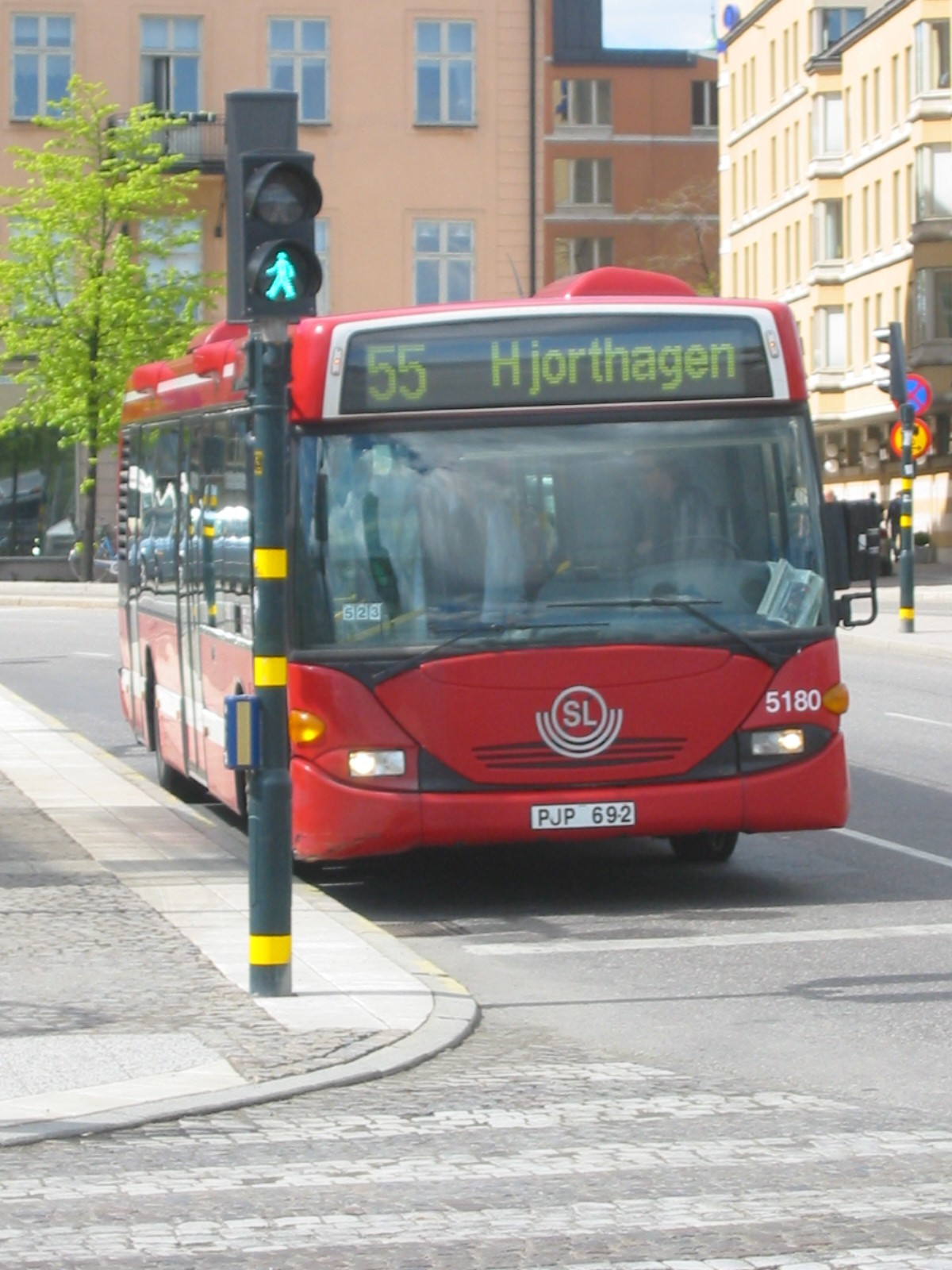
ED95 bus in Sweden running on a modified diesel engine

This fuel has been used with success in many Swedish Scania buses since 1985, which has produced around 700 ethanol buses, more than 600 of them to Swedish cities, and more recently has also delivered ethanol buses for commercial service in Great Britain, Spain, Italy, Belgium, and Norway. As of June 2010 Stockholm has the largest ethanol ED95 bus fleet in the world.

As of 2010, the Swedish ED95 engine is in its third generation and already has complied with Euro 5 emission standards, without any kind of post-treatment of the exhaust gases. The ethanol-powered engine is also being certified as environmentally enhanced vehicle (EEV) in the Stockholm municipality. The EEV rule still has no date to enter into force in Europe and is stricter than the Euro 5 standard.

Nottingham became the first city in England to operate a regular bus service with ethanol-fuelled vehicles. Three ED95 single-deck buses entered regular service in the city in March 2008. Soon after, Reading also introduced ED95 double-deck buses.

Under the auspices of the BioEthanol for Sustainable Transport project, more than 138 bioethanol ED95 buses were part of demonstration trial at four cities, three in Europe, and one in Brazil, between 2006 and 2009. A total of 127 ED95 buses operated in Stockholm, five buses operated in Madrid, three in La Spezia, and one in Brazil. In Brazil, the first Scania ED95 bus with a modified diesel engine was introduced as a trial in São Paulo city in December 2007, and since November 2009, two ED95 buses were in regular service. The Brazilian trial project ran for three years and performance and emissions were monitored by the National Reference Center on Biomass (CENBIO- Portuguese: Centro Nacional de Referência em Biomassa) at the Universidade de São Paulo.

In November 2010, the municipal government of São Paulo city signed an agreement with UNICA, Cosan, Scania and Viação Metropolitana, a local bus operator, to introduced a fleet of 50 ethanol-powered ED95 buses by May 2011. Scania manufactures the bus engine and chassis in its plant located in São Bernardo do Campo, São Paulo, using the same technology and fuel as the ED95 buses already operating in Stockholm. The bus body is a Brazilian CAIO. The first ethanol-powered buses were delivered in May 2011, and the 50 buses will start regular service in June 2011 in the southern region of São Paulo. The 50 ED95 buses had a cost of R$ 20 million (US$12.3 million) and due to the higher cost of the ED95 fuel and the lower energy content of ethanol as compared to diesel, one of the firms participating in the cooperation agreement, Raísen (a joint venture between Royal Dutch Shell and Cosan), supplies the fuel to the municipality at 70% of the market price of regular diesel.

== E100 ==
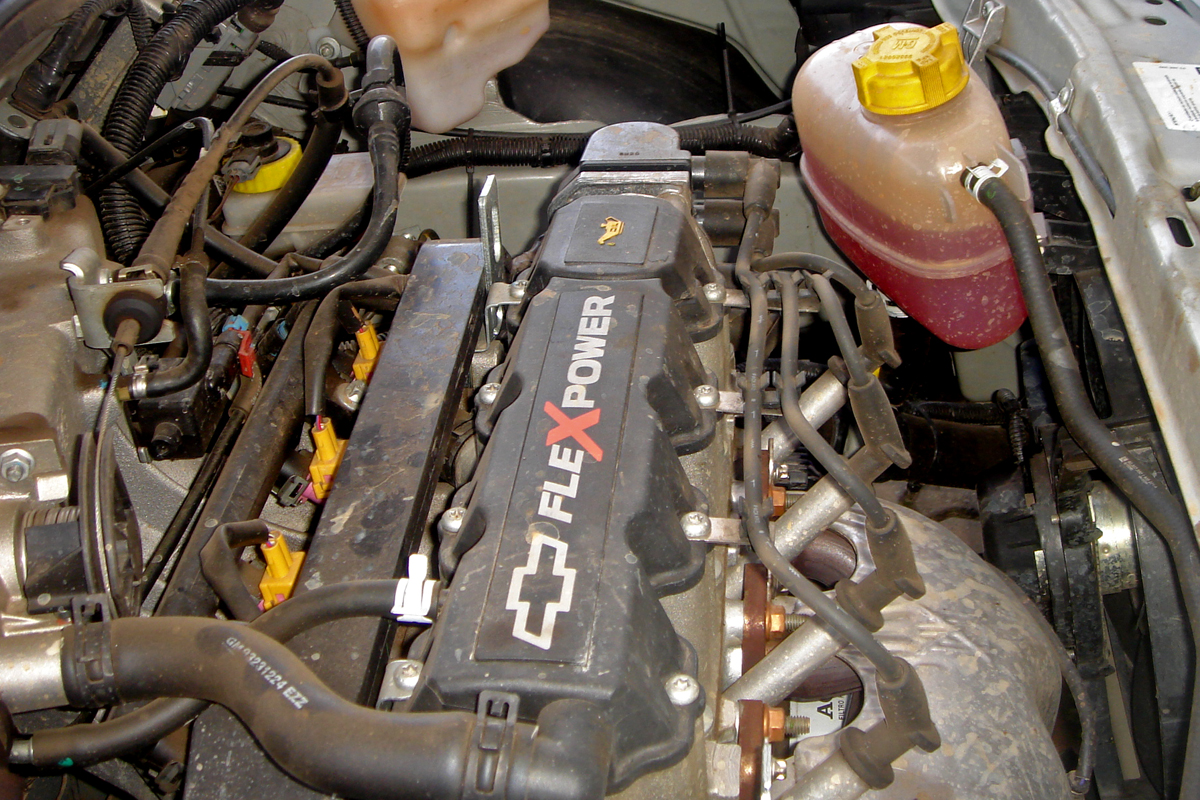
Typical Brazilian flexible-fuel engine with secondary gasoline reservoir for cold starting the engine at temperatures below 15 °C (59 °F)

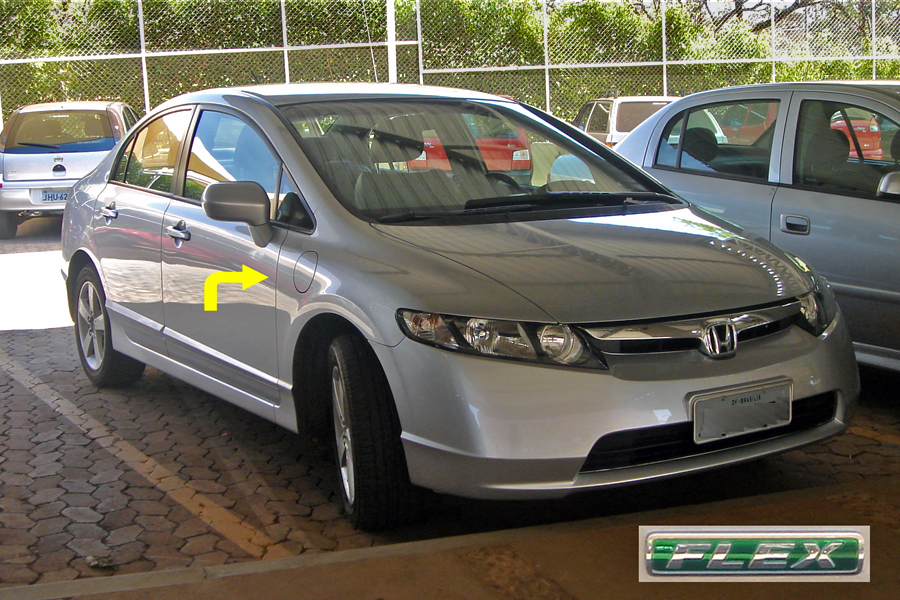
The Brazilian 2008 Honda Civic flex-fuel has outside access to the secondary reservoir gasoline tank in the front right side shown by the arrow.

E100 is pure ethanol fuel. Straight hydrous ethanol as an automotive fuel has been widely used in Brazil since the late 1970s for neat ethanol vehicles and more recently for flexible-fuel vehicles. The ethanol fuel used in Brazil is distilled close to the azeotrope mixture of 95.63% ethanol and 4.37% water (by weight) which is approximately 3.5% water by volume. The azeotrope is the highest concentration of ethanol that can be achieved by simple fractional distillation. The maximum water concentration according to the Agência Nacional do Petróleo (ANP) specification is 4.9 vol.% (approximately 6.1 weight%) The E nomenclature is not adopted in Brazil, but hydrated ethanol can be tagged as E100, meaning it does not have any gasoline, because the water content is not an additive, but rather a residue from the distillation process. However, straight hydrous ethanol is also called E95 by some authors.

The first commercial vehicle capable of running on pure ethanol was the Ford Model T, produced from 1908 through 1927. It was fitted with a carburetor with adjustable jetting, allowing use of gasoline or ethanol, or a combination of both. At that time, other car manufacturers also provided engines for ethanol fuel use. Thereafter, and as a response to the 1973 and 1979 energy crises, the first modern vehicle capable of running with pure hydrous ethanol (E100) was launched in the Brazilian market, the Fiat 147, after testing with several prototypes developed by the Brazilian subsidiaries of Fiat, Volkswagen, General Motors and Ford. As of September 2012, there were 1.1 million neat ethanol vehicles still in use in Brazil. Since 2003, Brazilian newer flex-fuel vehicles are capable of running on pure hydrous ethanol (E100) or blended with any combination of E20 to E27.5 gasoline (a mixture made with anhydrous ethanol), the national mandatory blend. As of September 2012, there were 17.1 million flexible-fuel vehicles running on Brazilian roads.

E100 imposes a limitation on normal vehicle operation, as ethanol's lower evaporative pressure (as compared to gasoline) causes problems when cold starting the engine at temperatures below 15 °C (59 °F). For this reason, both pure ethanol and E100 flex-fuel vehicles are built with an additional small gasoline reservoir inside the engine compartment to help in starting the engine when cold by initially injecting gasoline. Once started, the engine is then switched back to ethanol. An improved flex-fuel engine generation was developed to eliminate the need for the secondary gas tank by warming the ethanol fuel during starting, and allowing them to start at temperatures as low as −5 °C (23 °F), the lowest temperature expected anywhere in the Brazilian territory. The Polo E-Flex, launched in March 2009, was the first flex-fuel model without an auxiliary tank for cold start. The warming system, called Flex Start, was developed by Robert Bosch GmbH.

Swedish carmakers have developed ethanol-only capable engines for the new Saab Aero X BioPower 100 Concept E100, with a V6 engine which is fuelled entirely by E100 bioethanol, and the limited edition of the Koenigsegg CCXR, a version of the CCX converted to use E85 or E100, as well as standard 98-octane gasoline, and currently the fastest and most powerful flex-fuel vehicle with its twin-supercharged V8 producing 1018 hp when running on biofuel, as compared to 806 hp on 91-octane unleaded gasoline.

The higher fuel efficiency of E100 (compared to methanol) in high performance race cars resulted in Indianapolis 500 races in 2007 and 2008 being run on 100% fuel-grade ethanol.

== Use limitations ==
=== Modifications to engines ===
The use of ethanol blends in conventional gasoline vehicles is restricted to low mixtures, as ethanol-gasoline is corrosive and can degrade some of the materials in the engine and fuel system. Also, the engine has to be adjusted for a higher compression ratio as compared to a pure gasoline engine to take advantage of ethanol's higher oxygen content, thus allowing an improvement in fuel efficiency and a reduction of tailpipe emissions. The following table shows the required modifications to gasoline engines to run smoothly and without degrading any materials. This information is based on the modifications made by the Brazilian automotive industry at the beginning of the ethanol program in that country in the late 1970s, and reflects the experience of Volkswagen do Brasil.

Required adjustments to gasoline engines to cope with different blends of ethanol fuel
Ethanol blend	Carburetor	Fuel Injection	Fuel pump	Fuel pressure device	Fuel filter	Ignition system	Evaporative system	Fuel tank	Catalytic converter	Basic engine	Motor oil	Intake manifold	Exhaust system	Cold start system
≤ 5%	Modifications not necessary for any vehicle													
E5 to E10		Modifications not necessary for vehicles since about 1987-92												
E10 to E30	Specially designed vehicles													
E30 to E85	Specially designed vehicles													
E85 to E100	Specially designed vehicles													
			Modifications not necessary						Modifications probably necessary					

Disadvantages to ethanol fuel blends when used in engines designed exclusively for gasoline include lowered fuel mileage, metal corrosion, deterioration of plastic and rubber fuel system components, clogged fuel systems, fuel injectors, and carburetors, delamination of composite fuel tanks, varnish buildup on engine parts, damaged or destroyed internal engine components, water absorption, fuel phase separation, and shortened fuel storage life. Many major auto, marine, motorcycle, lawn equipment, generator, and other internal combustion engine manufacturers have issued warnings and precautions about the use of ethanol-blended gasolines of any type in their engines, and the Federal Aviation Administration and major aviation engine manufacturers have prohibited the use of automotive gasolines blended with ethanol in light aircraft due to safety issues from fuel system and engine damage.

=== Other disadvantages ===
Combustion of ethanol gives some acetaldehyde, which is an irritant. Ethanol is not miscible with gasoline at low temperatures, e.g. in cold regions of the planet. It is also leads to deposits.

== See also ==
- Butanol fuel
- Ethanol fuel
- Ethanol fuel energy balance
- Ethanol fuel in Brazil
- Biofuel in Sweden
- Ethanol fuel in the United States
- Food vs. fuel
- Indirect land use change impacts of biofuels
- List of flexible-fuel vehicles by car manufacturer
- List of gasoline additives
