= Tadeusz Patzek =

Polish-American chemical engineer and physicist

Tad Patzek
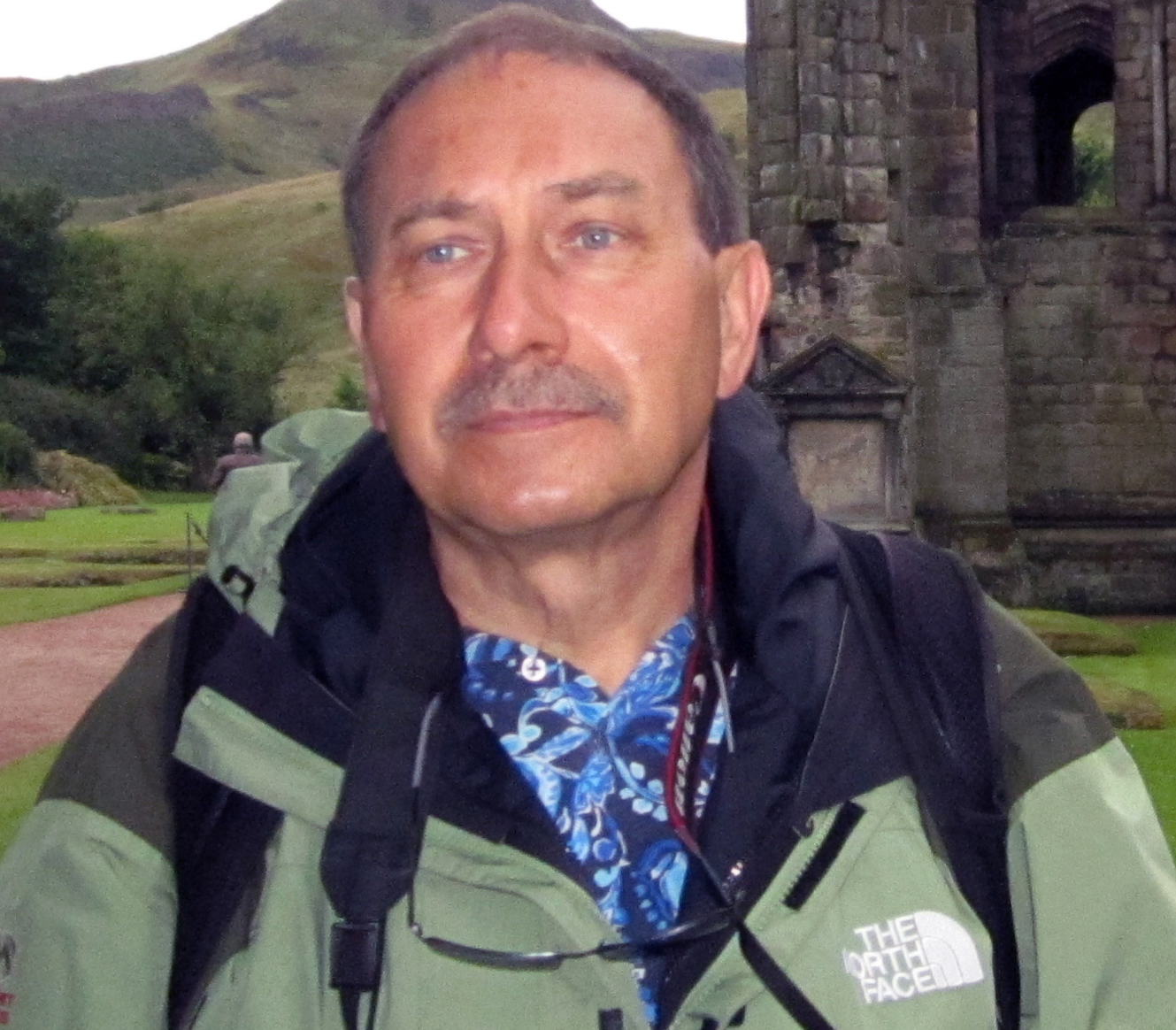
- Patzek, 2018
- Born: Gliwice, Poland
- Occupations: Educator and petroleum engineer
- Known for: Education, modeling of fluid flow in porous media, environmental activism
- Website: patzek-lifeitself.blogspot.com

Tadeusz "Tad" W. Patzek is a Polish-American chemical engineer and physicist.

== Education ==
Patzek was born in Gliwice, Poland, on 26 November 1951. Between 1969 and 1974, he studied chemical process engineering at the Department of Chemistry of The Silesian Technical University in Gliwice. In parallel, Patzek studied applied physics at the Department of Mathematics and Physics. After obtaining an MS degree in chemical engineering, Patzek started PhD work at the Chemical Engineering Center of the Polish Academy of Sciences in Gliwice. As a PhD student, Patzek won a Fulbright Scholarship to the US, and enrolled for the 1978/79 academic year at the Department of Chemical Engineering & Materials Science of the University of Minnesota.

== Professional career ==
Tad Patzek is a professor and petroleum industry analyst at King Abdullah University of Science and Technology (KAUST) in Thuwal, Saudi Arabia.

Until December 2014, he was the Lois K. and Richard D. Folger Leadership Professor and Chairman of the Department of Petroleum and Geosystems Engineering at the University of Texas at Austin. He also held the Cockrell Family Regents Chair. Between 1990 and 2008, Patzek was a Professor of Geoengineering at the University of California, Berkeley. Patzek is also a Presidential Full Professor in Poland.

Patzek briefed Congress on the BP Deepwater Horizon well disaster in the Gulf, and was a frequent guest on NPR, ABC, BBC, CNN, and CBS. In January 2011, Patzek became a member of the Ocean Energy Safety Advisory Committee for the United States Department of Interior's Bureau of Safety and Environmental Enforcement (BSEE). He co‐wrote a popular book with historian Joseph Tainter, Drilling Down: The Gulf Debacle and our Energy Dilemma.

Since 2003, Patzek has engaged in the study of sustainability and industrial agricultural and agrofuel systems, all viewed through the lens of ecology and thermodynamics. In 2007, Patzek participated in the OECD ministerial meetings in Paris that coped with the new biofuel mandates established in the US.

One of the focal points of Patzek's research has been an effort to obtain realistic assessments of oil, gas, and coal production. This work includes new forms of Decline curve analysis, making predictions for the next several decades of production from gas shales.

Patzek has coauthored some 300 papers and reports.

== Awards ==
Patzek, Frank Male, and Michael Marder received the 2013 Cozzarelli Prize from the National Academy of Sciences for the best paper, "Gas production in the Barnett Shale obeys a simple scaling law", in the engineering and applied sciences category.
