= Ethanol fuel energy balance =

Energy balance (2007)
Country	Type	Energy balance
United States	Corn ethanol	1.3
Brazil	Sugarcane ethanol	8
Germany	Biodiesel	2.5
United States	Cellulosic ethanol	†2–36

† depending on production method

In order to create ethanol, all biomass needs to go through some of these steps: it needs to be grown, collected, dried, fermented, and burned. All of these steps require resources and an infrastructure. The ratio of the energy released by burning the resulting ethanol fuel to the energy used in the process, is known as the ethanol fuel energy balance (sometimes called "Net energy gain") and studied as part of the wider field of energy economics. Figures compiled in a 2007 National Geographic Magazine article point to modest results for corn (maize) ethanol produced in the US: 1 unit of energy input equals 1.3 energy units of corn ethanol energy. The energy balance for sugarcane ethanol produced in Brazil is much more favorable, 1 to 8. Over the years, however, many reports have been produced with contradicting energy balance estimates. A 2006 University of California Berkeley study, after analyzing six separate studies, concluded that producing ethanol from corn uses marginally less petroleum than producing gasoline.

== Energy balance reports ==
In 1995 the USDA released a report stating that the net energy balance of corn ethanol in the United States was an average of 1.24. It was previously considered to have a negative net energy balance. However, due to increases in corn crop yield and more efficient farming practices corn ethanol had gained energy efficiency.

Ken Cassman, a professor of agronomy at the University of Nebraska–Lincoln, said in 2008 that ethanol has a substantial net positive direct energy balance: 1.5 to 1.6 more units of energy are derived from ethanol than are used to produce it. Comparing 2008 to 2003, Alan Tiemann of Seward, a Nebraska Corn Board member, said that ethanol plants produce 15 percent more ethanol from a bushel of corn and use about 20 percent less energy in the process. At the same time, corn growers are more efficient, producing more corn per acre and using less energy to do so.

Opponents of corn ethanol production in the U.S. often quote the 2005 paper of David Pimentel, a retired Entomologist, and Tadeusz Patzek, a Geological Engineer from UC Berkeley. Both have been exceptionally critical of ethanol and other biofuels. Their studies contend that ethanol, and biofuels in general, are "energy negative", meaning they take more energy to produce than is contained in the final product.

A 2006 article in Science offers the consensus opinion that current corn ethanol technologies had similar greenhouse gas emissions to gasoline, but was much less petroleum-intensive than gasoline. Fossil fuels also require significant energy inputs which have seldom been accounted for in the past.

Ethanol is not the only product created during production. By-products also have energy content. Corn is typically 66% starch and the remaining 33% is not fermented. This unfermented component is called distillers grain, which is high in fats and proteins, and makes a good animal feed supplement.

In 2000, Dr. Michael Wang, of Argonne National Laboratory, wrote that these ethanol by-products are the most contentious issue in evaluating the energy balance of ethanol. He wrote that Pimentel assumes that corn ethanol entirely replaces gasoline and so the quantity of by-products is too large for the market to absorb, and they become waste. At lower quantities of production, Wang finds it appropriate to credit corn ethanol based on the input energy requirement of the feed product or good that the ethanol by-product displaces. In 2004, a USDA report found that co-products accounting made the difference between energy ratios of 1.06 and 1.67. In 2006, MIT researcher Tiffany Groode came to similar conclusions about the co-product issue.

In Brazil where sugar cane is used, the yield is higher, and conversion to ethanol is more energy efficient than corn. Recent developments with cellulosic ethanol production may improve yields even further.

In 2006 a study from the University of Minnesota found that corn-grain ethanol produced 1.25 units of energy per unit put in.

A 2008 study by the University of Nebraska–Lincoln found a 5.4 energy balance for ethanol derived specifically from switchgrass. This estimate is better than in previous studies and according to the authors partly due to the larger size of the field trial (3-9 ha) on 10 farms.

== Variables ==
According to DoE, to evaluate the net energy of ethanol four variables must be considered:

1. the amount of energy contained in the final ethanol product
2. the amount of energy directly consumed to make the ethanol (such as the diesel used in tractors)
3. the quality of the resulting ethanol compared to the quality of refined gasoline
4. the energy indirectly consumed (in order to make the ethanol processing plant, etc.).

Much of the current academic discussion regarding ethanol currently revolves around issues of system borders. This refers to how complete a picture is drawn for energy inputs. There is debate on whether to include items like the energy required to feed the people tending and processing the corn, to erect and repair farm fences, even the amount of energy a tractor represents.

In addition, there is no consensus on what sort of value to give the rest of the corn (such as the stalk), commonly known as the 'coproduct.' Some studies leave it on the field to protect the soil from erosion and to add organic matter, while others take and burn the coproduct to power the ethanol plant, but do not address the resulting soil erosion (which would require energy in the form of fertilizer to replace). Depending on the ethanol study you read, net energy returns vary from .7-1.5 units of ethanol per unit of fossil fuel energy consumed. For comparison, that same one unit of fossil fuel invested in oil and gas extraction (in the lower 48 States) will yield 15 units of gasoline, a yield an order of magnitude better than current ethanol production technologies, ignoring the energy quality arguments above and the fact that the gain (14 units) is both declining and not carbon neutral.

In this regard, geography is the decisive factor. In tropical regions with abundant water and land resources, such as Brazil and Colombia, the viability of production of ethanol from sugarcane is no longer in question; in fact, the burning of sugar-cane residues (bagasse) generates far more energy than needed to operate the ethanol plants, and many of them are now selling electric energy to the utilities. However, while there may be a positive net energy return at the moment, recent research suggests that the sugarcane plantations are not sustainable in the long run, as they are depleting the soil of nutrients and carbon matter On the other hand, productivity of sugar cane per land area in Brazil has consistently grown over the decades; sugar cane has been shown to be less depleting to the soil than cattle and yearly cultures; and there are many regions in the country where sugar cane has been cultivated for centuries. Those facts suggest that related soil depletion processes are very slow and therefore ethanol from sugar cane may be far more sustainable in the long run than common fossil fuel alternatives. Besides, since the energy surplus is high in the case of sugar-cane ethanol, conceivably part of that energy can be used to synthesize fertilizers and replenish soil depletion over a long time, therefore making the process indefinitely sustainable.

The picture is different for other regions, such as most of the United States, where the climate is too cool for sugar cane. In the U.S., agricultural ethanol is generally obtained from grain, chiefly corn. But it can also be obtained from cellulose, a more energy balanced bioethanol.

== Clean production bioethanol ==
Clean production bioethanol is a biofuel obtained by maximizing non-greenhouse gas emitting (renewable) resources:

- energy directly consumed to make the ethanol is renewable energy. The farm equipment and ethanol plant use an ethanol engine, biodiesel, air engine or electricity cogenerated during ethanol production, or even wind power and solar energy.
- energy indirectly consumed is, as much as possible, renewable. Examples would be reducing either the amount or fossil carbon content of applied pest control chemicals and fertilizers, or accomplishing deliveries of farm inputs or of finished bioethanol fuel to market that minimize the use of fossil fuels. Optimally located biomass and ethanol production must balance many factors: minimizing distances to and from markets, effectively collecting and employing biomass wastes, maximizing crop yields based on enduring soil quality, available natural pest control and adequate sun and water, and optimizing a sufficient mix and rotation of plant species on cultivated, fallow, and preserved land for human, animal, and energy consumption.

Using ethanol returns carbon to the atmosphere whereas burning gasoline adds carbon to the atmosphere. Thus the effects of gasoline burning increase over time.

== See also ==
- Biobutanol
- Energy returned on energy invested
- Starch
