= Kasinski =

Brazilian motorcycle and scooter manufacturer

- Industry: Motorcycle manufacturing
- Founded: 1999; 27 years ago
- Founder: Abraham Kasinsky
- Defunct: 2014; 12 years ago
- Headquarters: São Paulo, Brazil
- Parent: CR Zongshen (2009-2014)

Kasinski was a Brazilian manufacturer of two- and three-wheeled vehicles, such as motorcycles, scooters and mopeds. It was established in 1999 by Abraham Kasinsky and sold in 2009 to the CR Zongshen group, a Sino-Brazilian group controlled by Zongshen.

== History ==
The company was started with the purchase of the industrial facilities of the Korean assembler Hyosung, an operation that included the rights to continue manufacturing its line of motorcycles, under the brand name Kasinski. In parallel with the motorcycles, the company would also assemble cargo tricycles with technology from India's Bajaj Auto.

In 2002 with a range of ten motorcycle models, with an average nationalization index of 65%. Despite good sales, production did not grow beyond 600 units per month. The tricycles that were initially expected to produce 1,500 units a month never became a reality, sales remained at unsatisfactory levels, and by 2007 the vehicles were no longer being produced.

Abraham Kasinsky sold the company, passing it on in July 2009. In 2010 the company announced the construction of a new factory in Sapucaia, Rio de Janeiro, where it would produce electric motorcycles. Amidst legal and labor problems, production was suspended in 2013. Since 2014 Kasinski no longer operates in Brazil.

== Past models ==
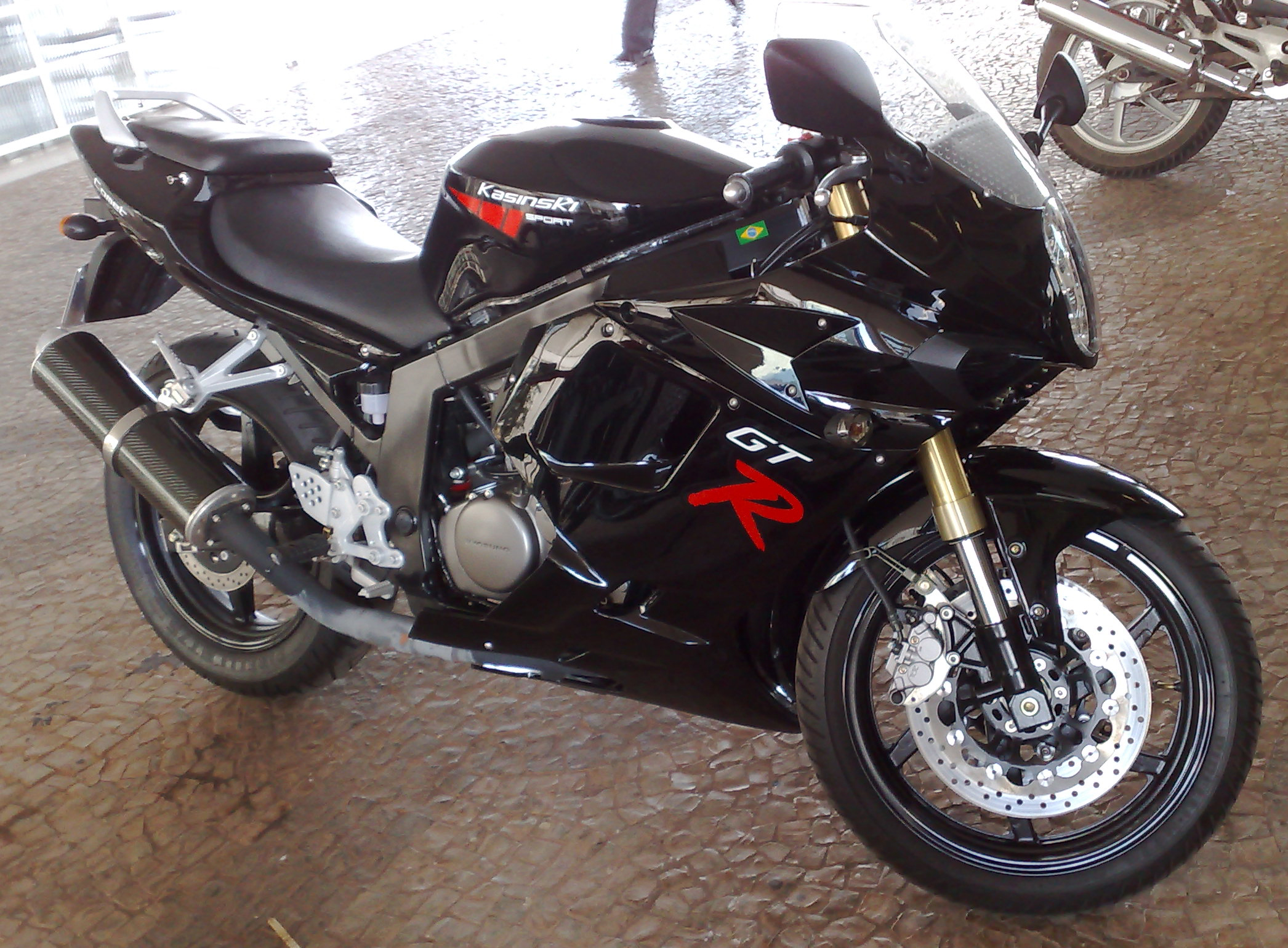
Kasinski GT250R

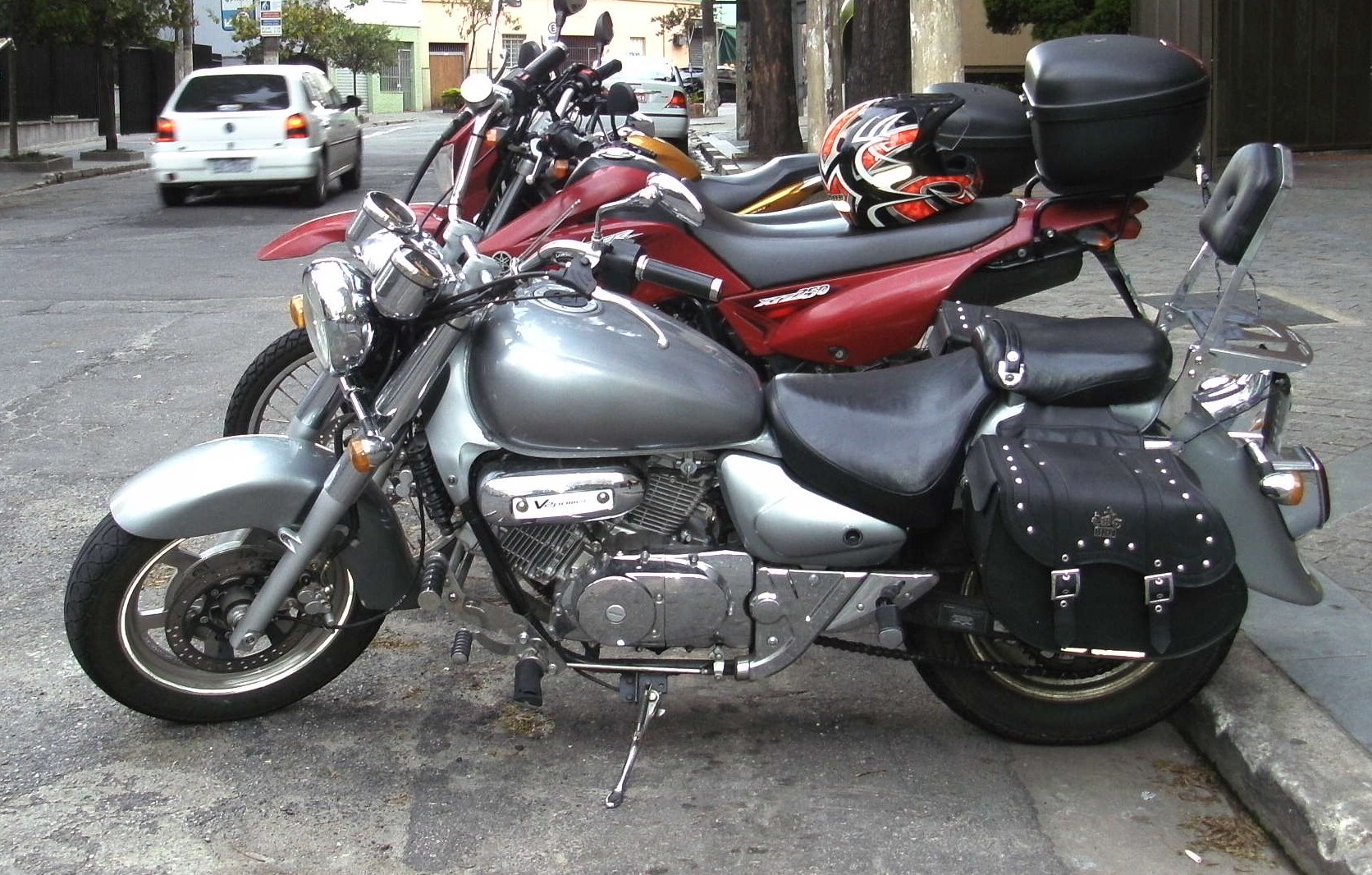
Kasinski Mirage 250 Premier

- Sportbikes Comet
  - Comet GT650R
  - Comet GT250R
- Standards Comet
  - Comet GT650
  - Comet GT250
  - Comet GT150
- Standards
  - Flash
  - Seta
- Cruisers
  - Mirage
  - Mirage Premier
  - Mirage Power
- Scooters
  - Soft
  - Supercab
  - Prima
  - Win
- Off-road bikes
  - CRZ
- Auto rickshaw
  - Motokar
