= Hyosung GT250 =

Motorcycle produced from 2001 to 2016

Hyosung GT250R
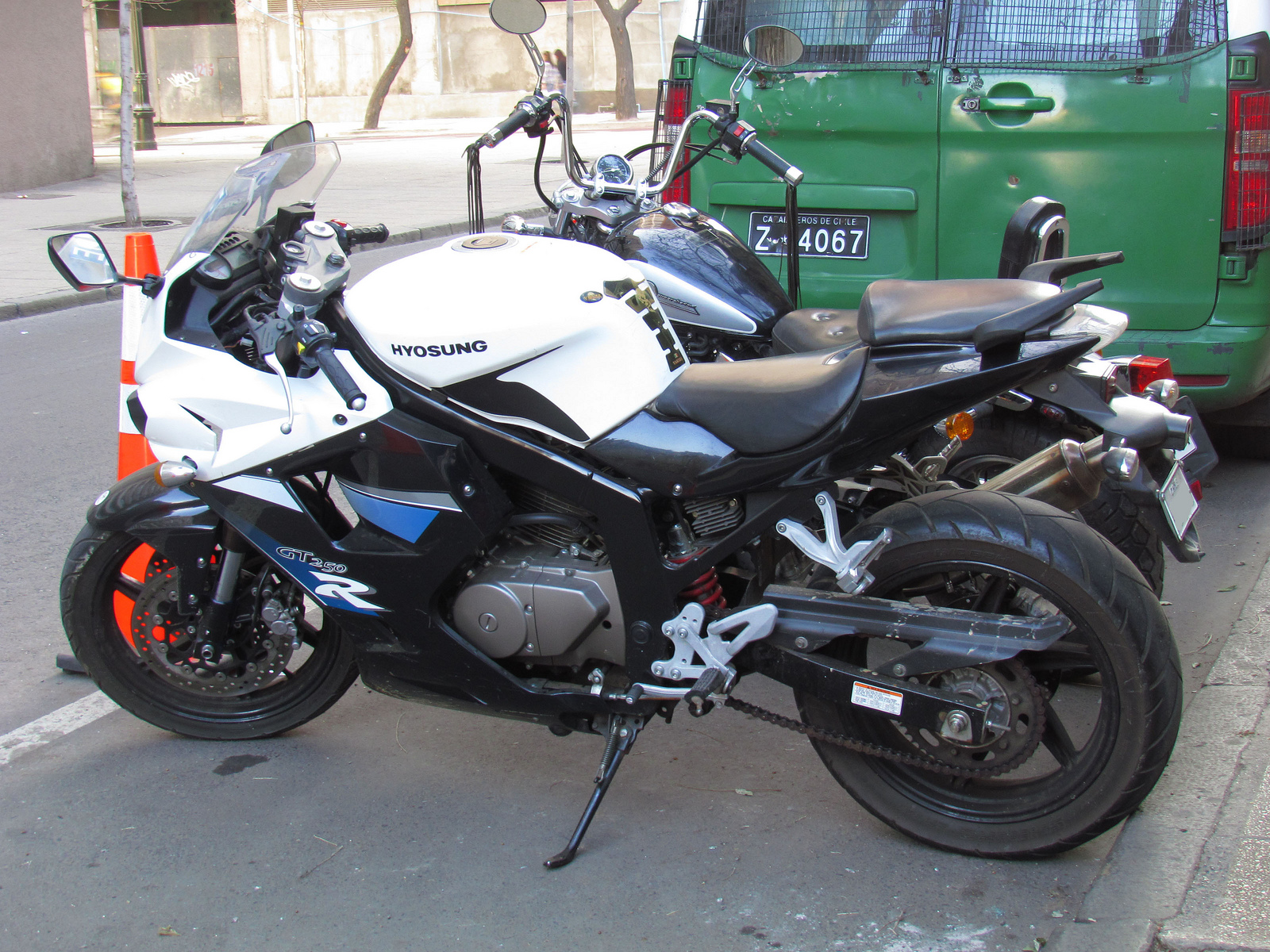
- Manufacturer: Hyosung
- Production: 2001-2016
- Class: Sport bike
- Engine: 249 cc (15.2 cu in) air-cooled (2005–2009) / oil-cooled (2010–present) four-stroke V-twin 75°DOHC
- Bore / stroke: 57 mm × 48.8 mm (2.24 in × 1.92 in)
- Top speed: 180 km/h (110 mph)
- Power: 28 bhp (21 kW); 32.1 hp (23.9 kW) @ 10,500 rpm
- Torque: 16.7 lb⋅ft (22.6 N⋅m) @ 8000 rpm (claimed); 15.7 lb⋅ft (21.3 N⋅m) @ 6,740 rpm
- Suspension: Front: 51 mm (2.0 in) USD Forks; Rear: Mono Shock, Pre-Load Adjustable
- Brakes: Front: Single/Twin (R only); Rear: Single
- Tires: Front: 110/70-17 54H; Rear: 150/60-17 69H
- Wheelbase: 1,445 mm (56.9 in)
- Dimensions: L: 2,080 mm (82 in); W: 655 mm (25.8 in); H: 1,090 mm (43 in)
- Seat height: 780 mm (31 in)
- Weight: 188 kg (414 lb) (claimed) (dry); 187.7 kg (414 lb) (wet)
- Fuel capacity: 17 L (3.7 imp gal; 4.5 US gal)
- Fuel consumption: 3.8 L/100 km; 74 mpg_{‑imp} (62 mpg_{‑US})
- Related: Hyosung Comet Series

The Hyosung GT250 is part of Hyosung's GT series. It shares many parts with its larger displacement siblings and it came in two flavors: GT250 (Comet) (naked bike) and GT250R (sports bike). The GT250 Comet came out in 2004, with the "Comet" suffix being dropped for the newly fuel injected 2010 model. The GT250R came out at the same time and although it seems it never officially had the "Comet" suffix, early fairings do seem to have Comet stickers. Specs are mostly the same, making the appearance the main difference between the two.

The Hyosung GT250R is a 249 cc (15.2 cu in) motorcycle manufactured by Hyosung Motors & Machinery Inc. It entered the market in 2005, offering a 250 cc class sport bike with a frame similar in size to Hyosung's larger GT650 sport bike.

== Engine ==
The GT250R comes stock with a 249 cc V-twin engine. The Hyosung V-twin engine was designed in Hamamatsu Japan by a design team consisting of engineers who have previously worked in the research and development teams of Suzuki. Technical features include roller bearing camshafts, two-piece spring dampened bevel silent primary drive gears, dual squish combustion chambers. It utilizes a DOHC eight-valve engine configuration. Twin downdraft Mikuni carburetors were standard until 2008, when fuel injection became available. Cycle World tested the GT250R's acceleration at 0 to 97 km/h (0 to 60 mph) in 7.6 seconds and 0.0 to 0.4 km (0 to 1/4 mi) in 16.06 seconds at 128.89 km/h (80.09 mph).

== Fuel economy ==
The GT250R's recorded fuel consumption is 3.4 L/100 km (83 mpg_{‑imp}; 69 mpg_{‑US}) in comparison to 4.59 L/100 km (61.5 mpg_{‑imp}; 51.2 mpg_{‑US}) recorded on the Kawasaki Ninja 250R. This allows the GT250R 500 km (310 mi) range from its 17 L (3.7 imp gal; 4.5 US gal) fuel tank. Motorcyclist and Cycle World recorded 3.8 L/100 km; 74 mpg_{‑imp} (62 mpg_{‑US}).

== Suspension and handling ==
Non-adjustable 51 mm inverted forks are combined with a twin-spar steel frame to provide improved handling. Stock suspension setting is firm, providing stability through corners. Although commonly found only in larger-sized sport bikes, the Hyosung GT250R comes standard with a 300 mm front disc setup using twin-piston calipers. The rear brake is a single 230 mm disc.

== 2010 model changes ==
An Australian press release revealed that the 2010 GT250R has been slightly restyled, the most noticeable change taking place on the rear LED stop/tail-lamp.

Electronic fuel injection will be standard on all of Hyosung's 2010 GTxxx models. Not only that, but it will also receive an oil cooler as standard rather than remaining simply air-cooled.

== See also ==
- Hyosung GT650
- Hyosung GD250N EXIV / Naza N5
