= Flexible-fuel vehicles in Brazil =

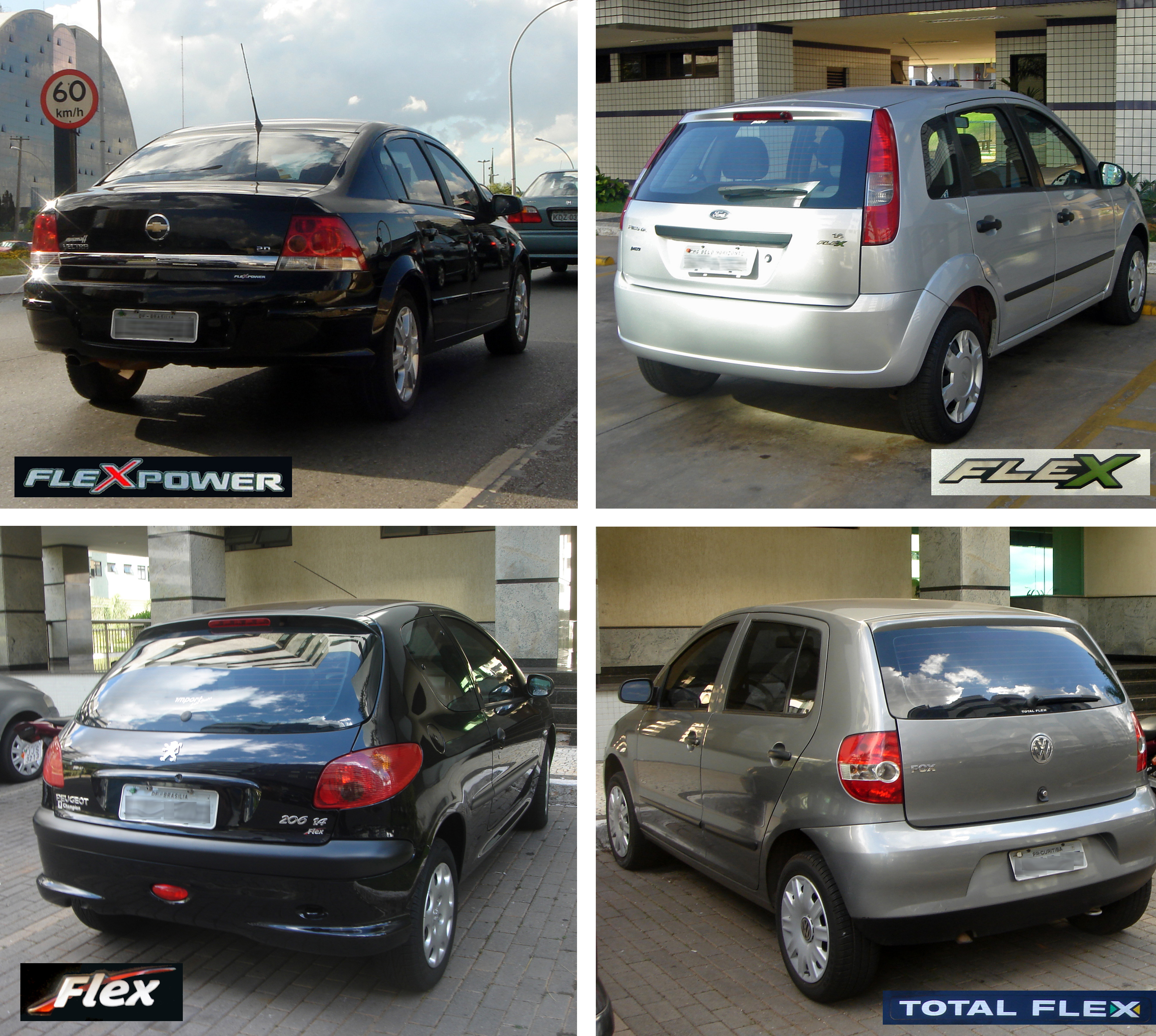
Four typical flex-fuel models from several Brazilian carmakers, popularly known as "flex" cars, that run on any blend of hydrous ethanol (E100) and E20-E25 gasoline.

The fleet of flexible-fuel vehicles in Brazil is the largest in the world. Since their inception in 2003, a total of 30.5 million flex fuel cars and light-duty trucks were registered in the country, and over 6 million flexible-fuel motorcycles, both by March 2018. The market share of flex-fuel autos and light commercial trucks represented 88.6% of all light-duty registrations in 2017. There were over 80 flex car and light truck models available in the market manufactured by 14 major carmakers, and five flex-fuel motorcycles models available as of December 2012.

Brazilian flexible-fuel vehicles are optimized to run on any mix of E20-E25 gasoline and up to 100% hydrous ethanol fuel (E100). Flex vehicles in Brazil are built-in with a small gasoline reservoir for cold starting the engine when temperatures drop below 15 °C (59 °F). An improved flex motor generation was launched in 2009 which eliminated the need for the secondary gas tank.

According to two separate research studies conducted in 2009, 65% of the flex-fuel registered vehicles regularly use ethanol fuel, and use climbs to 93% of flex car owners in São Paulo, the main ethanol producer state where local taxes are lower, and prices are more competitive than gasoline. However, as a result of higher ethanol prices caused by the Brazilian ethanol industry crisis that began in 2009, by November 2013 only 23% flex-fuel car owners were using ethanol regularly, down from 66% in 2009.

== History ==
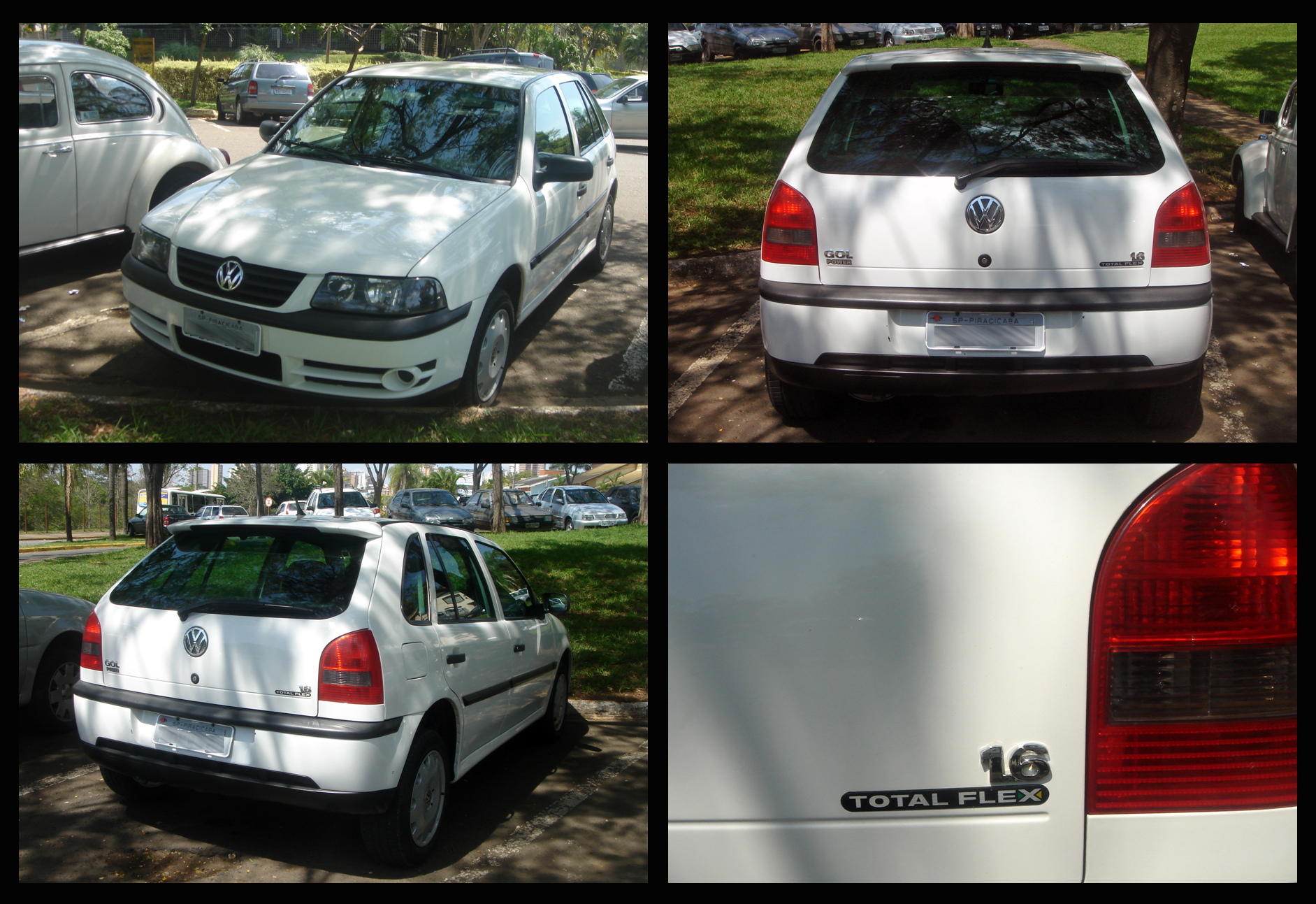
The 2003 Brazilian VW Gol 1.6 Total Flex was the first flexible-fuel car capable of running on any blend of gasoline and ethanol.

After the 1973 oil crisis, the Brazilian government made mandatory the use of ethanol blends with gasoline, and neat ethanol-powered cars (E100 only) were launched to the market in 1979, after testing with several prototypes developed by four carmakers. Brazilian carmakers modified gasoline engines to support ethanol characteristics and changes included compression ratio, amount of fuel injected, replacement of materials that would get corroded by the contact with ethanol, use of colder spark plugs suitable for dissipating heat due to higher flame temperatures, and an auxiliary cold-start system that injects gasoline from a small tank in the engine compartment to help starting when cold.

Flexible-fuel technology started being developed only by the end of the 1990s by Brazilian engineers and in March 2003 Volkswagen do Brasil launched in the market the Gol 1.6 Total Flex, the first commercial flexible fuel vehicle capable of running on any blend of gasoline and ethanol.

== Technology ==
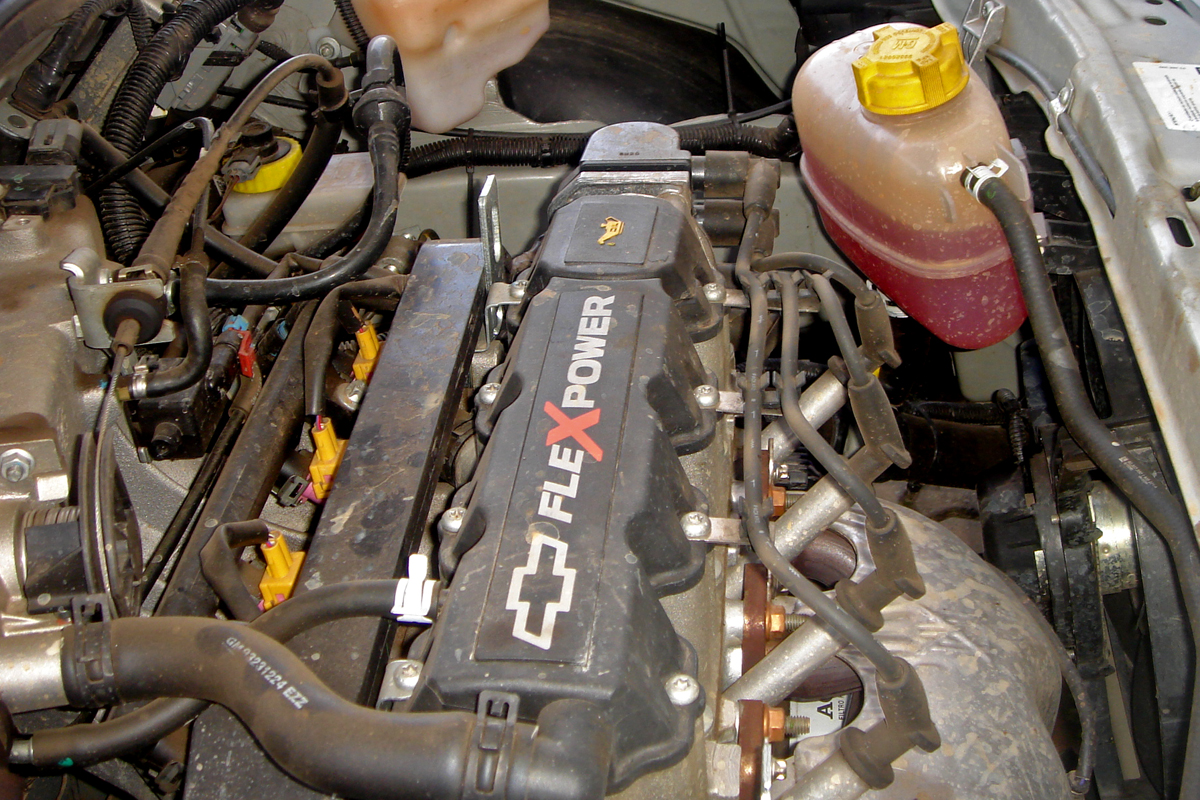
Typical Brazilian flexible-fuel engine with secondary gasoline reservoir for cold starting the engine at temperatures below 15 °C.

The Brazilian flexible fuel car is built with an ethanol-ready engine and one fuel tank for both fuels. The small gasoline reservoir for starting the engine with pure gasoline in cold weather, used in earlier ethanol-only vehicles, was kept in the first generation of Brazilian flexible-fuel cars, mainly for users of the central and southern regions, where winter temperatures normally drop below 15 °C (59 °F). An improved flex motor generation was launched in 2009 that allowed for the elimination of this secondary gas reservoir tank.

A key innovation in the Brazilian flex technology was avoiding the need for an additional dedicated sensor to monitor the ethanol-gasoline mix, which made the first American M85 flex fuel vehicles too expensive. This was accomplished through the lambda probe, used to measure the quality of combustion in conventional engines, is also required to tell the engine control unit (ECU) which blend of gasoline and alcohol is being burned. This task is accomplished automatically through software developed by Brazilian engineers, called "Software Fuel Sensor" (SFS), fed with data from the standard sensors already built-in the vehicle. The technology was developed by the Brazilian subsidiary of Bosch in 1994, but was further improved and commercially implemented in 2003 by the Italian subsidiary of Magneti Marelli, located in Hortolândia, São Paulo. A similar fuel injection technology was developed by the Brazilian subsidiary of Delphi Automotive Systems, and it is called "Multifuel", based on research conducted at its facility in Piracicaba, São Paulo. This technology allows the controller to regulate the amount of fuel injected and spark time, as fuel flow needs to be decreased and also self-combustion needs to be avoided when gasoline is used because ethanol engines have compression ratio around 12:1, too high for gasoline.

Brazilian flex engines are being designed with higher compression ratios, taking advantage of the higher ethanol blends and maximizing the benefits of the higher oxygen content of ethanol, resulting in lower emissions and improving fuel efficiency. The following table shows the evolution and improvement of the different generations of flex engines developed in Brazil.

Comparison of performance of several generations of Brazilian flex-fuel engines (Percentages show change in performance as compared with using gasoline)
Year	Engine compression ratio	Engine power	Engine torque	Fuel efficiency improvement	Gasoline injection cold start system
2003	9.0:1 to 10.5:1	+3%	+2%	-25 to -35%	Yes
2006	11.0:1 to 12.5:1	+7%	+5%	-25 to -30%	Yes
2008	12.0:1 to 13.5:1	+9%	+7%	-20 to -25%	No
Source: Joseph (2007) in The Royal Society (2008), "Sustainable biofuels: prospects and challenges".

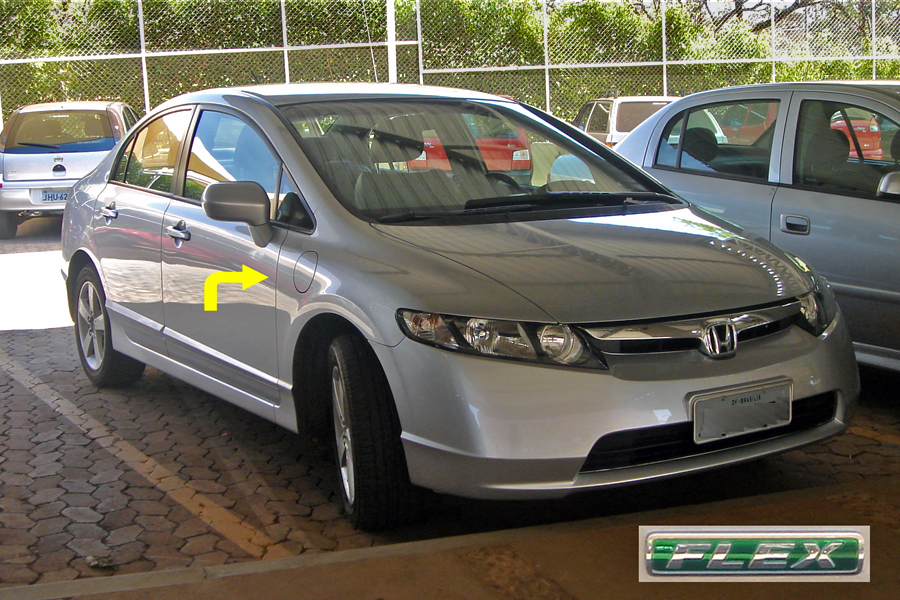
The Brazilian 2008 Honda Civic Flex has outside access to the secondary gasoline reservoir tank from the outside, shown by the arrow in the front right side.

Brazilian flex cars are capable of running on just hydrated ethanol (E100), or just on a blend of gasoline with 20 to 25%anhydrous ethanol, or on any arbitrary combination of both fuels. Pure gasoline is no longer sold in the country because these high ethanol blends are mandatory since 1993. Therefore, all Brazilian automakers have optimized flex vehicles to run with gasoline blends from E20 to E25, so these FFVs are unable to run smoothly with pure gasoline with the exception of two models are specifically built with a flex-fuel engine optimized to operate also with pure gasoline (E0), the Renault Clio Hi-Flex and the Fiat Siena Tetrafuel.

The flexibility of Brazilian FFVs empowers the consumers to choose the fuel depending on current market prices. As ethanol fuel economy is lower than gasoline because of ethanol's energy content is close to 34% less per unit volume than gasoline, flex cars running on ethanol get a lower mileage than when running on pure gasoline. However, this effect is partially offset by the usually lower price per liter of ethanol fuel. As a rule of thumb, Brazilian consumers are frequently advised by the media to use more alcohol than gasoline in their mix only when ethanol prices are 30% lower or more than gasoline, as ethanol price fluctuates heavily depending on the result of seasonal sugar cane harvests.

== Production and market share ==
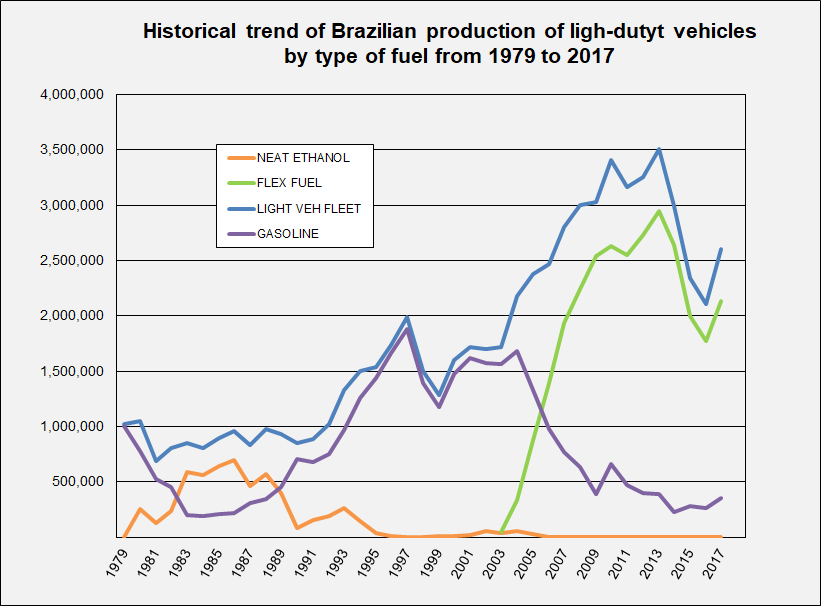
Historical trend of Brazilian production of light vehicles by type of fuel, neat ethanol, flex fuel, and gasoline powered-vehicles from 1979 to 2017.

After the market launch of the Gol 1.6 Total Flex, the first commercial flexible fuel vehicle capable of running on any blend of gasoline and ethanol, GM do Brasil followed three months later with the Chevrolet Corsa 1.8 Flexpower, using an engine developed by a joint-venture with Fiat called PowerTrain. As of July 2013, the following 14 carmakers build and sell flexible fuel vehicles in Brazil: Citroën, Chery, Fiat, Ford, GM do Brasil (Chevrolet), Honda, Hyundai, Kia Motors, Mitsubishi, Nissan, Peugeot, Renault, Toyota and Volkswagen.

Flexible fuel vehicles were 22% of the new car sales in 2004, 73% in 2005, 87.6% in July 2008, and reached a record 94% in August 2009. The production of flex-fuel cars and light commercial vehicles since 2003 reached 10 million vehicles in March 2010, and 15 million in January 2012. Registrations of flex-fuel cars and light trucks represented 87.0% of all passenger and light duty vehicles sold in the country in 2012. Production passed the 20 million-unit mark in June 2013.

By the end of 2014, flex-fuel cars represented 54% of the Brazilian registered stock of light-duty vehicles, while gasoline only vehicles represented 34.3%. As of June 2015, flex-fuel light-duty vehicle sales totaled 25.5 million units. The market share of flex vehicles reached 88.6% of all light-duty registrations in 2017. As of March 2018, fifteen years after the launch of the first flex fuel car, there were 30.5 million flex cars and light trucks registered in the country, and 6 million flex motorcycles.

The rapid success of flex vehicles was made possible by the existence of 33,000 filling stations with at least one ethanol pump available by 2006, a heritage of the early Pró-Álcool ethanol program. These facts, together with the mandatory use of E25 blend of gasoline throughout the country, allowed Brazil in 2008 to achieve more than 50% of fuel consumption in the gasoline market from sugar cane-based ethanol.

According to two separate research studies conducted in 2009, at the national level 65% of the flex-fuel registered vehicles regularly used ethanol fuel, and use climbed to 93% in São Paulo, the main ethanol producer state where local taxes are lower, and E100 prices at the pump are usually more competitive than gasoline. However, as a result of higher ethanol prices caused by the Brazilian ethanol industry crisis that began in 2009, combined with government subsidies set to keep gasoline price lower than the international market value, by November 2013 only 23% flex-fuel car owners were using ethanol regularly, down from 66% in 2009.

Ethanol flex-fuel motor vehicle production in Brazil 2003-2017^{(1)(2)}
Year	Flex autos produced	Flex light trucks produced	Total flex-fuel light-duty vehicles produced	Flex vehicles as % total light vehicles^{(1)(2)}	Flex motor- cycles produced^{(3)}	Flex motor- cycles as % total
2003	39,853	9,411	49,264	2.9		
2004	282,710	49,797	332,507	15.2		
2005	820,791	60,150	880,941	37.1		
2006	1,291,913	100,142	1,392,055	56.3		
2007	1,764,494	172,437	1,936,931	69.1		
2008	2,026,768	216,800	2,243,648	74.7		
2009	2,298,942	242,211	2,541,153	84.0	188,494	12.2
2010	2,311,721	315,380	2,627,111	77.1	332,351	18.2
2011	2,215,548	335,234	2,550,782	80.7	956,117	44.7
2012	2,418,397	313,663	2,732,060	83.9	814,110	48.2
2013	2,616,845	333,766	2,950,611	84.2	NA	
2014	2,291,115	346,607	2,637,722	88.2	NA	
2015	1,785,284	212,473	1,997,757	85.4	NA	
2016	1,605,855	164,813	1,770,668	84.0	NA	
2017	1,923,143	207,035	2,130,178	81.9	NA	
Total 2003-17	25,693,379	3,080,009	28,773,388	70.3	2,291,072	31.8
Sources: Cars and light trucks: ANFAVEA (2003-2017). Motorcycles: ABRACICLO 2009, 2010, 2011, and 2012. Notes: (1) Includes exports and excludes flex imports from the other Mercosur countries. (2) Total includes gasoline, neat ethanol, flex, and diesel-powered vehicles. (3) Total between 2009 and 2012 only

== Latest developments ==
=== Flex-fuel motorcycles ===
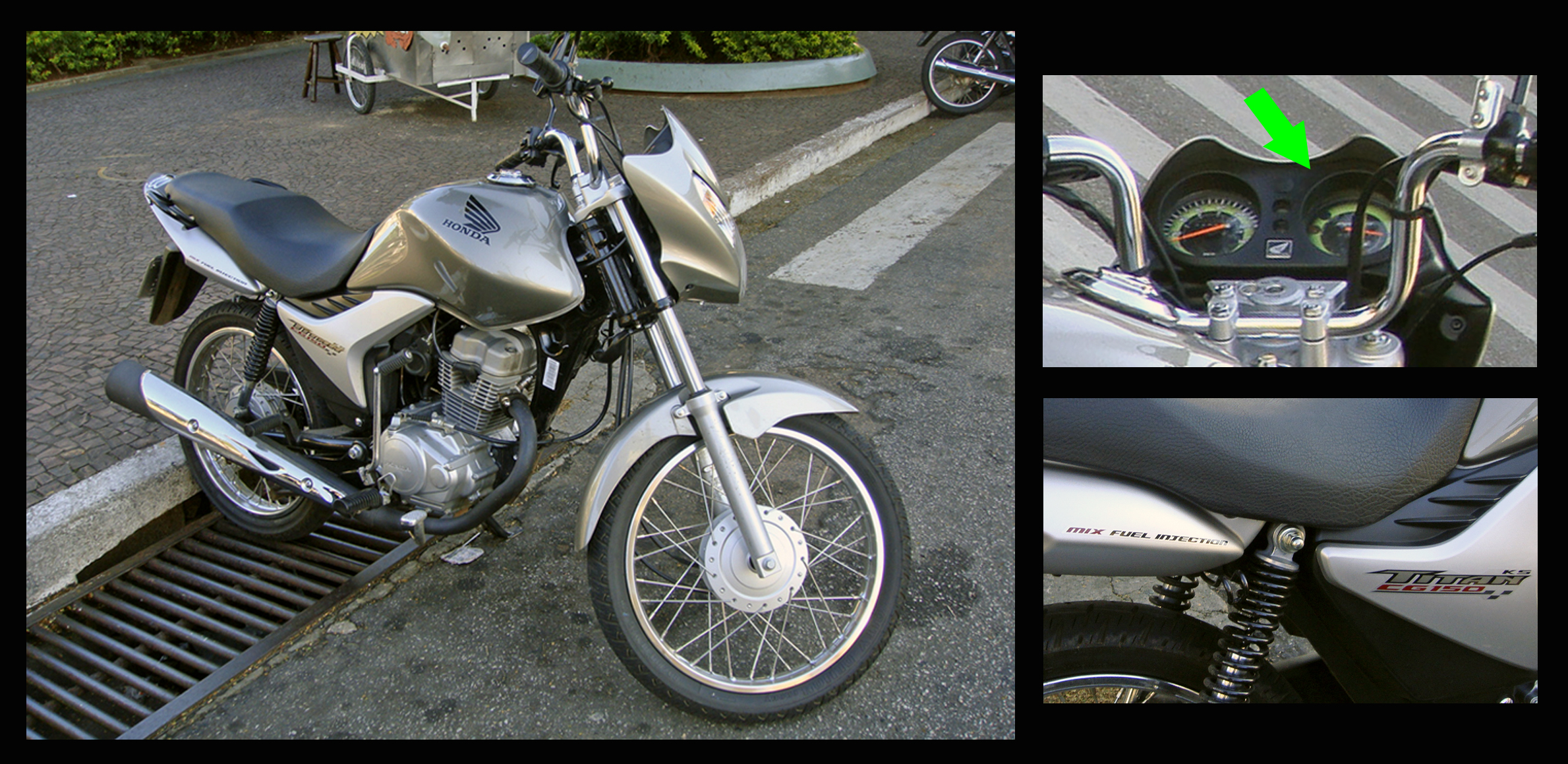
The Honda CG 150 Titan Mix was the first flex-fuel motorcycle sold in the world. The fuel gauge has a warning mix light indicating the minimum gasoline blend required to avoid cold start problems.

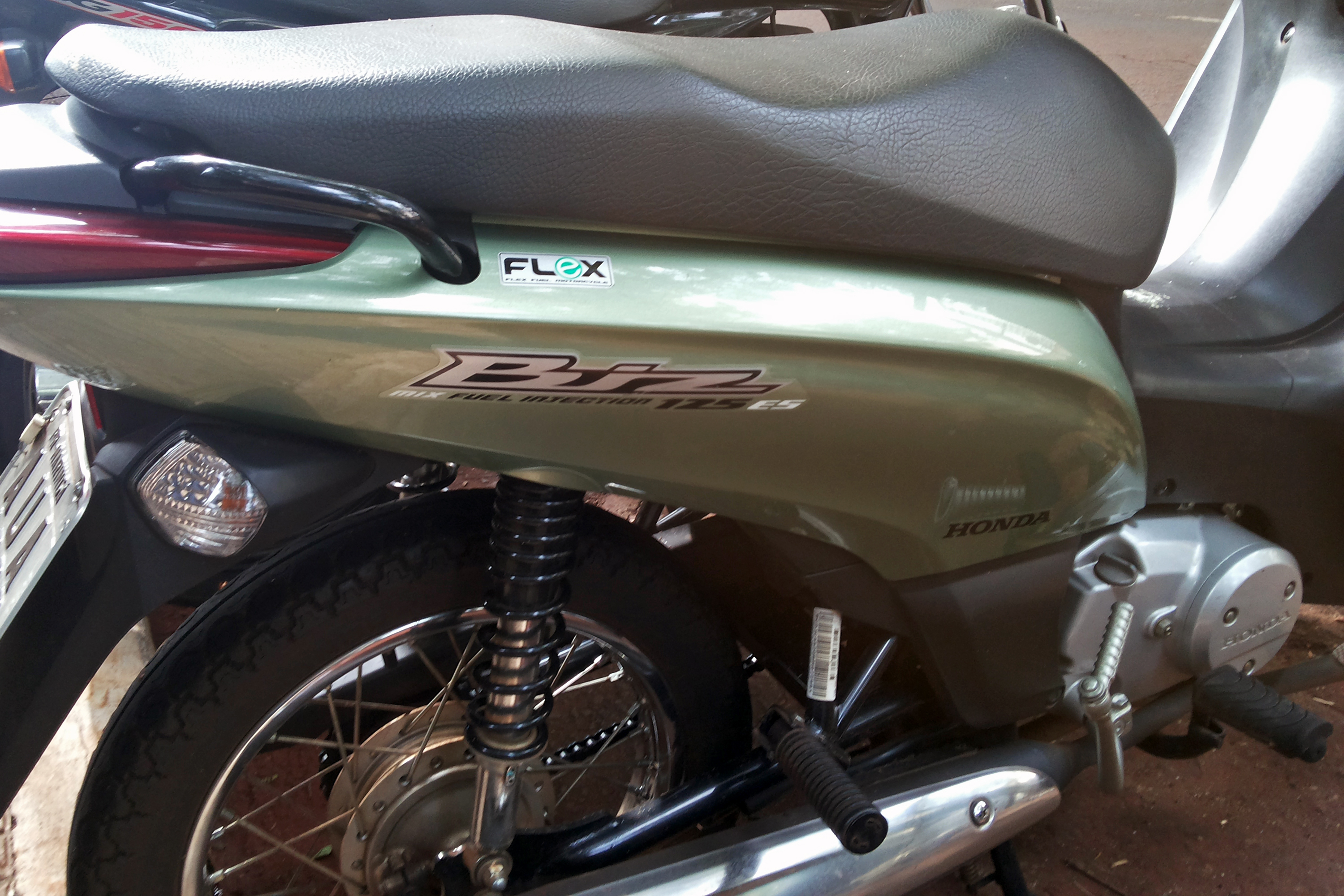
The Honda Biz 125 flex is one of the five flex-fuel motorcycles available in Brazil

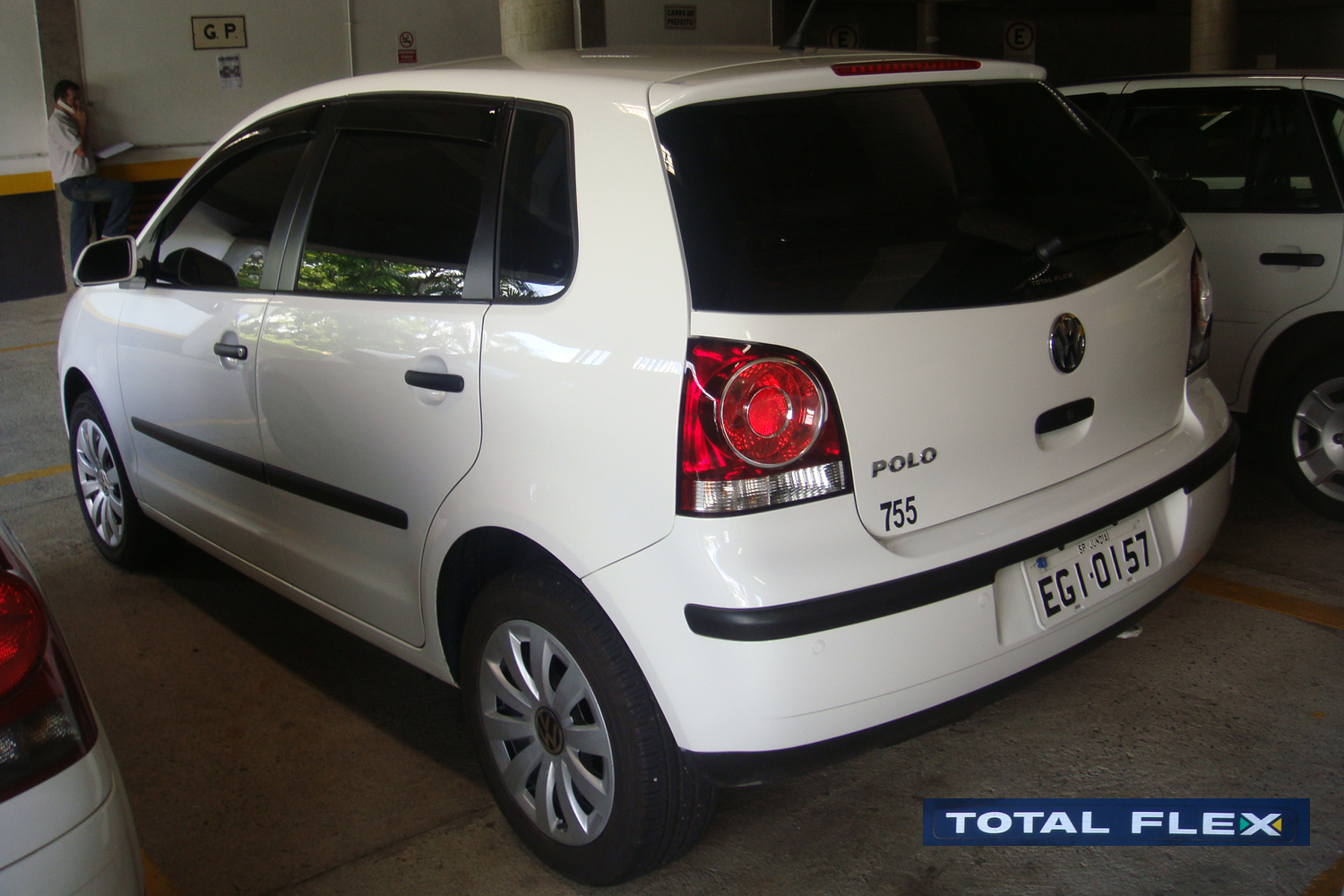
The Brazilian Volkswagen Polo E-Flex 2009 was the first flex fuel model without an auxiliary tank for cold start.

The latest innovation within the Brazilian flexible-fuel technology, is the development of flex-fuel motorcycles. In 2007 Magneti Marelli presented the first motorcycle with flex technology, adapted on a Kasinski Seta 125, and based on the Software Fuel Sensor (SFS) the firm developed for flex-fuel cars in Brazil. Delphi Automotive Systems also presented in 2007 its Multifuel injection technology for motorcycles. Besides the flexibility in the choice of fuels, a main objective of the fuel-flex motorcycles is to reduce CO_{2} emissions by 20 percent, and savings in fuel consumption in the order of 5% to 10% are expected. AME Amazonas Motocicletas announced that sales of its motorcycle AME GA (G stands for gasoline and A for alcohol) were scheduled for 2009, but the first flex-fuel motorcycle was actually launched by Honda in March 2009. Produced by its Brazilian subsidiary Moto Honda da Amazônia, the CG 150 Titan Mix is sold for around US$2,700.

Because the CG 150 Titan Mix does not have a secondary gas tank for a cold start like the Brazilian flex cars do, the tank must have at least 20% of gasoline to avoid start up problems at temperatures below 15 °C (59 °F). The motorcycle's panel includes a gauge to warn the driver about the actual ethanol-gasoline mix in the storage tank. In September 2009, Honda launched a second flexible-fuel motorcycle, the on-off-road NXR 150 Bros Mix. During the first eight months after its market launch the CG 150 Titan Mix sold 139,059 motorcycles, capturing a 10.6% market share, and ranking second in sales of new motorcycles in the Brazilian market by October 2009, and by year's end, both Honda flexible-fuel motorcycles sold a total of 183,375 units, representing an 11.4% market share of the Brazilian new motorcycle sales in that year. Cumulative sales of both flex fuel motorcycles reached 515,726 units in 2010, and sales in that year represented 18.15% of all motorcycle produced.

Two other flex-fuel motorcycles manufactured by Honda were launched in October 2010 and January 2011, the GC 150 FAN and the Honda BIZ 125 Flex. During 2011 a total of 956,117 flex-fuel motorcycles were produced, raising its market share to 56.7%. Cumulative production of the four available flex fuel models since 2009 reached 1.48 million units in December 2011. The 2 million mark was reached in August 2012. Flexible-fuel motorcycle production passed the 3 million-unit milestone in October 2013, and the 4 million mark in March 2015.

=== Next generation of flex engines ===
The Brazilian subsidiaries of Magneti Marelli, Delphi and Bosch have developed and announced the introduction in 2009 of a new flex engine generation that eliminates the need for the secondary gasoline tank by warming the ethanol fuel during starting, and allowing flex vehicles to do a normal cold start at temperatures as low as−5 °C (23 °F), the lowest temperature expected anywhere in the Brazilian territory. Another improvement is the reduction of fuel consumption and tailpipe emissions, between 10% and 15% as compared to flex motors sold in 2008. In March 2009 Volkswagen do Brasil launched the Polo E-Flex, the first flex fuel model without an auxiliary tank for cold start. The Flex Start system used by the Polo was developed by Bosch.

=== Direct injection ===
In 2013, Ford launched the first flex fuel car with direct injection: the Focus 2.0 Duratec Direct Flex.

=== Hybrid flex ===
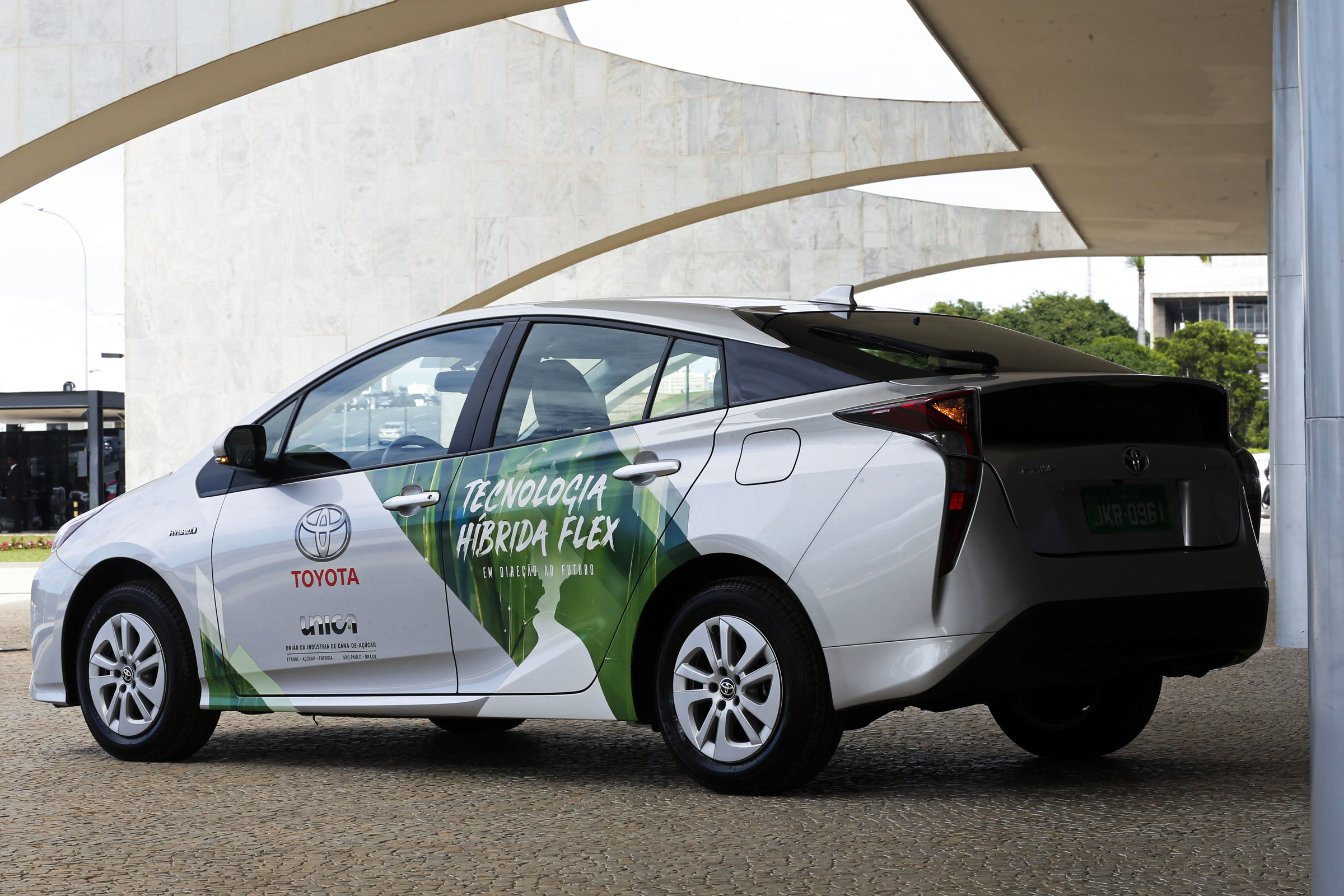
First commercial flex-fuel hybrid electric car tested with a Toyota Prius as development mule.

In December 2018, Toyota do Brasil announced the development of the world's first commercial hybrid electric car with flex-fuel engine capable of running with electricity and ethanol fuel or gasoline. The flexible fuel hybrid technology was developed in partnership with several Brazilian federal universities, and a prototype was tested for six months using a Toyota Prius as development mule. Toyota plans to invest about US$300 million in one of its existing Brazilian plants to start production of a flex hybrid electric car for the Brazilian market in the second half of 2019.

Toyota explained that the development of the commercial flex hybrid was possible thanks to the "Rota 2030" (English: Road Map 2030) Federal Program which, beginning in 2019, reduces purchase taxes for customers, and provides tax credits over the next five years for those carmakers investing in new technologies to manufacture in the country more efficient and less polluting vehicles.

The Twelfth generation Toyota Corolla will be available with a flexible hybrid version available from October 2019, making it the first flexible-fuel car in Brazil, and in the world.

== Flex fuel conversion kit ==
Flex fuel conversion kits are categorised as aftermarket AFV (Alternative Fuel Vehicle) conversions since they enable regular equipment built vehicles to be modified to run on propane, natural gas, methane gas, ethanol, or electricity. Except for those that are finished to enable a vehicle to run on electricity, all vehicle adaptations must adhere to current relevant, Environmental Protection Agency (EPA) standards.

== List of currently produced flexible-fuel vehicles ==
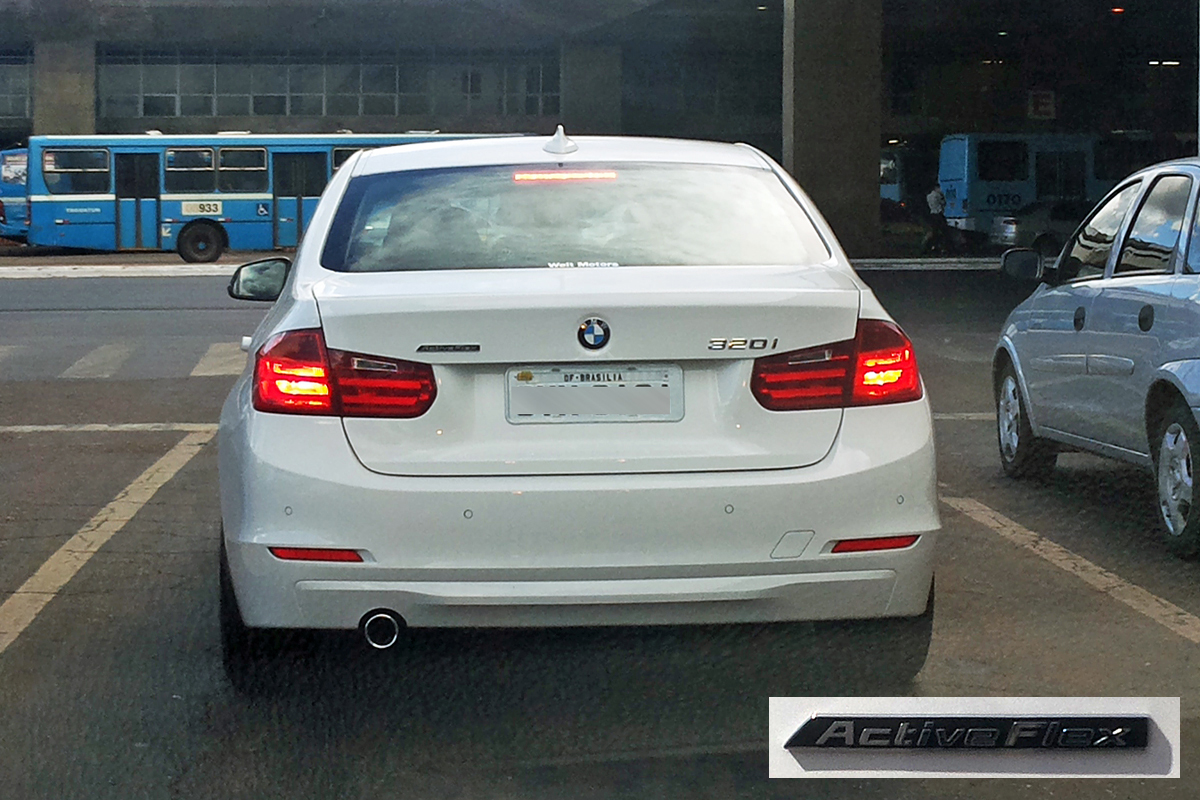
BMW 320i ActiveFlex

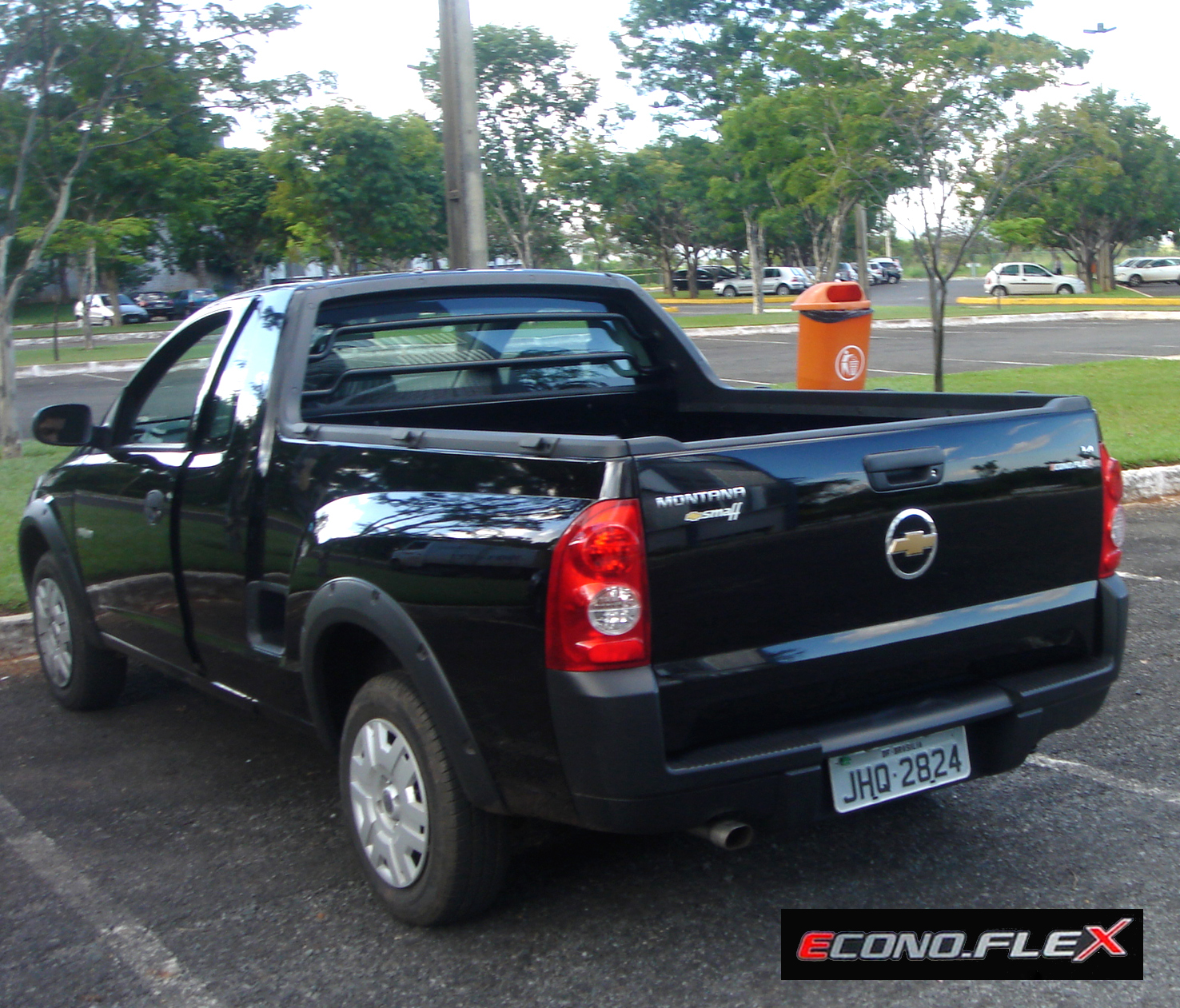
Chevrolet Montana EconoFlex(Brazilian version).

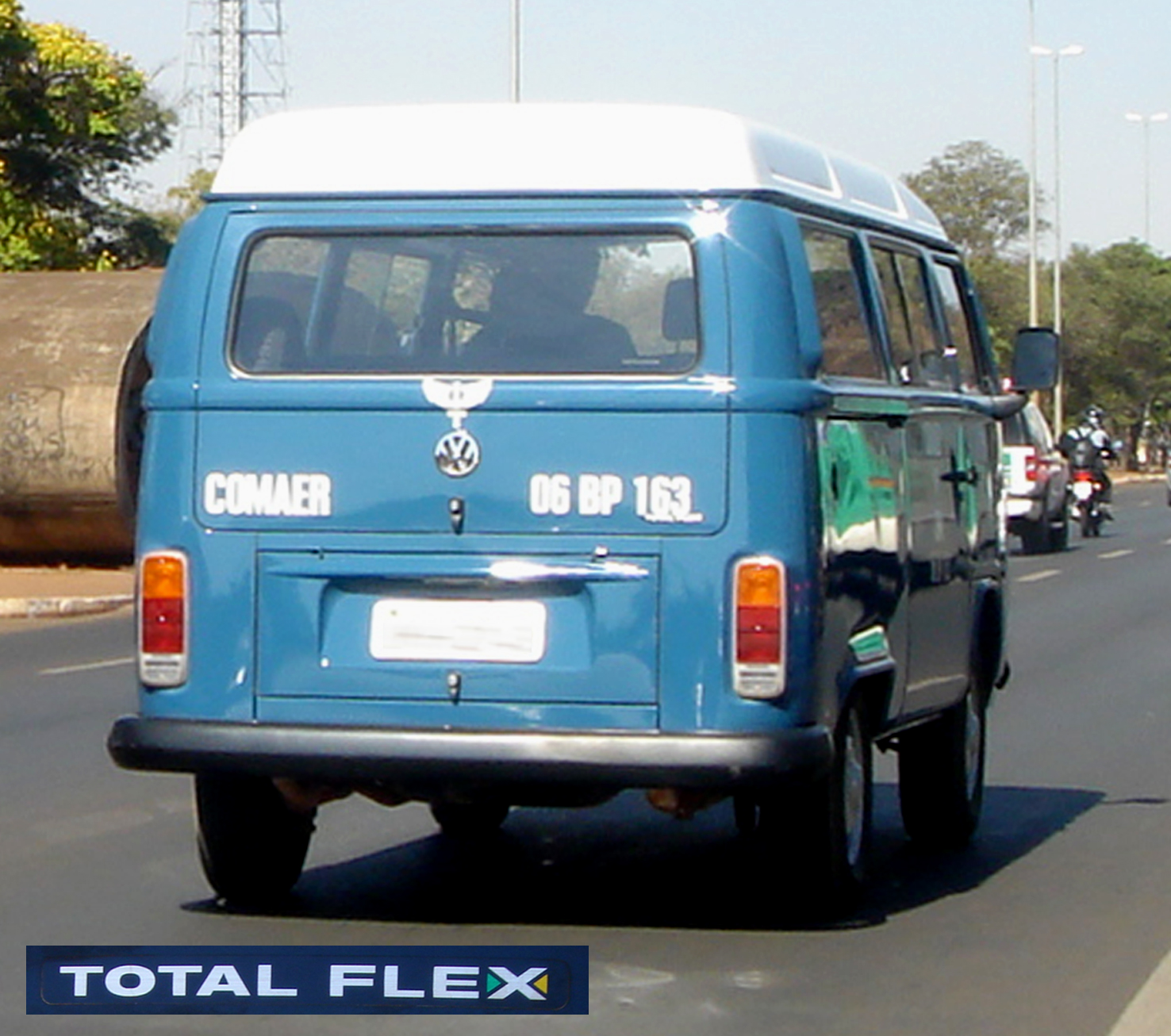
VW Type 2 TotalFlex(Brazilian version, known as "Kombi").

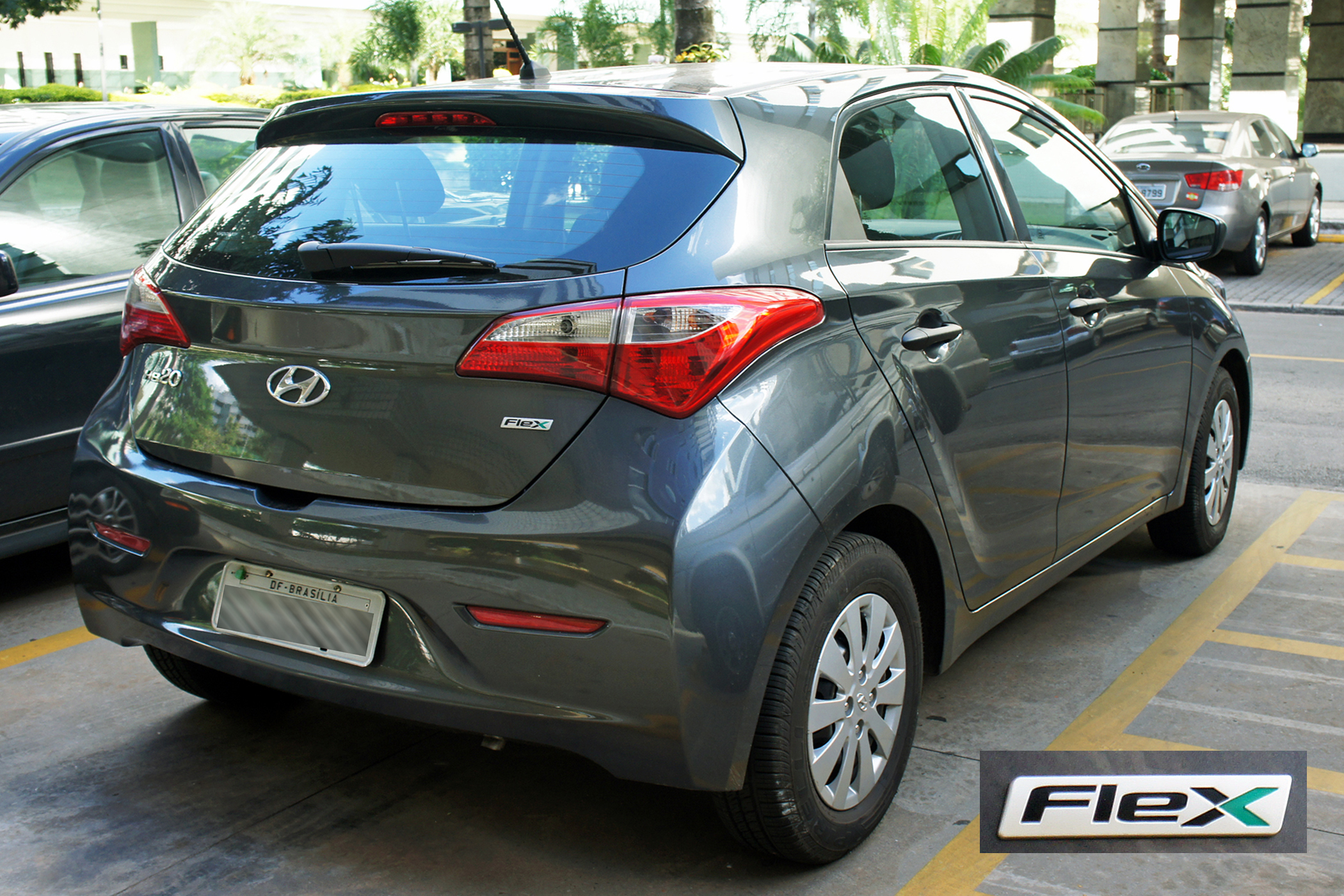
Hyundai HB20

The following is a list of flex-fuel automobiles and light-duty vehicles available in Brazil as of February 2019.

- BMW

BMW X1, BMW X2

- Chevrolet

Cruze, Montana, Prisma, S10, Onix, Cobalt, Spin, Tracker

- Citroën

C3, C4 Lounge, C4 Cactus, Aircross, Berlingo

- Fiat

Doblò, Palio Weekend, Argo, Cronos, Grand Siena, Strada, Uno, Toro, Fiorino, Mobi, Uno

- Ford

EcoSport, Fiesta, Focus, Fusion, Ka, Ford Ranger CD

- Honda

City, Civic, Fit, CR-V, HR-V, WR-V and four motorcycles CG Titan Mix, NXR 150 Bros Mix, GC 150 Fan Flex and the BIZ 125 Flex

- Hyundai

Hyundai HB20, Hyundai Creta, Hyundai ix35

- Kia Motors

Picanto, Soul, Sportage, Cerato

- Mitsubishi

ASX

- Nissan

Sentra, Tiida, March, Kicks

- Peugeot

208, 308, 408, 2008

- Renault

Duster, Logan, Sandero, Kwid, Captur

- Toyota

Toyota Corolla, Etios, Yaris, Hilux, SW4

- Volkswagen

CrossFox, Fox, Gol, Golf, Polo, Saveiro, SpaceFox, Up, Voyage, T-Cross, Tiguan, Virtus, Jetta

- Yamaha

Two motorcycles Fazer 250 Blueflex and Ténéré 250 Blueflex.

== See also ==
- Alternative fuel vehicle
- Ethanol fuel in Brazil
- Flexible-fuel vehicles in the United States
- List of flexible-fuel vehicles by car manufacturer
