= Hyosung RX125 =

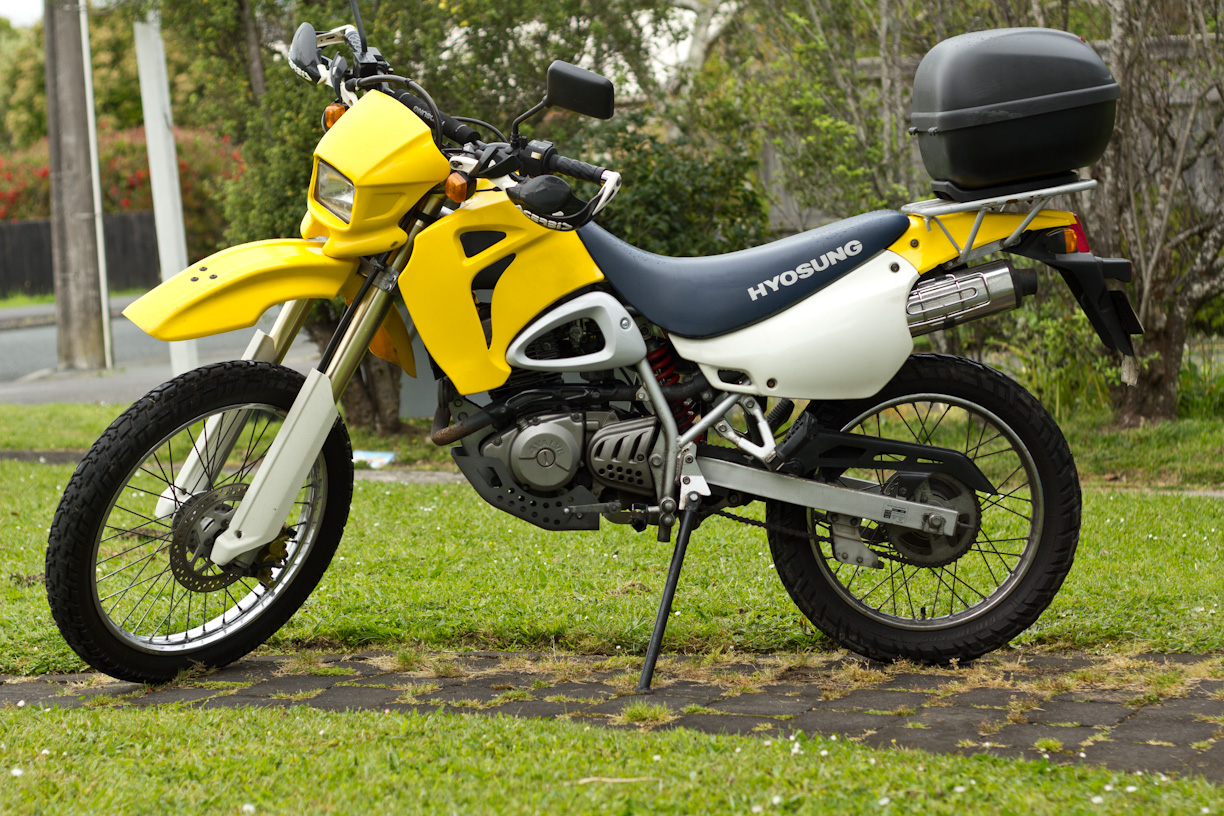
- 2001 Hyosung XRX125 in Auckland, New Zealand
- Manufacturer: Hyosung Motors & Machinery Inc.
- Also called: Hyosung XRX125
- Class: Dual-sport
- Engine: 124.5 cc, single-cylinder, air- and oil-cooled, four-stroke, SOHC, 4-valves
- Bore / stroke: 57 mm × 48.8 mm (2.24 in × 1.92 in)
- Compression ratio: 9.9:1
- Power: 11.9 hp (9 kW) @ 8500 rpm
- Torque: 9.9 N⋅m (7 lb⋅ft) @ 7500 rpm
- Transmission: 5-speed
- Frame type: Tubular steel
- Suspension: Front: USD; Rear: swingarm
- Brakes: Front: 1 disc Rear: drum
- Tires: Front: 21 inch Rear: 18 inch
- Wheelbase: 1,425 mm (56 in)
- Dimensions: L: 2,190 mm (86 in); W: 800 mm (31 in); H: 1,160 mm (46 in)
- Seat height: 790 mm (31 in)
- Weight: 125 kg (276 lb) (dry)
- Fuel capacity: 9 L (2.0 imp gal; 2.4 US gal)
- Oil capacity: 1.4 L (0.31 imp gal; 0.37 US gal)
- Related: Suzuki DR125

The Hyosung RX125 (also known as the XRX125 in some markets) was a lightweight dual purpose motorcycle manufactured by the South Korean motorcycle company Hyosung. The Hyosung RX125 was produced from 1998 until 2009 and available in many markets including: Asia, Europe, North America and Oceania. In Brazil it has been assembled from CKD kits by the now-defunct Kasinski Motos, and rebadged as a Kasinski product. The RX125 features an air- and oil-cooled 125cc single cylinder SOHC engine. The maximum power output of the engine is 9 kW at 8500 rpm.
