= KR Motors =

South Korean motorcycle manufacturer

KR Motors Co. Ltd.
- Company type: Public
- Industry: Motorcycle manufacturing
- Founded: 5 June 1978; 48 years ago
- Headquarters: Changwon, Gyeongsangnam-do, South Korea
- Key people: Sang Yong Sung

KR Motors Co. Ltd. (Korean: KR모터스) is a South Korean motorcycle manufacturer. It is a subsidiary of Synergy Partners Co Ltd.

== History ==
Founded in 1978 as a division of the Hyosung Group of industries, Hyosung began producing Japanese Suzuki motorcycle designs under license for the South Korean market in Changwon, South Korea in 1979. In 1986, they established their own research and development center in Hamamatsu, Japan, and the next year, they began mass production of their own designs. They were the official motorcycle supplier for the 1988 Summer Olympics in Seoul. In 2003, Hyosung Motors & Machinery Inc. was spun off from the Hyosung Group to become its own corporate entity. In June 2007, Hyosung Motors Division was acquired by Korean company S&T Group (Science and Technology), and the name was changed to S&T Motors. In 2014 S&T Motors was acquired by Kolao Holdings (now known as LVMC Holdings), and the name was changed to KR Motors.

== Current products ==
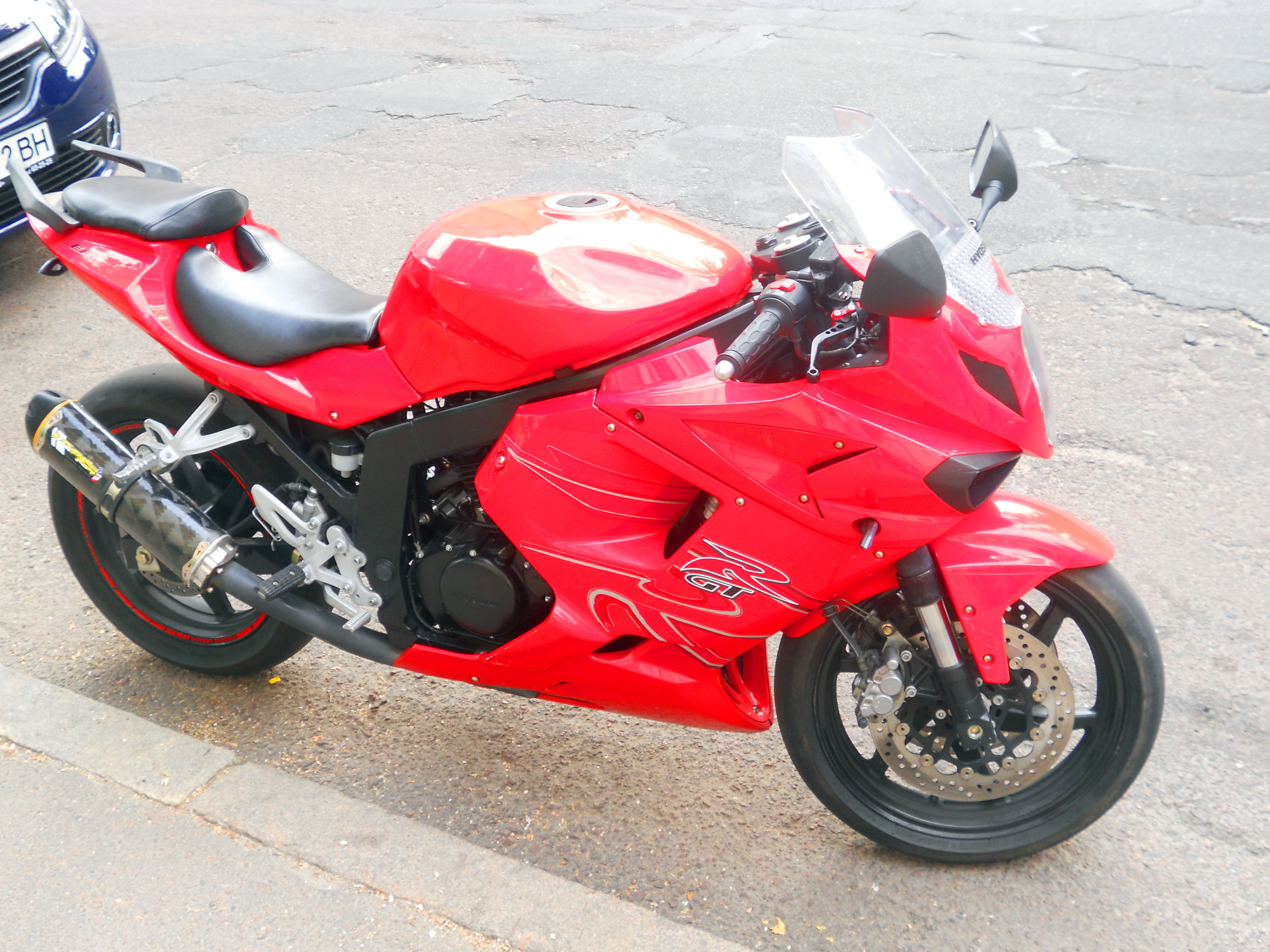
Hyosung GTR 250 in Ukraine

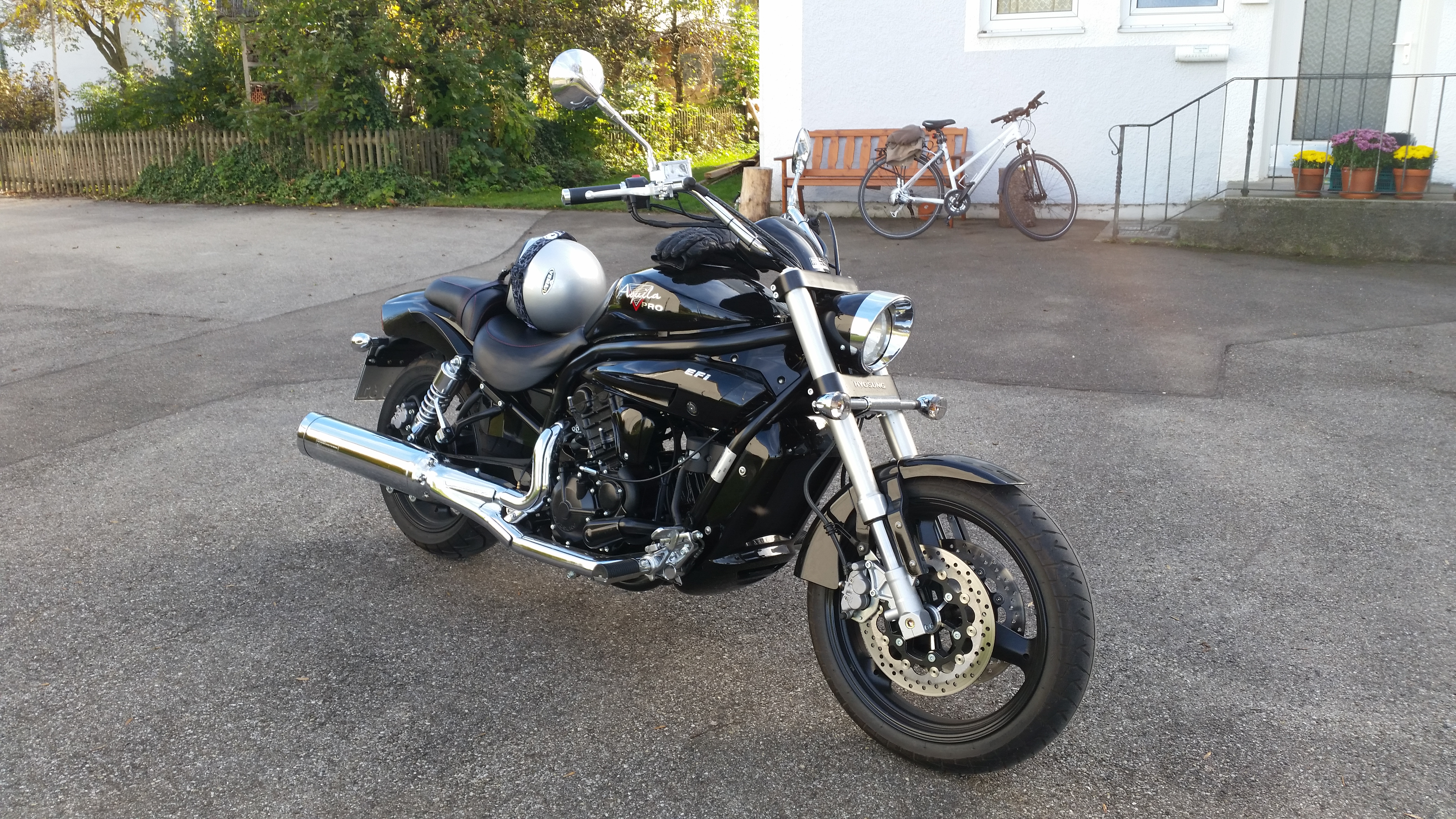
Hyosung GV 650 Aquila

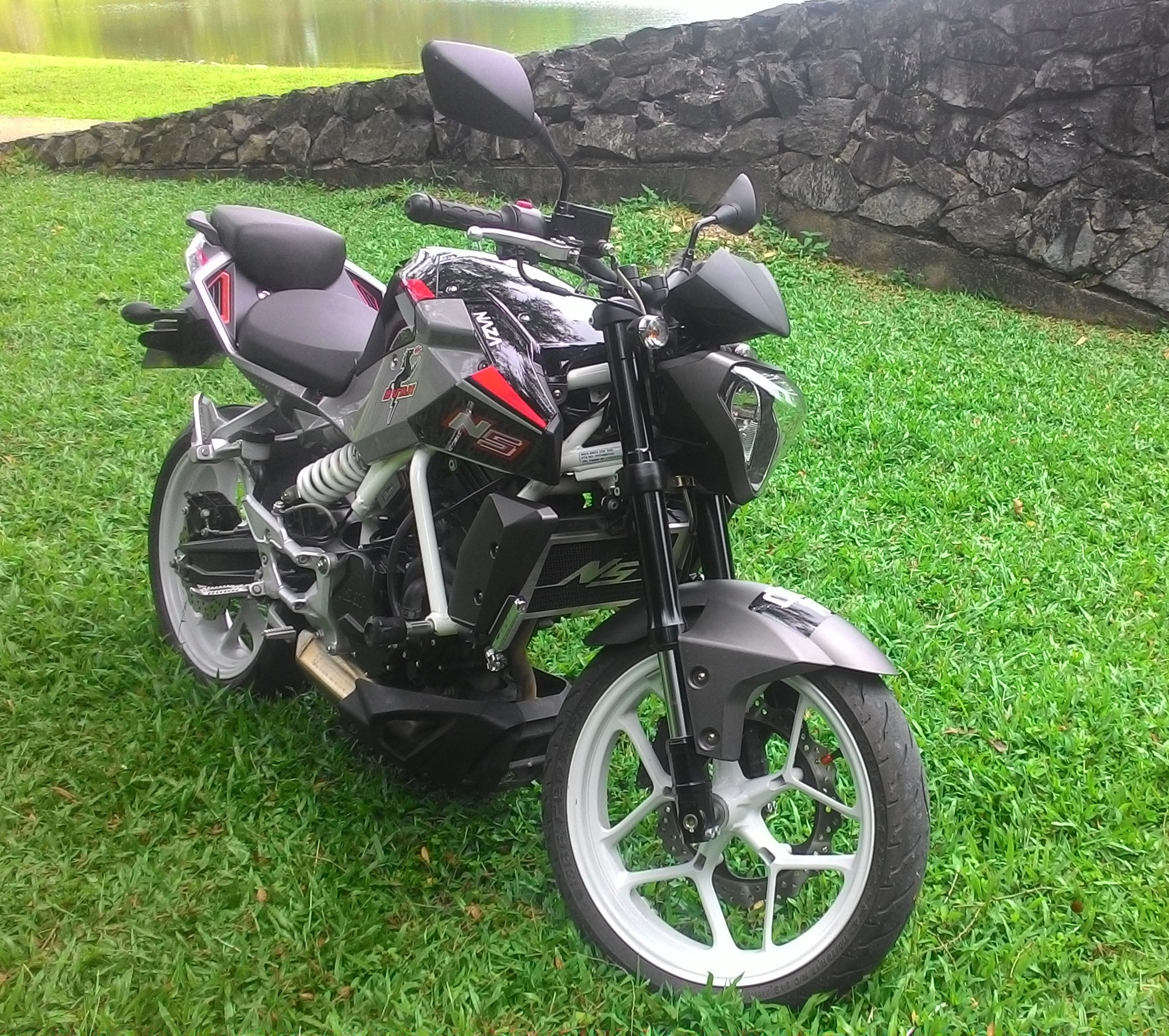
Hyosung GD250N

Recently, KR Motors has expanded from its traditional business of simple and efficient bikes for commuting into the recreational market. This includes adding models with larger engine displacement, up to 678cc and expanding into developed markets such as Australia, Northern Europe, Canada, India, Middle East, Thailand and the United States.

Sportbikes "Comet"

- GT650R
- GT650S
- GT250R
- GD250R / Naza N5R
- GT125R

Standards - "Comet"

- GT650
- GT250
- GT125
- GD250N

Cruisers

- ST7
- GV650 - "Mirage/Aquila"
- GV250 - "Mirage/Aquila"
- GV125C

"Work" motorcycles

- KR110

Scooters

- Exceed
- Megajet
- Rapid
- SF50 "Prima"
- SF50R "Rally"/"Rally50"
- SF100 "Rally100"
- SD50 "Sense"
- MS3 125/250
- Grand Prix 125 4T
- Supercap

Off-road bikes

- RT 125
- RX125
- Troy

ATVs

- TE50
- TE100
- TE450
- LT160
