= Hyosung GV650 =

GV650 Aquila
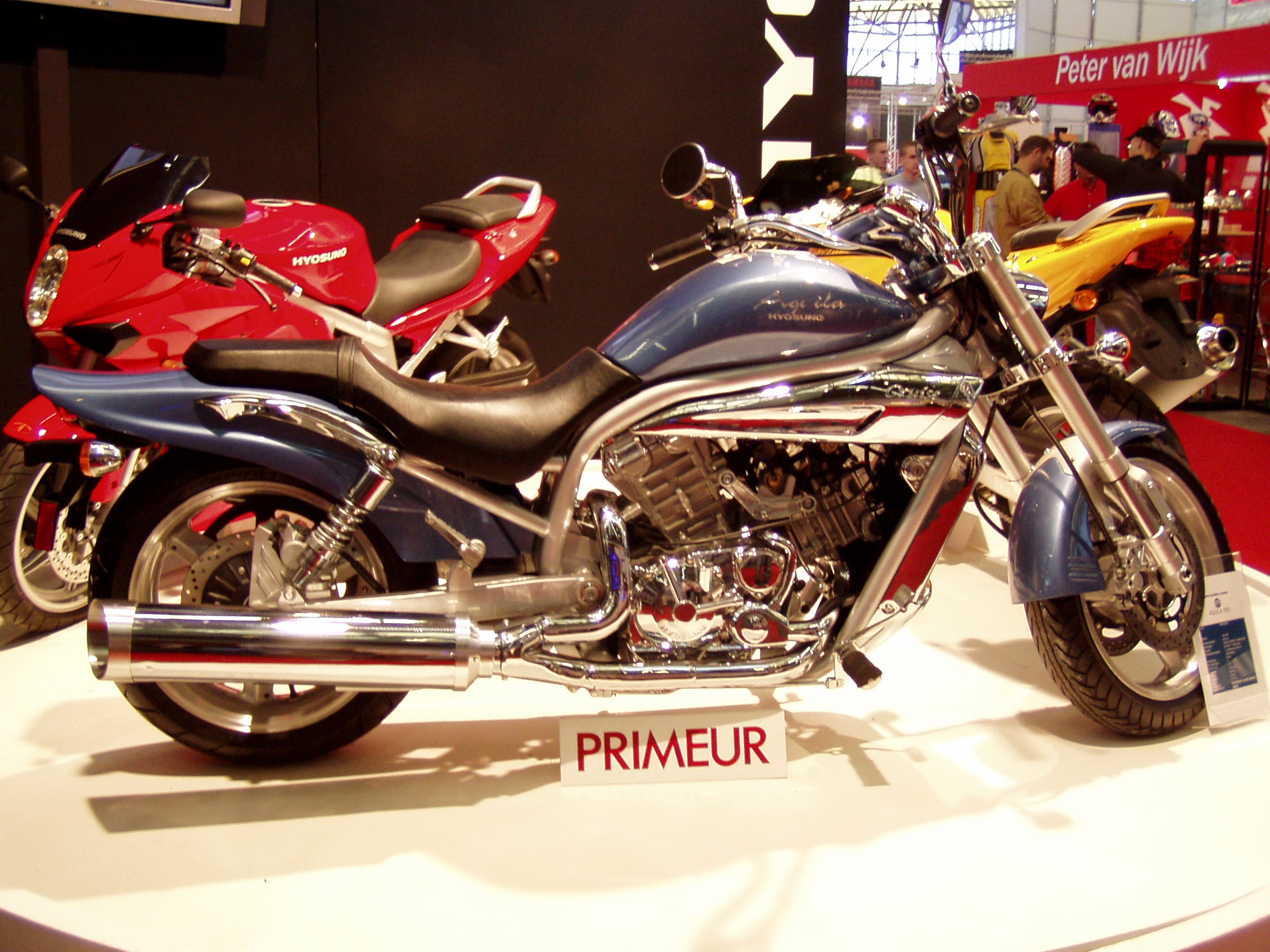
- Manufacturer: Hyosung
- Also called: Avitar, Mirage
- Parent company: Hyosung (KR Motors)
- Production: 2006 - present
- Class: cruiser
- Engine: 647 cubic centimetres (39.5 cu in) water-cooled DOHC 8-valve 90° V-twin Cylinder bore/stroke 81.5/62mm
- Top speed: 210 kilometres per hour (130 mph)
- Power: 72 horsepower (54 kW) carburetor version @9000RPM 75 horsepower (56 kW) EFI @9000RPM
- Torque: 61.2 newton-metres (45.1 lbf⋅ft)@7500RPM
- Transmission: 5-speed, belt drive
- Suspension: Front: 41mm upside-down forks, 130mm travel Rear: dual shocks, 90mm travel
- Brakes: Front: two 300 millimetres (12 in) disc brakes, two half-floating dual calipers Rear: single 230 millimetres (9.1 in) disc brake, half-floating dual caliper ABS optional in PRO version
- Tires: Front: 120/70-ZR 18 59W Rear: 180/55-ZR 17 73W
- Wheelbase: 1,665 millimetres (65.6 in)
- Dimensions: L: 2,430 millimetres (96 in); W: 840 millimetres (33 in); H: 1,150 millimetres (45 in)
- Seat height: 675 millimetres (26.6 in)
- Weight: 218 kilograms (481 lb) (dry); 232 kilograms (511 lb) 244 kilograms (538 lb) in running order (wet)
- Fuel capacity: 16 litres (3.5 imp gal; 4.2 US gal)
- Oil capacity: 3.2 litres (0.70 imp gal; 0.85 US gal) change w/filter 3.4 litres (0.75 imp gal; 0.90 US gal) total
- Related: Hyosung GV250

The Hyosung GV650 Aquila is a cruiser style motorcycle. Its V-twin engine is also found in the GT650R and GT650S sportbikes. The engine looks similar to the one found in the Suzuki SV650 by general layout, however sizes of practically all elements differ and the parts are not interchangeable.

== Model-specific features ==
GV650 has a belt drive, contrary to GT650 with which it shares an engine. Unlike the GT650, it has 5 speeds. In both cases, the rev limiter is at 10500RPM, but the GV650 has no rev counter.

By design, the motorcycle can be started with the kickstand down when its gear is in the neutral position.

The headlamp for all models is always turned on when the keys are turned, in accordance with US and Canadian DLR regulations.

US-distributed vehicles have factory-mounted passive orange light reflectors on the sides of the radiator cover and red reflectors on the sides of the rear registration plate.

It has two separate odometers as well as a total distance counter.

The motorcycle has no gear position indicator, however multi-position gear sensor is wired to the ECU in the EFI versions.

Carburetor (non-EFI) versions have a green LCD meter, EFI versions have a white LCD.

EFI versions display a motor fault (red FI error lamp on display) before starting the motor.

In EFI versions, ECU numeric error codes can be seen as a read-out instead of speed on the display meter, if one switches the (optional) diagnostic switch after starting the motor (keeping the switch on prevents it from starting the motor).

The fuel reserve is unusually high, at 5 litres (1.1 imp gal; 1.3 US gal) in a 16 litres (3.5 imp gal; 4.2 US gal) tank, and is indicated by 'fuel bar null and blinking' visual scheme which gives impression of having emergency of almost empty tank while in reality there is still about 80 kilometres (50 mi) more to go.

Fuel consumption averages 42MPG (US) or 5.6 L/100km but this includes mostly earlier carburetor based models, on the other hand, the data is based on typically longer US travel distances.
