= Hyosung GT125 =

Hyosung GT125 Comet
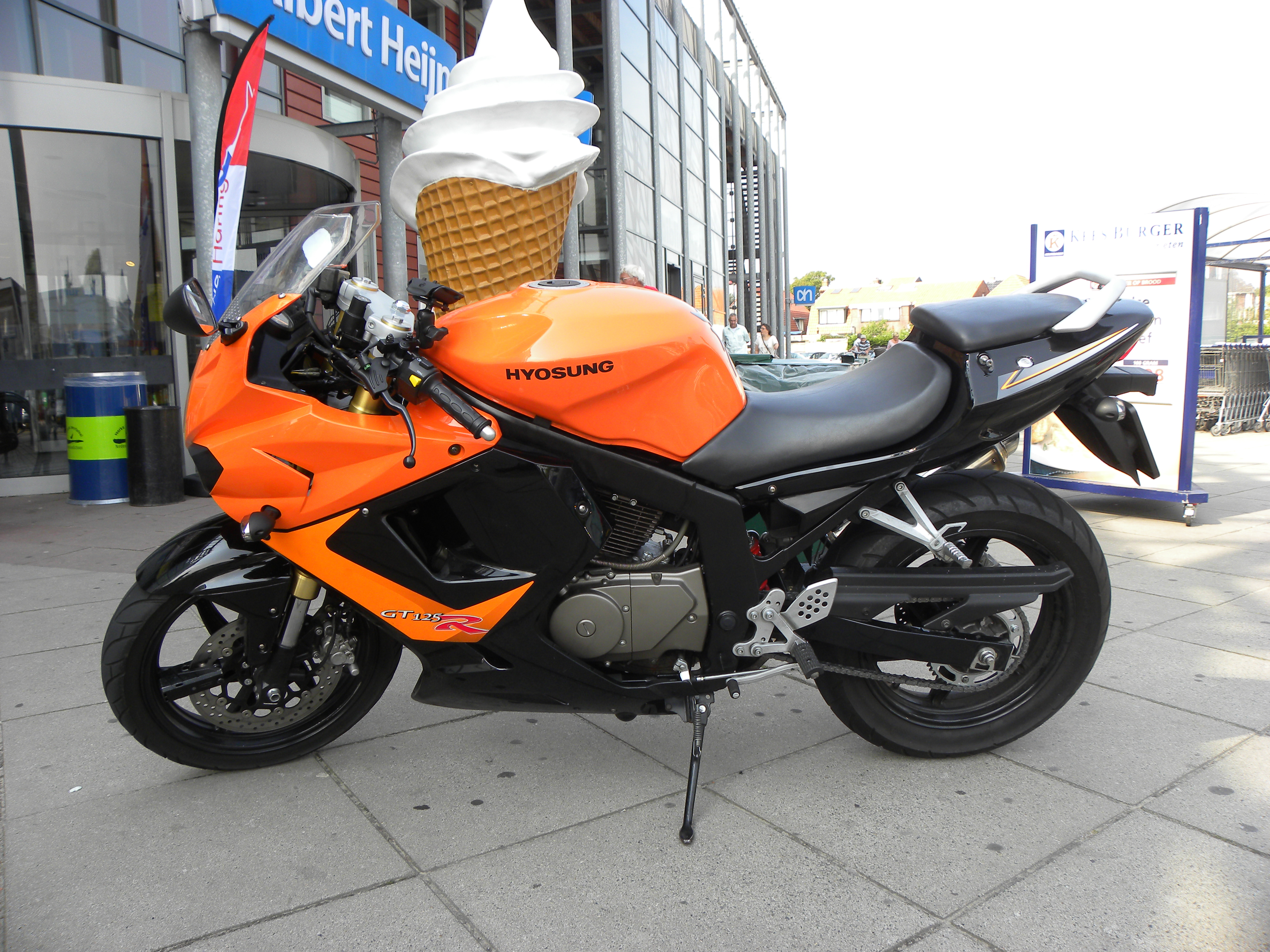
- Hyosung GT125R
- Manufacturer: Hyosung
- Also called: Comet GT125
- Production: 2001-2016
- Class: Naked
- Engine: 124 cc DOHC V-twin 75°, 8 valve oil cooled
- Bore / stroke: 44 mm × 41 mm (1.7 in × 1.6 in)
- Top speed: 75 mph - 120.7008 kmph
- Power: 14.2 hp (11 kW) @10,500 rpm
- Torque: 9.70 Nm (1.0 kgf-m or 7.2 ft.lbs) @10,000 rpm
- Transmission: chain
- Brakes: Front brakes: Single disc Front brakes diameter: 300 mm (11.8 inches); Rear brakes: Single disc Rear brakes diameter: 230 mm (9.1 inches)
- Tires: Front: 110/ 70-17 54H front Rear: 150/ 70-17 69H
- Wheelbase: 1,445 mm (56.9 in)
- Dimensions: L: 2,080 mm (82 in); W: 760 mm (30 in); H: 1,120 mm (44 in)
- Seat height: 795 mm (31.3 in)
- Weight: 166 kg (366 lb) (dry)
- Fuel capacity: 17 litres (4.5 US gal)
- Related: Hyosung Comet Series

The Hyosung GT125 is a 125 cc naked motorcycle produced from 2001 to 2016 by Hyosung Motors, a South Korean manufacturer. It was part of the Comet series, which also included 250 cc and 650 cc variants sharing a common V-twin engine architecture.

== Design ==
The GT125 was available in two body styles: a fully faired sports variant (GT125R) and an unfaired naked version (Comet). Both used a 124 cc DOHC V-twin engine based on Suzuki designs, mounted in the same chassis as the larger GT250, which resulted in a relatively high weight for the 125 cc class. According to Motorcycle News, the shared chassis made the GT125R "way above average for the budget 125cc class" in build quality, although it was heavier than typical 125 cc learner motorcycles.

== Accessories ==
It is very common for owners of this motorbike to tune the carburetor with a 'kit up' that usually costs around €100, and supposedly improves the air/gasoline mix situation at every regime, virtually erasing the engine's well-known lack of torque between 6,500 rpm and 10,500 rpm. This is true however, only for models until the year 2006, after which the engine's design was modified to erase this flaw. It is notorious that the problem still arises on the new models, but it can be dealt with by a proper tuning of the poppet valve's backlash every 6,000 kilometres (3,730 mi).
