= Hyosung Comet Series =

2007 Hyosung GT650S

The Hyosung Comet Series comprises a range of 125, 250, and 650 cc V-Twin engined recreational motorcycles. They are made in South Korea by Hyosung Motors & Machinery Inc. All models in the Comet series are designated by model codes in the form GTxxxs with xxx representing the approximate engine displacement in cubic centimetres, and R or S being optional suffixes designating the motorcycle style (full fairing and half fairing respectively, being the default a naked bike).

== Current Models ==
The Comet series range currently includes the models listed below.

- GT125
- GT250R, GT250
- GT650R, GT650S, GT650
