= Hyosung GV250 =

GV250
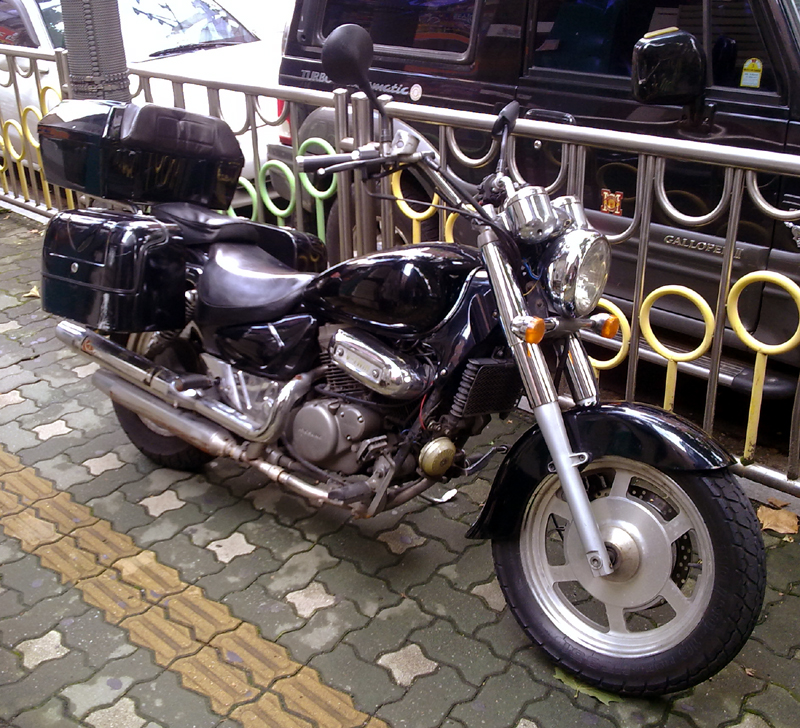
- Manufacturer: Hyosung (S&T Motors)
- Also called: AlphaSports GV250, Aquila GV250, S&T Motors Mirage 250
- Class: Cruiser
- Engine: 249 cc DOHC 4-valve V-twin, air/oil cooled Mikuni carburetor
- Top speed: 135 km/h
- Power: 28.5 hp
- Transmission: 5-speed, wet clutch
- Suspension: Front: 25 mm telescopic forks Rear: Dual shock
- Brakes: Front: single disc Rear: drum
- Tires: Front: 110/90-16 59S; Rear: 150/90-15 66S
- Wheelbase: 1,500 mm (59 in); Clearance: 155 mm (6.1 in)
- Dimensions: L: 2,270 mm (89 in); W: 800 mm (31 in); H: 1,090 mm (43 in)
- Seat height: 700 mm (28 in)
- Weight: 167 kg (368 lb) (dry); 176 kg (388 lb) (wet)
- Fuel capacity: 14 L (3.1 imp gal; 3.7 US gal)
- Related: Hyosung GV650

Hyosung GV250 is a 249 cc cruiser motorcycle manufactured by Hyosung Motors & Machinery Inc. The motorcycle's 2010 version produces 28.5 hp (21.3 kW).

The GV250 features the same electronic fuel injection (EFI) as the larger Hyosung GV650. Its 4-stroke, 4-valve, double overhead cam engine is air- and oil-cooled. Atk also had rebadged versions of all .

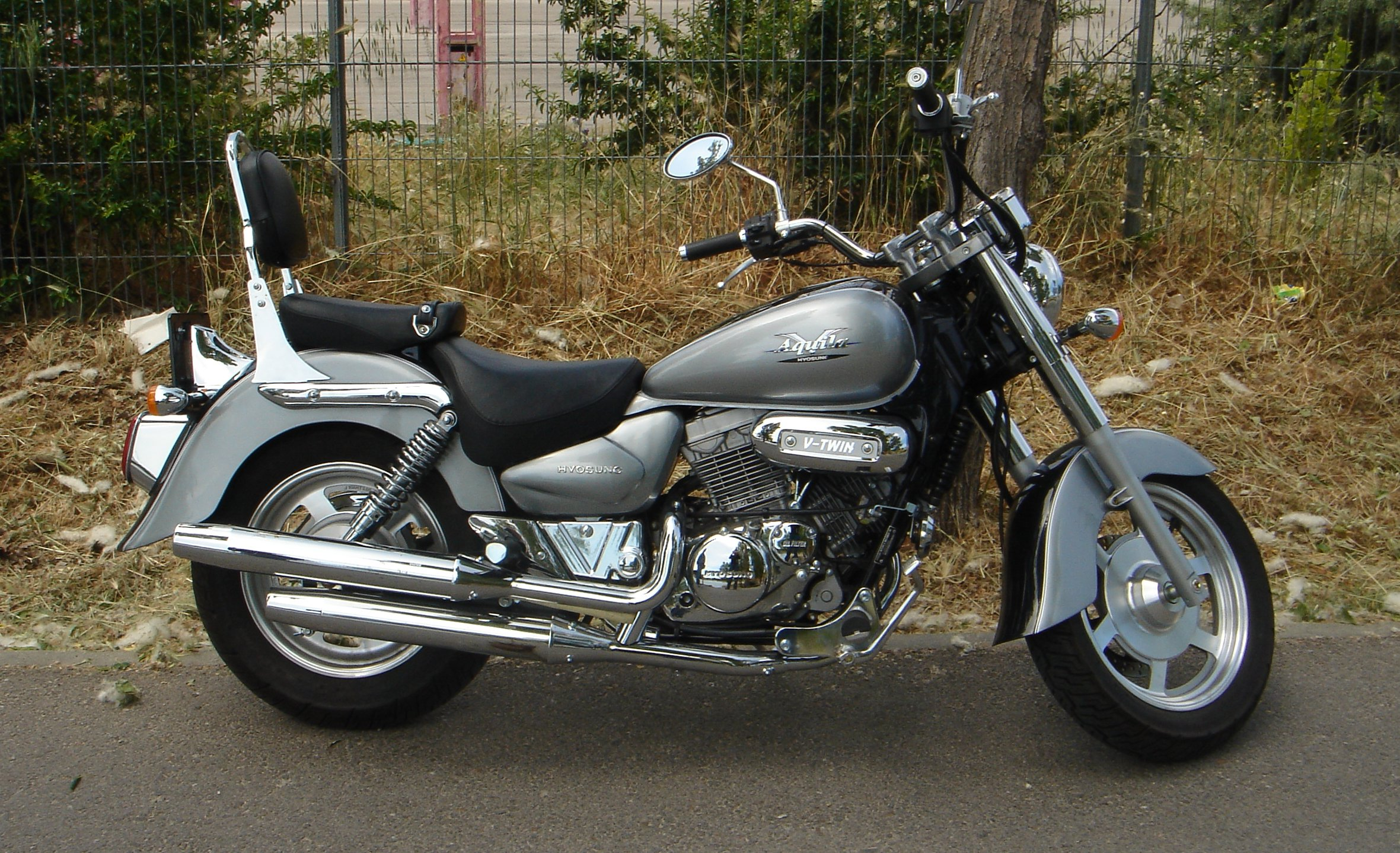

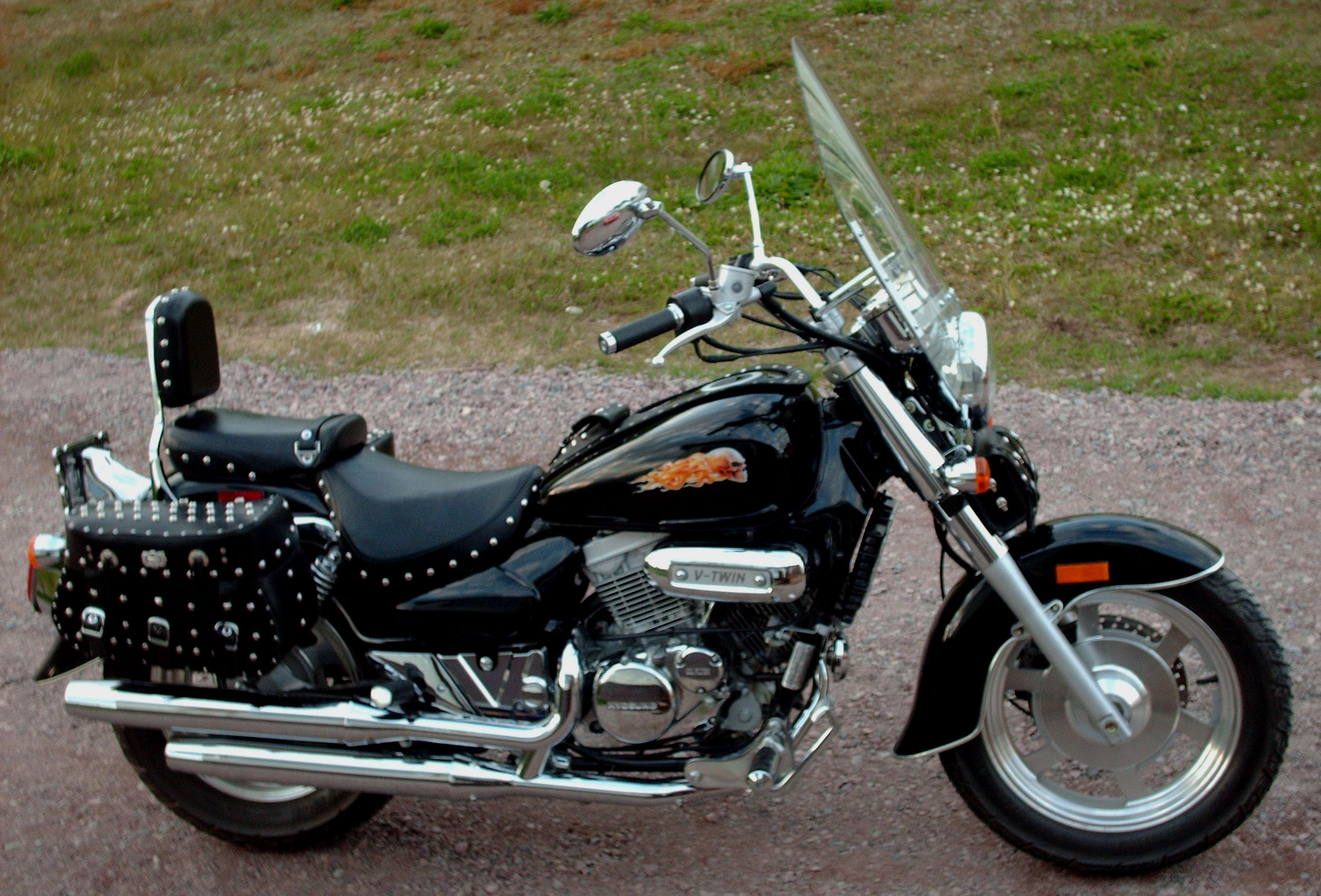
