= Hyosung Exceed =

Motor scooter

The Hyosung MS1 125 Exceed is a motor scooter equipped with an air cooled, single cylinder, four-stroke, 124cc engine which could develop 11 horsepower at 8500rpm. It was first manufactured in 2004.

== Technical details ==
Cooling system:: Air
Gearbox: 5-speed.
Dry weight: 130.0 kg (286.6 pounds)
Overall height: 1,140 mm (44.9 inches)
Overall length: 1,885 mm (74.2 inches)
Overall width: 655 mm (25.8 inches)
Wheelbase: 1,360 mm (53.5 inches)
Fuel capacity: 7.00 litres (1.85 gallons)
