= Suzuki DR125 =

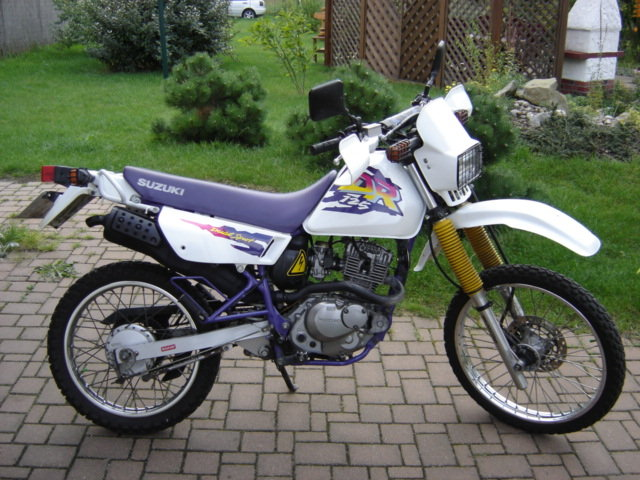
- Manufacturer: Suzuki Motor Company
- Production: Early 1980s into late 1990s
- Class: Dual-sport
- Engine: 124 cc (7.6 cu in), four-stroke, single
- Top speed: 65 mph
- Power: 12 bhp @ 9500 rpm
- Seat height: 820 mm (32 in)

The Suzuki DR125 is a 124 cc (7.6 cu in) four-stroke motorcycle manufactured by Suzuki.

More comprehensive information available on equivalent pages in French and German: French: Suzuki DR 125 and German: Suzuki DR 125.
