= Hyosung GD250N =

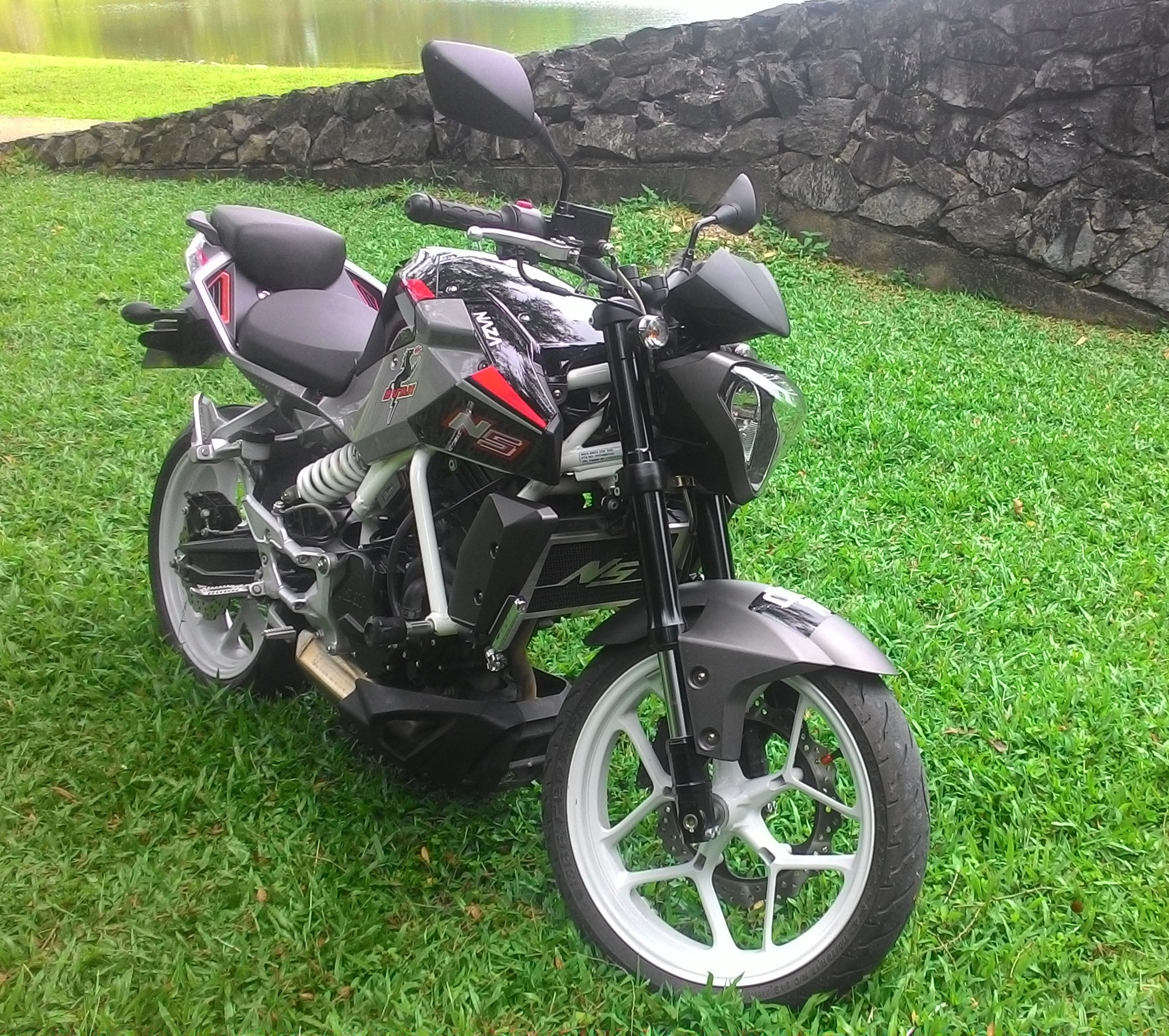
- Engine: 249 cc (15.2 cu in) liquid cooled DOHC 4-valve single
- Bore / stroke: 73 mm × 59.6 mm (2.87 in × 2.35 in)
- Compression ratio: 12:1
- Transmission: Multiplate wet clutch, 6-speed, chain drive
- Frame type: Steel trellis
- Suspension: Front: telescopic fork Rear:Swingarm, preload adjustable
- Brakes: Front: 4 piston caliper, 300 mm disc, 4 piston caliper Rear: 2 piston caliper, 230 mm disc
- Tires: Front:110/70/R17; Rear: 150/60/R17
- Rake, trail: 93.6 mm (3.69 in), 23.5°
- Wheelbase: 1,340 mm (53 in)
- Dimensions: L: 1,937 mm (76.3 in); W: 800 mm (31 in); H: 1,055 mm (41.5 in)

The Hyosung GD250N (Naza N5 in Malaysia) is a 250 cc (15 cu in) naked sportbike made by KR Motors of South Korea and Naza of Malaysia. The GD250R is a variant of the GD250N that contains the same chassis and engine within a trellis frame, which increases the bike's overall weight by 50 pounds.

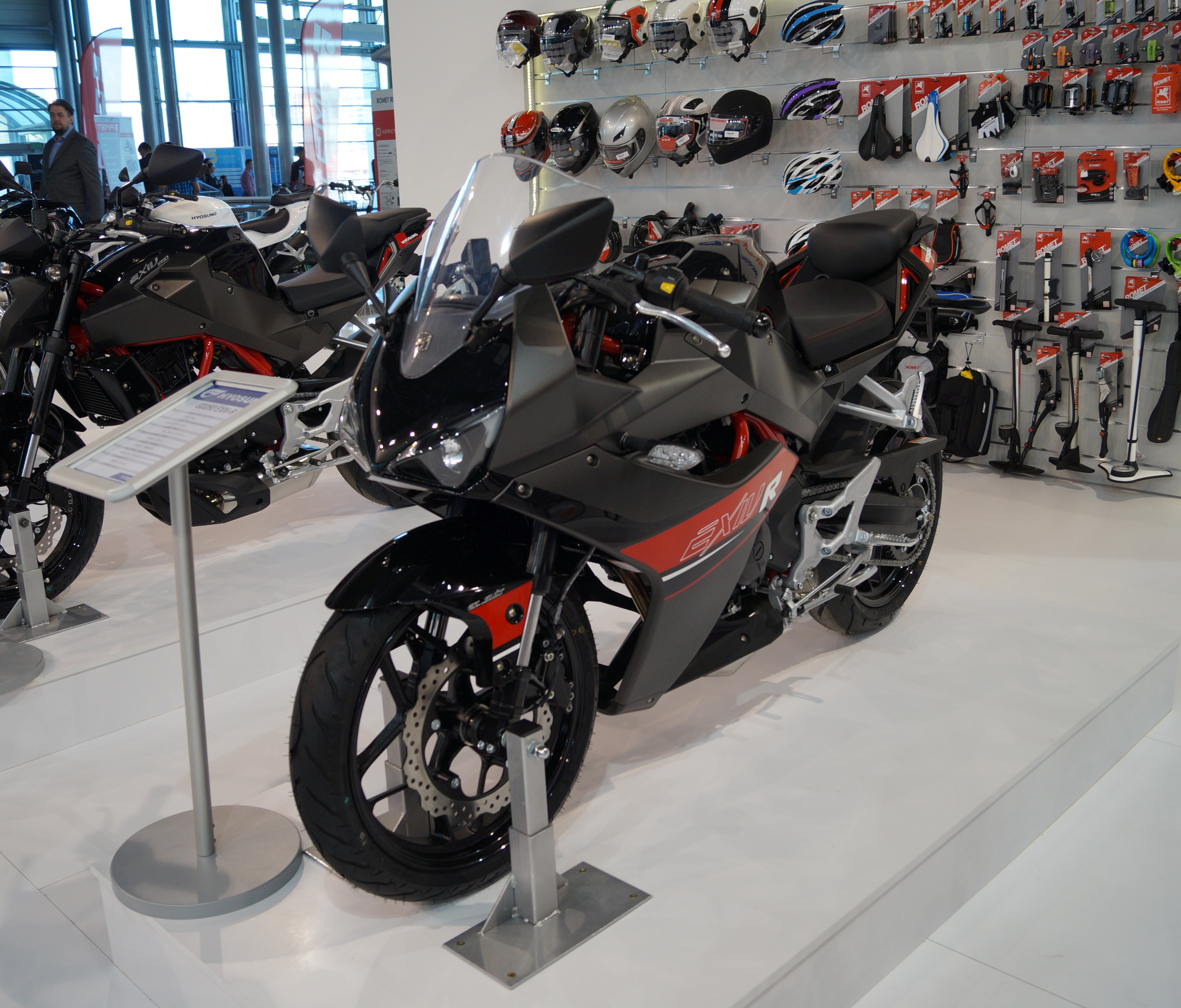
Hyosung GD250R

The riding position of the GD250N lies between that of a standard bike and a sport bike.
