= Hyosung GT650 =

GT650
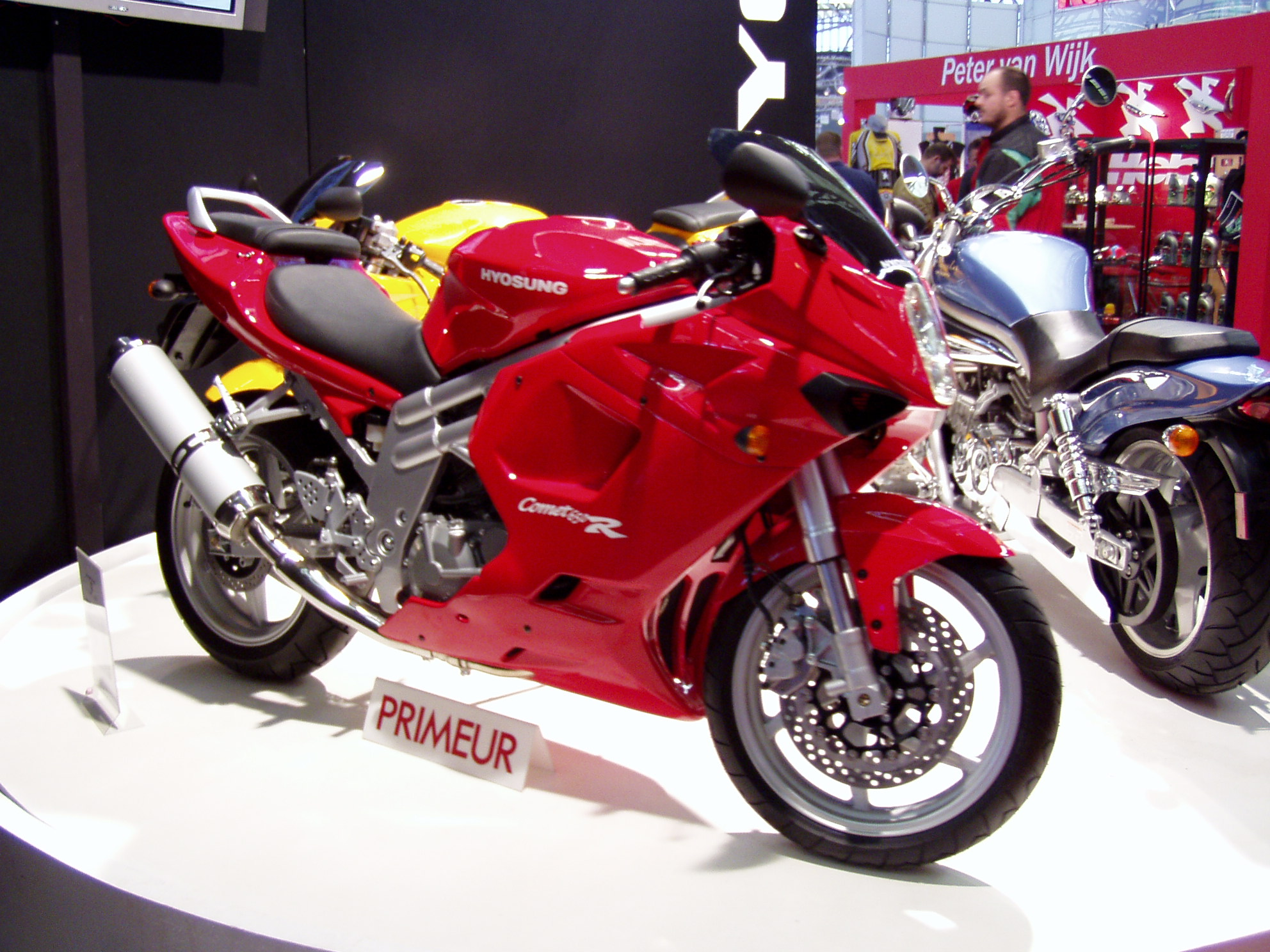
- Manufacturer: Hyosung
- Also called: Comet GT650
- Engine: 647 cc carbureted 4-stroke, water-cooled DOHC 8-valve 90° V-twin
- Bore / stroke: 81.5 mm × 62 mm (3.21 in × 2.44 in)
- Top speed: 136 mph (219 km/h)
- Power: 79.0 hp (58.9 kW) @9,000 rpm (claimed); 65.4 hp (48.8 kW) (rear wheel)
- Torque: 42.9 lb⋅ft (58.2 N⋅m) (rear wheel)
- Transmission: 6-speed, wet clutch
- Brakes: Front: dual disc Rear: disc
- Tires: Front: 120/60-ZR 17 55W; Rear: 160/60-ZR 17 69W
- Wheelbase: 1,435 mm (56.5 in)
- Dimensions: L: 2,060 mm (81 in); W: 655 mm (25.8 in); H: 1,125 mm (44.3 in)
- Seat height: 785 mm (30.9 in)
- Weight: 208–210 kg (459–463 lb) (dry)
- Fuel capacity: 17 litres (4.5 US gal)
- Related: Hyosung Comet Series

The Hyosung GT650 Comet is a motorcycle manufactured by Hyosung Motors & Machinery Inc. It is available in naked (GT650), half-fairing (GT650S), and full-fairing (GT650R) variants.

Cycle World recorded a tested 0-60mph time of 4.2 sec. and a 1/4 mile time of 12.84 sec. @ 102.22 mph.
