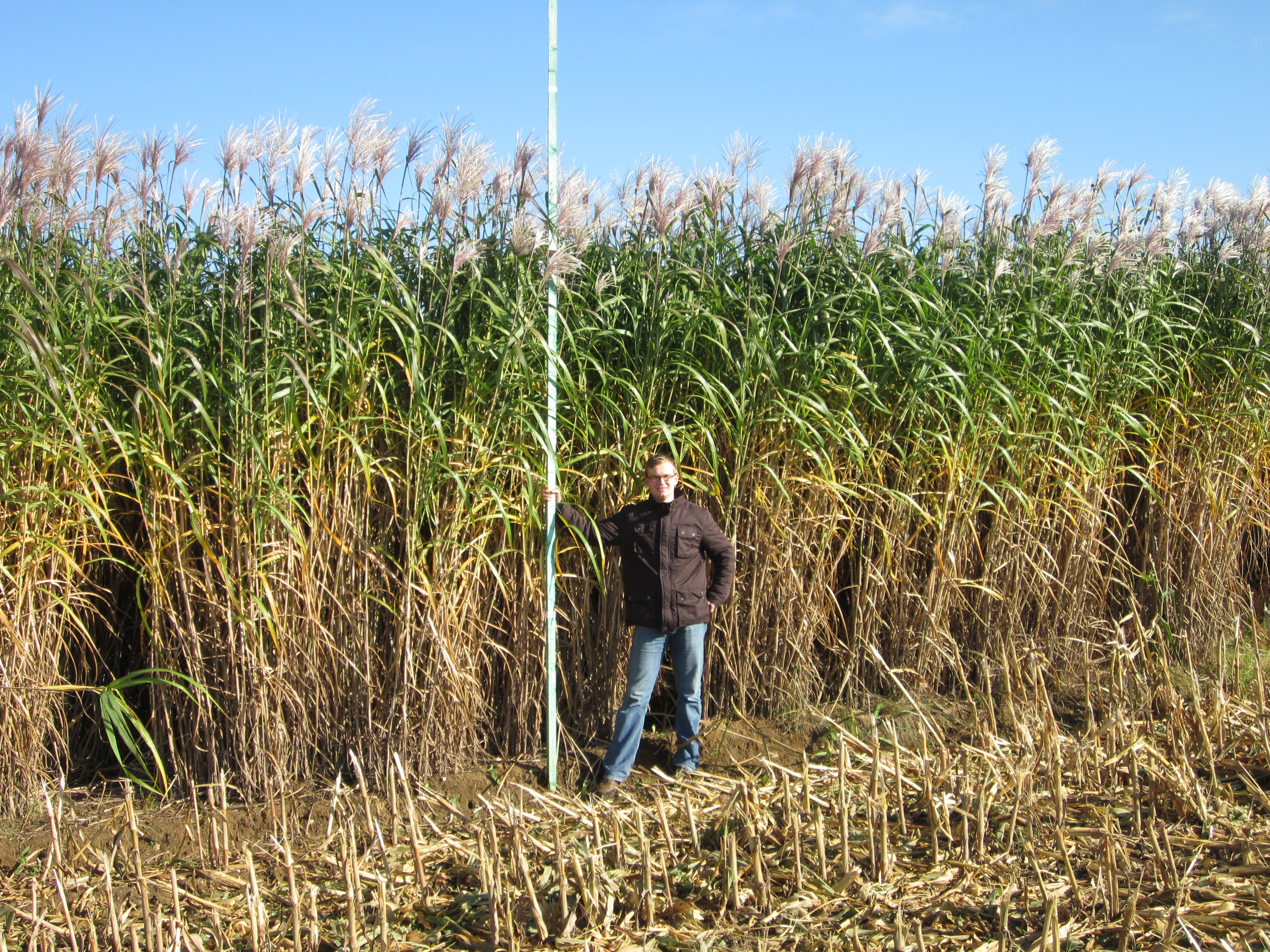

Scientific classification
- Kingdom: Plantae
- Clade: Tracheophytes
- Clade: Angiosperms
- Clade: Monocots
- Clade: Commelinids
- Order: Poales
- Family: Poaceae
- Subfamily: Panicoideae
- Genus: Miscanthus
- Species: M. × giganteus

Binomial name
- Miscanthus × giganteus J.M.Greef, Deuter ex Hodk., Renvoize 2001

Synonyms (Note: Based on Kew/POWO list. Note that the POWO's accepted name is M. × longiberbis, with an estimated plant height of only 0.7 to 1.2 meters."Miscanthus × longiberbis (Hack.) Nakai". Plants of the World Online..) (Note: "M. x giganteus is a highly productive, sterile, rhizomatous C4 perennial grass that was collected in Yokahama, Japan in 1935 by Aksel Olsen. It was taken to Denmark where it was cultivated and spread throughout Europe and into North America for planting in horticultural settings. Over time, it has been known as Miscanthus sinensis ‘Giganteus’, M. giganteus, Miscanthus ogiformis Honda, and Miscanthus sacchariflorus var. brevibarbis (Honda) Adati. Recent classification work at the Royal Botanic Gardens at Kew, England has designated it as M. x giganteus (Greef & Deuter ex Hodkinson & Renvoize), a hybrid of M. sinensis Anderss. and M. sacchariflorus (Maxim.) Hack." Anderson et al. 2014, p. 71.)
- Miscanthus × changii Y.N.Lee; Miscanthus × latissimus Y.N.Lee; Miscanthus × longiberbis (Hack.) Nakai; Miscanthus × longiberbis var. changii (Y.N.Lee) Ibaragi & H.Ohashi; Miscanthus × longiberbis f. ogiformis (Honda) Ibaragi; Miscanthus matsumurae var. longiberbis Hack.; Miscanthus × ogiformis Honda; Miscanthus oligostachyus subsp. longiberbis (Hack.) T.Koyama; Miscanthus sacchariflorus var. brevibarbis (Honda) Adati; Miscanthus sinensis 'Giganteus'

= Miscanthus × giganteus =

Species of grass

Miscanthus × giganteus, also known as the giant miscanthus, is a sterile hybrid of Miscanthus sinensis and Miscanthus sacchariflorus. It is a perennial grass with bamboo-like stems that can grow to heights of 3–4 metres (13 ft) in one season (from the third season onwards). (Note: It takes between two and four years to reach ceiling yield; "[...] cooler northern sites still require three to four years, while southern sites normally reach a ceiling in two years." Jones 2019, p. 22.) Just like Pennisetum purpureum, Arundo donax and Saccharum ravennae, it is also called elephant grass.

Miscanthus × giganteus' perennial nature, its ability to grow on marginal land, its water efficiency, non-invasiveness, low fertilizer needs, significant carbon sequestration and high yield have sparked significant interest among researchers, (Note: "In contrast to annual crops, bioenergy from dedicated perennial crops is widely perceived to have lower life‐cycle GHG emissions and other environmental cobenefits. Perennial crops such as Miscanthus and short‐rotation coppice (SRC) willow and poplar have low nitrogen input requirements (with benefits for N2O emissions and water quality), can sequester soil carbon due to reduced tillage and increased belowground biomass allocation, and can be economically viable on marginal and degraded land, thus minimizing competition with other agricultural activities and avoiding iLUC effects." Whitaker et al. 2018, p. 151.) with some arguing that it has "ideal" energy crop properties. (Note: "Ideal biomass energy crops efficiently use available resources, are perennial, store carbon in the soil, have high water-use efficiency, are not invasive and have low fertilizer requirements. One grass that possesses all of these characteristics, as well as producing large amounts of biomass, is Miscanthus x giganteus." Anderson et al. 2014, p. 71.) Some argue that it can provide negative emissions, while others highlight its water cleaning and soil enhancing qualities. There are practical and economic challenges related to its use in the existing, fossil based combustion infrastructure, however. Torrefaction and other fuel upgrading techniques are being explored as countermeasures to this problem.

== Use areas ==
Miscanthus × giganteus is mainly used as raw material for solid biofuels. It can be burned directly, or processed further into pellets or briquettes. It can also be used as raw material for liquid biofuels or biogas.

Alternatively, it is also possible to use miscanthus as a building material, and as insulation. (Note: Lewandowski et al. argue that the "[...] fossil-energy savings are highest where miscanthus biomass is used as construction material (our analysis uses the example of insulation material)." Lewandowski et al. 2016, p. 20.) Materials produced from miscanthus include fiberboards, composite miscanthus/wood particleboards, and blocks. It can be used as raw material for pulp and fibers as well as molded products such as eco-friendly disposable plates, cups, cartons, etc. The pulp can be processed further into methylcellulose and used as a food additive and in many industrial applications. Miscanthus fiber provides raw material for reinforcement of biocomposite or synthetic materials. In agriculture, miscanthus straw is used in soil mulching to retain soil moisture, inhibit weed growth, and prevent erosion. Further, miscanthus' high carbon to nitrogen ratio makes it inhospitable to many microbes, creating a clean bedding for poultry, cattle, pigs, horses, and companion animals. Miscanthus used as horse bedding can be combined with making organic fertilizer. Miscanthus can also be used as a fiber source in pet food.

== Life circle ==
=== Propagation ===
Miscanthus × giganteus is propagated by cutting the rhizomes (its below-ground stems) into small pieces, and then re-planting those pieces 10 cm (4 in) below ground. One hectare (2.5 acres) of miscanthus rhizomes, cut into pieces, can be used to plant 10–30 hectares of new miscanthus fields (multiplication factor 10–30). (Note: "Producing rhizomes for propagation in the United Kingdom climate takes at least two growing season, this entails clearing the production ground of weeds, plowing in spring and tilling the ground to a fine seed bed like tilth before planting the rhizomes with a potato type planter. [...] In the spring following the second growth year, the rhizomes are harvested using a modified potato harvester, hand or semi-automatically sorted and cut into viable pieces, 20–40 g. [...] One ha of rhizomes produces enough material to plant 10–30 ha of crop with the same modified potato type planter. Lower quality rhizomes, tested by sprouting tests, would require 80–90 g rhizomes (private communication, M. Mos)." Hastings et al. 2017, pp. 5–6.) Rhizome propagation is a labor-intensive way of planting new crops, but only happens once during a crop's lifetime. Alternative propagation techniques are available, or in development (Note: "Our work is showing, depending on the hybrid type, one ha (hectare) of seed production can produce enough seed for ~1000–2000 ha of planting, depending on parental combinations, two orders of magnitude greater than rhizome propagation. [...] [A]n 85–95% establishment rate is achieved." Hastings et al. 2017, p. 6.) (Note: "Seeds are sown by machine and raised in the greenhouse (Figure 3A) before being planted out in the field (Figure 3B). It is anticipated that seed-based establishment methods will prove most effective for the scaling up of miscanthus production because they have the following advantages: · With increasing market demand, large quantities can easily be provided, once seed production has been well developed · Short growing period for plantlets: Only 8–10 weeks from seed to final product (plugs) · Plug production is energy efficient (no need for refrigerators) · Low establishment costs" Lewandowski et al. 2016, p. 15.) such as nodal propagation. (Note: "Miscanthus crops can be established from stem nodal propagation by harvesting stems in September and sowing them immediately into a field without any need for cold storage which, in any case reduces establishment viability while increasing cost. Planted stems produce shoots and roots and, subsequently, a rhizome system." O'Loughlin, McDonnell & Finnan 2017, p. 345.) For seed based propagation, a halving of the cost is predicted. (Note: "Results show that new hybrid seed propagation significantly reduces establishment cost to below £900 ha^{−1} [...]. The breakeven yield was calculated to be 6 Mg [Mg/megagram equals metric ton] DM [dry matter] ha^{−1} y^{−1} [hectare per year], which is about half average United Kingdom yield for Mxg; with newer seeded hybrids reaching 16 Mg DM ha^{−1} in second year United Kingdom trials. These combined improvements will significantly increase crop profitability. The trade-offs between costs of production for the preparation of different feedstock formats show that bales are the best option for direct firing with the lowest transport costs (£0.04 Mg^{−1} km^{−1}) and easy on-farm storage. However, if pelleted fuel is required then chip harvesting is more economic. [...] The specific cost of rhizome and plug planting are similar as they are relatively labor intensive whereas seed drilling, is predicted to halve the cost." Hastings et al. 2017, pp. 1, 8.)

=== Management ===
The plant requires little if any herbicide, and only at the beginning of its first two seasons. Afterwards the dense canopy and the mulch formed by dead leaves effectively reduces weed growth. Because of miscanthus' high nitrogen use efficiency, (Note: "C4 species characteristically demonstrate improved efficiency in nitrogen (N) and water-use [28,29]. Specifically, C4 species can show N-use efficiencies twice those of C3 species." Anderson et al. 2014, p. 73.) fertilizer is also usually not needed. (Note: "Nitrogen fertilizer is unnecessary and can be detrimental to sustainability, unless planted into low fertility soils where early establishment will benefit from additions of around 50 kg N ha^{−1}. [...] N2O emissions can be five times lower under unfertilized Miscanthus than annual crops, and up to 100 times lower than intensive pasture land. Inappropriate nitrogen fertilizer additions can result in significant increases in N2O emission from Miscanthus plantations, exceeding IPCC emission factors although these are still offset by potential fossil fuel replacement." McCalmont et al. 2017, p. 503.) Mulch film, on the other hand, helps both M. x giganteus and various seed based hybrids to grow faster and taller, with a larger number of stems per plant, effectively reducing the establishment phase from three years to two. (Note: "Plastic mulch film reduced establishment time, improving crop economics. [...] The mulch film trial in Aberystwyth showed a significant (P < 0.05) difference between establishment rates for varying plant densities with the cumulative first 2-year mean yield almost doubling under film as shown in Table 3. Using film adds £100 per ha and 220 kg CO2 eq. C ha^{−1}, to the cost of establishment. The effect of this increase is to reduce the establishment period of the crop by 1 year in Aberystwyth environmental conditions, similar reduction in establishment times were observed at the other trial sites and also in Ireland (O’Loughlin et al., 2017). [...] With mulch film agronomy the latest seeded hybrids establish far more quickly with significantly higher early yields (years 1 and 2) compared to commercial Mxg in the United Kingdom delivering a breakeven return on investment at least a year earlier." Hastings et al. 2017, pp. 1, 9, 14–15.) The reason seems to be that this plastic film keeps the humidity in the topsoil and increases the temperature. (Note: "The planting of seed-derived plugs proved to be most successful method for miscanthus establishment on marginal soils. Covering the plants with a plastic film accelerates their growth. The film keeps the humidity in the topsoil and increases the temperature. This is beneficial for the plants, especially on light soils with a higher risk for drought stress and in cool temperatures." Lewandowski et al. 2016, p. 14.)

=== Yield ===
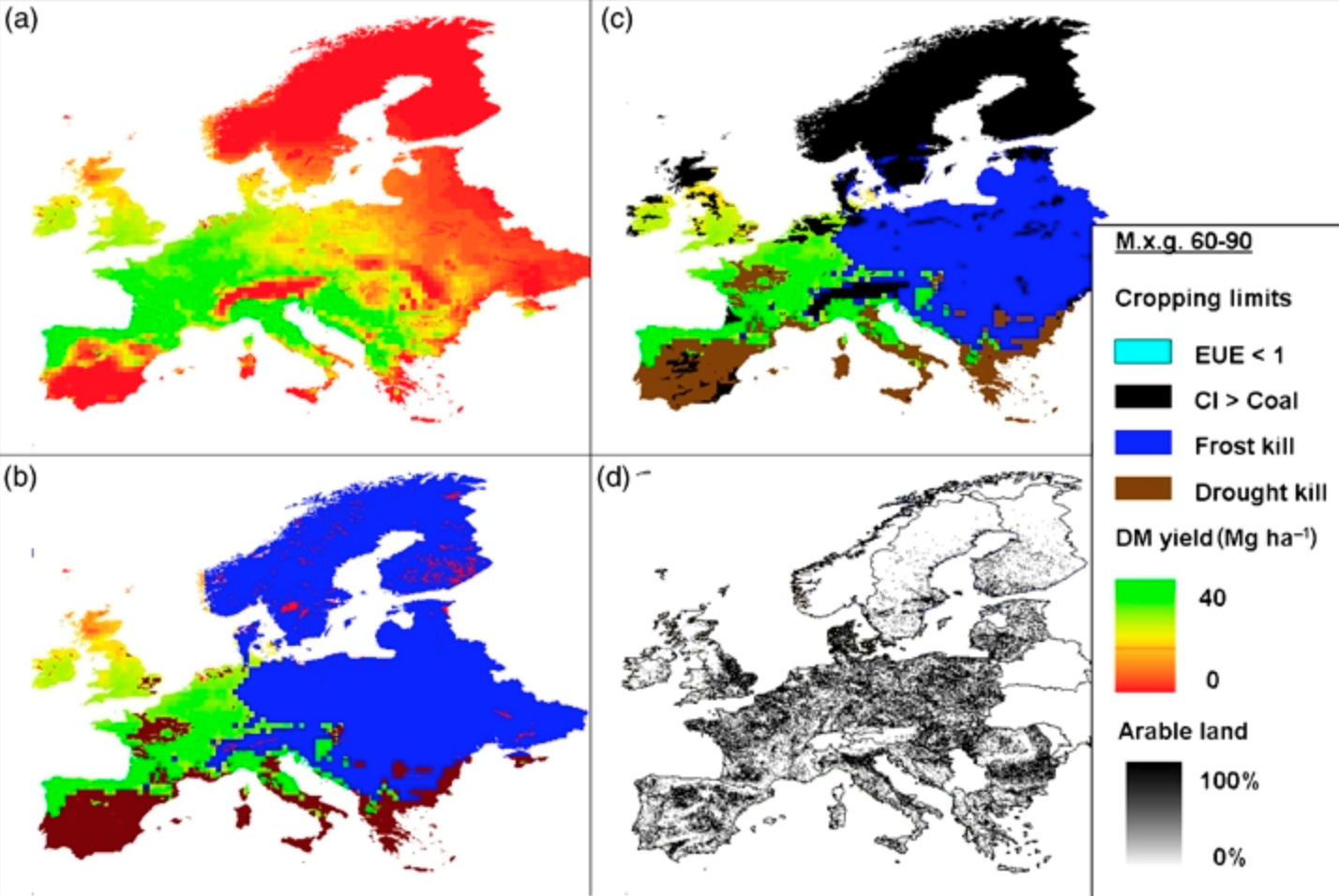
Computer modelled yield estimate for Miscanthus x giganteus in Europe (no irrigation).

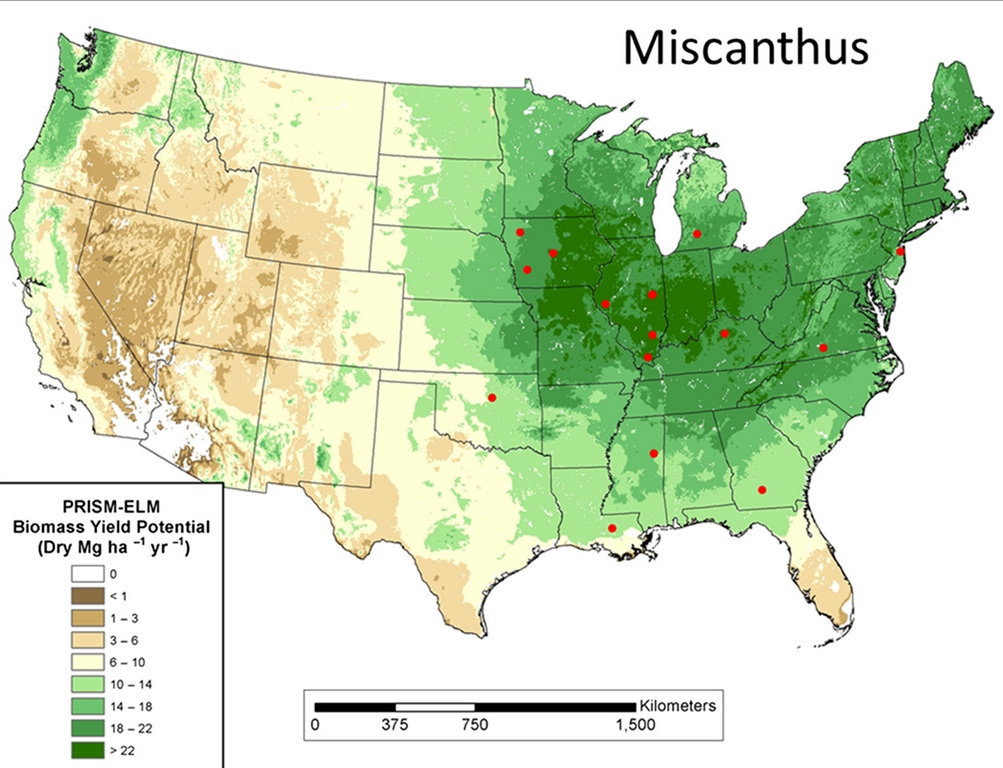
Computer modelled yield estimate for Miscanthus × giganteus in the USA (average based on all soil types). For a map with 2–4 times higher yield estimates see Miguez et al. (figure 3). Here uneconomical soil types (below 10 t/ha) are excluded from the calculation.

Miscanthus is unusually efficient at turning solar radiation into biomass, (Note: "Crop productivity is determined as the product of total solar radiation incident on an area of land, and the efficiencies of interception, conversion and partitioning of that sunlight energy into plant biomass. [...] Beale and Long demonstrated in field trials in southeastern England that εc,a was 0.050–0.060, 39% above the maximum value observed in C3 species. Furthermore, when εc is calculated in terms of total (i.e., above-ground and below-ground) M. x giganteus biomass production (εc,t), it reaches 0.078, which approaches theoretical maximum of 0.1. Studies performed in the midwestern USA by Heaton et al. reported a similar efficiency of intercepted PAR (0.075)." Anderson et al. 2014, p. 73.) and its water use efficiency is among the highest of any crop. (Note: "– Water‐use efficiency is among the highest of any crop, in the range of 7.8–9.2 g DM (kg H2O)^{−1}. – Overall, water demand will increase due to high biomass productivity and increased evapotranspiration at the canopy level (e.g. ET up from wheat by 100–120 mm yr^{−1}). – Improved soil structures mean greater water‐holding capacity (e.g. up by 100–150 mm), although soils may still be drier in drought years. – Reduced run‐off in wetter years, aiding flood mitigation and reducing soil erosion. – Drainage water quality is improved, and nitrate leaching is significantly lower than arable (e.g. 1.5–6.6 kg N ha^{−1} yr^{−1} [for] Miscanthus, 34.2–45.9 [for] maize/soya bean)." McCalmont et al. 2017, p. 504.) It has twice the water use efficiency of its fellow C4 plant maize, twice the efficiency as the C3 energy crop willow (Salix viminalis), and four times the efficiency as the C3 plant wheat. (Note: "Beale et al. (1999) compared their results to the water‐use efficiency of a C3 biomass crop, Salix viminalis, reported in Lindroth et al. (1994) and Lindroth & Cienciala (1996), and suggest that WUE for Miscanthus could be around twice that of this willow species. Clifton‐Brown & Lewondowski (2000) reported figures from 11.5 to 14.2 g total (above‐ and belowground) DM (kg H2O)^{−1} for various Miscanthus genotypes in pot trials, and this compares to figures calculated by Ehdaie & Waines (1993) with seven wheat cultivars who found WUE between 2.67 and 3.95 g total DM (kg H2O)^{−1}. Converting these Miscanthus values to dry matter biomass per hectare of cropland would see ratios of biomass to water use in the range of to 78–92 kg DM ha^{−1} (mm H2O)^{−1}. Richter et al. (2008) modelled harvestable yield potentials for Miscanthus from 14 UK field trials and found soil water available to plants was the most significant factor in yield prediction, and they calculated a DM yield to soil available water ratio at 55 kg DM ha^{−1} (mm H2O)^{−1}, while just 13 kg DM ha^{−1} was produced for each 1 mm of incoming precipitation, likely related to the high level of canopy interception and evaporation. Even by C4 standards these efficiencies are high, as seen in comparisons to field measurements averaging 27.5 ± 0.4 kg aboveground DM ha^{−1} (mm H2O)^{−1} for maize (Tolk et al., 1998)." McCalmont et al. 2017, p. 501.) The typical UK winter harvest of 11–14 tonnes dry mass per hectare (1.1–1.4 kilograms per square metre (0.23–0.29 lb/sq ft)) produces 200–250 GJ/ha (22,000–28,000 kWh/acre) of energy per year. This compares favorably to maize (98 GJ/ha), oil seed rape (25 GJ/ha), and wheat/sugar beet (7–15 GJ/ha). (Note: "In terms of energy production intensity, Miscanthus biomass produces more net energy per hectare than other bioenergy crops at around 200 GJ ha^{−1} yr^{−1}, especially arable [maize for biogas 98, oil seed rape for biodiesel 25, wheat and sugar beet ethanol 7–15 (Hastings et al., 2012)]. Felten et al. (2013) calculated similar figures, reporting 254 GJ ha^{−1} yr^{−1} for Miscanthus." McCalmont et al. 2017, p. 493.) In the USA, M. × giganteus has been shown to yield two times more than switchgrass.

In many locations in Europe, miscanthus plantations produce more net energy than any competing energy crop, because of high yields and low demands for farm management energy use. (Note: Hastings et al. write that «[f]ield trials have shown that for many locations in Europe M. x giganteus has the largest energy yield of all potential bioenergy crops in terms of net MJ ha ^{−1} [megajoule per hectare], and the highest energy‐use efficiency (EUE), in terms of the energy cost of production, due to its relatively high yields and low inputs [...]». Hastings et al. 2009a, p. 180.) The main competitors yieldwise are willow and poplar, grown at short rotation coppice (SRC) or short rotation forestry (SRF) plantations. In the northern parts of Europe, willow and poplar approach and sometimes exceed miscanthus winter yields in the same location. (Note: SRF yield for willow and poplar in the UK lies in the range of 10–12 tonnes dry matter per hectare per year according to Proe, Griffiths & Craig 2002, pp. 322–323. In a willow yield meta study Fabio et al. quote willow trials in Sweden yielding 8, 13 and 14 tonnes. In the UK, the authors quote two willow trials, both yielding 10 tonnes, and one trial in Ireland yielding 8–10 tonnes. See Fabio & Smart 2018 table 1 and 2, page 551 and 552. The willow yield datapoints (location not given) in Figure 2, p. 554 show a mean yield of approximately 6–7 tonnes per hectare per year. In table 3, page 557, 6 studies is quoted, with a mean yield of 10 tonnes per hectare per year. Aylott et al. collected data from 49 test sites for willow and poplar in the UK, and conclude: "Field trial results shown that observed SRC yield varied significantly between genotype and rotation (Table 1). The highest yields were recorded in willow over the two rotations, with the 16 genotypes averaging 9.0 odt [oven dry tonne] ha^{−1} yr^{−1} compared with 6.3 odt ha^{−1} yr^{−1} for the poplar genotypes. The highest‐yielding parental line was the Swedish S. vimanlis × S. schwerinii, which displayed consistently high yields over both rotations and a high resistance to rust. This parent line included the highest‐yielding single genotype, Tora, with an average yield across both rotations of 11.3 odt ha^{−1} yr^{−1}." Aylott et al. 2008, p. 363. Modelling for the future, Aust et al. estimate a mean yield of 14 tonnes for SRC willow and poplar produced on arable land in Germany, see Aust et al. 2014, p. 529. Willow and poplar need fertilizer to achieve these yields, Fabio et al. reports 92–400 kg nitrogen per hectare per year for the yields reported in their article. See Fabio & Smart 2018, pp. 551–552. Hastings et al. used computer modelling software to estimate miscanthus, willow and poplar yields for Great Britain, and concluded with mean yields in the narrow range 8.1 to 10.6 dry tonnes per hectare per year for all these plants, with miscanthus taking the middle position. Miscanthus had the highest yield in the warmer southwest, and adjusting the computer model for the expected warmer climate in 2050 made miscanthus the top yielding crop for a larger area: "As the climate warms through the time‐slices, there is a yield increase and thus a larger area where Miscanthus is the highest yielder of the feed‐stocks considered." Hastings et al. 2014, pp. 108, 119.) Globally, FAO estimates that forest plantation yields range from 0.4 to 12.2 tonnes per hectare (0.16 to 4.86 long ton/acre; 0.18 to 5.44 short ton/acre) dry mass per year. Russian pine have the lowest yield (0.4–2 t/ha), while eucalyptus in Argentina, Brazil, Chile and Uruguay, and poplar in France/Italy, have the highest, with 7.8–12.2 t/ha for eucalyptus and 2.7–8.4 t/ha for poplar. (Note: For yield estimates see FAO's "The global outlook for future wood supply from forest plantations", section 2.7.2 – 2.7.3. FAO provide yield estimates in cubic meters (m^{3}); 1 to 25 m^{3} globally. Cubic meters converted to dry tonnes based on the following data: Scot's pine, native to Europe and northern Asia, weighs 390 kg/m^{3} oven dry (moisture content 0%). The oven dry weight of eucalyptus species commonly grown in plantations in South America is 487 kg/m^{3} (average of Lyptus, Rose Gum and Deglupta). The average weight of poplar species commonly grown in plantations in Europe is 335 kg/m^{3} (average of White Poplar and Black Poplar.) IPCC estimates that global plantation forest yields (before harvest losses) varies between 0.4 and 25 tonnes, with most plantations producing between 5 and 15 tonnes. Natural forests have lower yields however, between 0.1 and 9.3 dry tonnes per hectare per year, with most natural forests producing between 1 and 4 tonnes. The average yield for natural forests in temperate climates is 1.5 to 2 dry tonnes per hectare per year before harvest related losses. (Note: To be exact, net annual increment (NAI) for mixed temperate natural forest is (2–2,5 m^{3} per hectare, ranging from 0.9 m3 in Greece to 6 m^{3} in France). Cubic meters converted to dry tonnes based on the following data: Scot's pine, native to Europe and northern Asia, weighs 390 kg/m^{3} oven dry (moisture content 0%). The oven dry weight of eucalyptus species commonly grown in plantations in South America is 487 kg/m^{3} (average of Lyptus, Rose Gum and Deglupta). The average weight of poplar species commonly grown in plantations in Europe is 335 kg/m^{3} (average of White Poplar and Black Poplar. Smil 2008, pp. 75–76.)

The miscanthus peak yield is reached at the end of summer but harvest is typically delayed until winter or early spring. Yield is roughly one third lower at this point because of the shedding of leaves, but the combustion quality is higher (due to lower amounts of moisture and chlorine in the biomass). Delayed harvest also allows nitrogen to move back into the rhizome for use by the plant in the following growing season. (Note: Miscanthus yield software Miscanfor calculates a yield decline of 33% between autumn peak and winter harvest. See Hastings et al. 2009a, p. 186. This calculation is confirmed by Roncucci et al. which found a dry mass yield decrease of 32–38% for their test crops when harvest was delayed until winter. See Roncucci et al. 2015, p. 1002. Clifton-Brown et al. found a mean yield reduction of 0.3% per day in the period between peak autumn yield and winter harvest, see Clifton-Brown, Breuer & Jones 2007, p. 2305.)

In Europe the peak (autumn) dry mass yield has been measured to roughly 10–40 tonnes per hectare per year (4–16 tonnes per acre per year), depending on location, with a mean peak dry mass yield of 22 tonnes. (Note: "The majority of the literature reporting dry biomass yield for M. x giganteus originates from European studies. Ceiling peak biomass yields in established stands of M. x giganteus have approached 40 t dry matter (DM) ha^{−1} in some European locations, although it may take 3–5 years to achieve these ceiling yields. Across Europe, harvestable yields of up to 25 t DM ha^{−1} from established stands of M. x giganteus have been reported in areas between central Germany and southern Italy, while peak yields in central and northern Europe have ranged between 10–25 t DM ha^{−1}, and in excess of 30 t DM ha^{−1} in southern Europe. A quantitative review of established M. x giganteus stands across Europe reported a mean peak biomass yield of 22 t DM ha^{−1}, averaged across N rates and precipitation levels." Anderson et al. 2014, p. 79.) Individual trials show peak yields of 17 tonnes (Denmark), 17–30 tonnes (Germany and Austria), 25 tonnes (The Netherlands), 39 tonnes (Portugal), and 42–49 tonnes (France). Individual trials also show delayed (winter/spring) yields of 10 tonnes (Denmark), 11–17 tonnes (UK), 14 tonnes (Spain), 10–20 tonnes (Germany), 16–17 tonnes (The Netherlands), 22 tonnes (Austria), 20–25 tonnes (Italy), 26–30 tonnes (Portugal) and 30 tonnes (France). A different trial showed delayed yields of 15 tonnes in Germany. (Note: "From the second year of Miscanthus planting, crops were annually harvested on the verge of shoot in late March or the beginning of April. Mean Miscanthus yield was 15 Mg dry mass (d.m.) ha^{−1} y^{−1}, which remained nearly constant from the fourth year of establishment." Felten & Emmerling 2012, p. 662.) Researchers have estimated a mean delayed yield of both 10 tonnes for the UK, (Note: "The yields used in the calculation of GHG emissions and crop economics this study used mean yields of 12–14 Mg ha^{−1} y^{−1} that have been observed from Mxg from current commercial plantings observed in the United Kingdom (private communication, M. Mos). We have assumed a logistic yield increase for establishment year yields and a linear decline in yield after 15 years Lesur et al. (2013). Inter-annual yield variation, due to weather conditions, as observed in long term trials (Clifton-Brown et al., 2007) and modeled Miscanthus yields for the United Kingdom, using weather data from 2000 to 2009 (Harris et al., 2014) using the MiscanFor model (Hastings et al., 2009, 2013) indicates that the weather related standard deviation of inter-annual yield variation in the United Kingdom is of the order 2.1 Mg ha^{−1} y^{−1} for a mean yield of 10.5 Mg ha^{−1} y^{−1} for the whole of the United Kingdom. The modeled yields are generally pessimistic as they calculate rain-fed yields and do not account for ground water support that is available in many United Kingdom arable farms." Hastings et al. 2017, p. 4.) and between 10.5 and 15 tonnes for the UK.

As can be seen, yields are highest in southern Europe; in general 25–30 tonnes under rainfed conditions (if harvest is delayed until winter/spring). With irrigation, individual trials in Portugal yielded 36 tonnes, Italy 34–38 tonnes, and Greece 38–44 tonnes. Trials in Illinois, USA, yielded 10–15 tonnes per acre (25–37 t/ha). Like in Europe, yields increase farther south.

For biomass in general, yields are expected to be higher in tropical climates than in temperate climates. (Note: Vaclav Smil estimates roughly a doubling of net primary production (NPP) of biomass in the tropics compared to the temperate regions of the world. Smil 2015, p. 81 .) For Miscanthus × giganteus specifically, researchers however disagree about the yield potential. Since there are no actual field trials done in the tropics yet, only estimates based on theory are possible. Some argue that the plant tolerates heat, (Note: Researchers with the EU project MAGIC (Marginal Lands for Growing Industrial Crops) states that the temperature growth range for Miscanthus × giganteus is between 8 and 45 °C. EU MAGIC spreadsheet 2021.) and that the yield potential is between 60 and 100 dry tonnes per hectare per year. (Note: «A factor of approximately two converts dry matter to carbon (Michel et al., 2006) and 10 from t ha^{−1} to kg m^{−2}. [...] Figure 2 shows global predictions of Miscanthus NPP from the viability simulation. The calculated values range from 0.5 kg C m^{−2} yr^{−1} in boreal region to between 1 and 2 kg C m^{−2} yr^{−1} in mid-latitudes and 3 and 5 kg C m^{−2}yr^{−1} in the tropics.» Hughes et al. 2010, pp. 82–83.) Others argue that heat tolerance is low, and subsequently predict low yields. (Note: Sheperd et al. argue that Micanthus × giganteus «downregulates assimilate production above 28°C» and predict that yields in the tropics will be low. No estimate of an average tropical yield is provided however. Shepherd et al. 2020, pp. 295, 298.) There is agreement that other miscanthus genotypes have a high tolerance for heat, e.g. Miscanthus Sinensis. Other elephant grass types clearly suited to high temperatures (different napier variants) have been shown to yield up to 80 tonnes per hectare, (Note: Zhang et al. measured a bana grass (napier variant) yield of 74 tonnes per hectare per year with light fertilisation and 1000 mm rainfall. Zhang et al. 2010, pp. 96, 98 (table 1).) (Note: Hoshino et al. measured a napier yield of 75.6 tonnes per hectare per year the second year of growth under heavy fertilisation and with rainfall level 1000 mm annually. Hoshino, Ono & Sirikiratayanond 1979, pp. 310, 311, 315.) (Note: Vicente-Chandler et al. found that heavily fertilized napiergrass produced 75,661 pounds of dry matter per acre per year when cut at 90-day intervals, equivalent to 84.8 tonnes per hectare per year. Vicente-Chandler, Silva & Figarella 1959, p. 202.) and commercial napier grass developers advertise yields of roughly 100 dry tonnes per hectare per year, provided there is an adequate amount of rain or irrigation available (100 mm per month). (Note: "The total water requirements are approximately 100 mm (4 inches) per month rainfall equivalent. [...] The yield of Giant King Grass depends on the time between harvests. For example, a six-month harvest of tall Giant King Grass, one can expect to obtain 80 or more US tons per acre (180 metric tons per hectare) of fresh grass at approximately 70–75% moisture. For two harvests per year, double these figures." Viaspace 2020.) (Note: Mackay quotes yields of 360 wet tonnes per hectare per year, but does not quantify moisture content. Mackay 2020.)

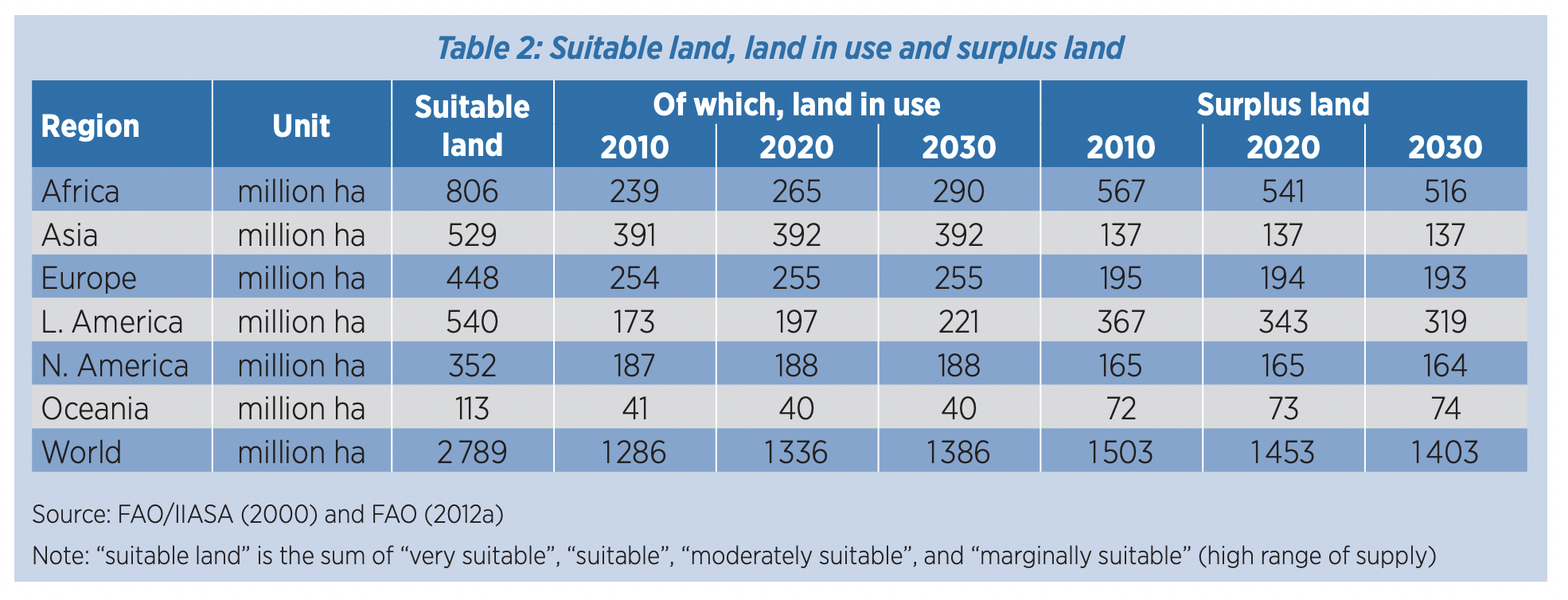
Total suitable land for agriculture, land already used for food production, and land available for bioenergy in 2010, 2020 and 2030.

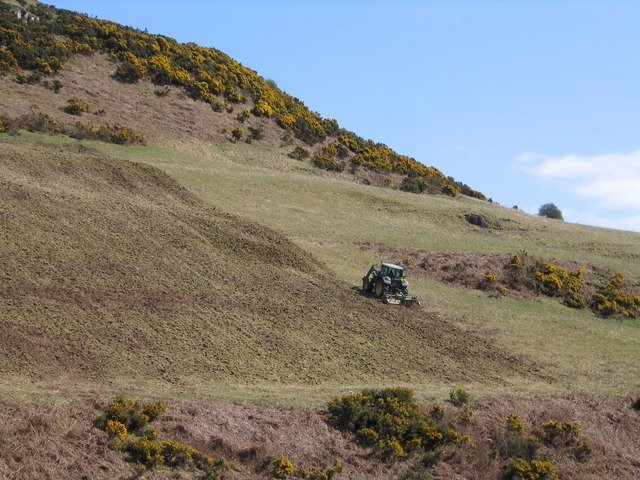
Steep, marginal land.

In general, yield expectations are lower for marginal land than for arable land in the same geographical area. Marginal land is land with issues that limits growth, for instance low water and nutrient storage capacity, high salinity, toxic elements, poor texture, shallow soil depth, poor drainage, low fertility, or steep terrain. Depending on how the term is defined, between 1.1 and 6.7 billion hectares of marginal land exists in the world. (Note: "The Asia-Pacific Economic Cooperation (APEC) estimates that marginal lands make up approximately 400 million hectares across Asia, the Pacific Islands, Australia, and North America. Other estimates put the global marginal land area anywhere from 1100 to 6650 million hectares, depending on the parameters used to describe marginal (e.g., "non-favored agricultural land", "abandoned or degraded cropland", or arid, forested, grassland, shrubland, or savanna habitats). The potential area available in the USA for cellulosic biomass crops and low-input, high-diversity native perennial mixtures ranges from 43 to 123 million hectares. The differences in these estimates reflect the inconsistencies in the usage of the term "marginal land", despite its common use in the bioenergy industry and literature. Marginal lands are often described as degraded lands that are unfit for food production and/or of some ambiguously poor quality and are often termed unproductive. Unproductive soils are characterized by unfavorable chemical and/or physical properties that limit plant growth and yield, including low water and nutrient storage capacity, high salinity, toxic elements, and poor texture. Further difficulties encountered in marginal landscapes include shallow soil depth due to erosion, poor drainage, low fertility, steep terrain, and unfavorable climate. Despite the poor quality of marginal land and the potential problems it could present for its production, biomass is unlikely to be grown on high-quality land that is economically viable for traditional crops." Quinn et al. 2015, pp. 1–2.) For comparison, Europe consists of roughly 1 billion hectares (10 million km2, or 3.9 million square miles), and Asia 4.5 billion hectares (45 million km^{2}, or 17 million square miles). According to IRENA (International Renewable Energy Agency), 1.5 billion hectares of land is currently used for food production globally, while "[...] about 1.4 billion ha [hectares] additional land is suitable but unused to date and thus could be allocated for bioenergy supply in the future." The IPCC estimates that there is between 0.32 and 1.4 billion hectares of marginal land suitable for bioenergy in the world. (Note: «Estimates of marginal/degraded lands currently considered available for bioenergy range from 3.2–14.0 Mkm2, depending on the adopted sustainability criteria, land class definitions, soil conditions, land mapping method and environmental and economic considerations (Campbell et al. 2008; Cai et al. 2011; Lewis and Kelly 2014).» IPCC 2019c.) The EU project MAGIC estimates that there is 45 million hectares (449 901 km2; comparable to Sweden in size) of marginal land suitable for Miscanthus × giganteus plantations in the European Union, with three classes of expected yield (high: 30–40 t/ha/yr, medium: 20–30 t/ha/yr, and low: 0–20 t/ha/yr).

Miscanthus × giganteus is either moderately or highly tolerant of heat, drought, flooding, salinity (below 100 mM), and cool soil temperatures (down to −3.4 °C, or 25 °F). (Note: It takes 30 days with a mean temperature of below −3.4 °C before the soil temperature fall to below −3.4 °C. See Hastings et al. 2009b, p. 184. Quinn et al. state that "[m]iscanthus × giganteus leaf area and yield reduced under drought stress, but water availability does not affect shoot production or plant height at the beginning of the growing season. [p. 4]. [...] Miscanthus × giganteus biomass and rhizome viability unaffected by flooding [p. 5]. [...] Salinity above 100 mM affected Miscanthus × giganteus growth, with rhizomes > roots > shoots in order of increasing sensitivity (rhizomes least sensitive). Plants grown from larger rhizomes initially were less sensitive. [p. 8]. [...] The lethal temperature at which 50 % (LT50) of Miscanthus × giganteus rhizomes were killed was −3.4 °C, which can be problematic especially during first winter. [...] Miscanthus × giganteus shows unusual cold tolerance for a C4 species. [p. 10] [...] Because C4 and CAM species have inherent mechanisms to resist heat stress, it makes sense to consider biomass crops with these photosynthetic pathways (see Table 5) [page 11]. [...] Our literature review has revealed several "all purpose" biomass crops that are moderately or highly tolerant of multiple environmental stressors (Table 6). For example, Andropogon gerardii, Eucalyptus spp., Miscanthus spp., Panicum virgatum, Pinus spp., Populus spp., Robinia pseudoacacia, and Spartina pectinata were shown to be moderately or highly tolerant of four or more stress types [p. 14]." Quinn et al. 2015, pp. 4, 5, 8, 10, 11, 14.) This robustness makes it possible to establish relatively high-yielding miscanthus fields on marginal land, for instance in coastal areas, damp habitats, grasslands, abandoned milling sites, forest edges, streamsides, foothills and mountain slopes. 99% of Europe's saline, marginal lands can be used for M. × giganteus plantations, with only an expected maximum yield loss of 11%. (Note: "Most saline soils covering 539 567 km2 in the European geographical area can be used to grow Miscanthus with up to an estimated 11% reduction in yield; a further 2717 km2 can be used with an estimated 28% reduction in yield, and only, 3607 km2 will produce a yield reduction greater that 50%." Stavridou et al. 2017, p. 99.) Since salinity up to 200 mM does not affect roots and rhizomes, carbon sequestration carries on unaffected. (Note: "Rhizome D.W. [dry weight] and the ratios of root/rhizome and below‐/above‐ground D.W. were not affected by increased salinity, and only, the root D.W. was significantly reduced at the highest salt concentration (22.4 dS m−1 NaCl) (Table 1). Płażek et al. (2014) showed a similar response in M. × giganteus, with reduction only in roots D.W. at 200 mm NaCl and no changes in rhizomes D.W. below 200 mm NaCl. This ability of perennial grasses to maintain below‐ground biomass under stress conditions could preserve sufficient reserves for the following growing season (Karp & Shield, 2008); while this may be physiologically relevant for transitory stresses like drought, it remains to be seen how this response affects year on year yield under the accumulative stress effect of salinity." Stavridou et al. 2017, p. 100.) Researchers found a yield loss of 36% on a marginal site limited by low temperatures (Moscow), compared to maximum yield on arable land in central Europe. They also found a yield loss of 21% on a marginal site limited by drought (Turkey), compared to maximum yields on arable soil in central Europe. (Note: "The highest biomass yields as well as the highest GHG- and fossil-energy savings potentials (up to 30.6 t CO2eq/ha*a [CO2 equivalents per hectare per year] and 429 GJ/ha*a [gigajoule per hectare per year], respectively) can be achieved on non-marginal sites in Central Europe. On marginal sites limited by cold (Moscow/Russia) or drought (Adana/Turkey) savings of up to 19.2 t CO2eq/ha*a and 273 GJ/ha*a (Moscow) and 24.0 t CO2eq/ha*a and 338 GJ/ha*a (Adana) can be achieved." Lewandowski et al. 2016, p. 19.)

Researchers predict an average yield of 14.6 dry tonnes per hectare per year for miscanthus on marginal land in China, 12.6% below expected average yield on arable land. They calculate that miscanthus on marginal land in China can produce 31.7 EJ (exajoule) of energy annually, an amount equivalent to 39% of the country's 2019 coal consumption. (Note: China's coal based energy consumption was 81.67 EJ in 2019 (52% of the worldwide consumption). See page 47. BP 2020.) An individual trial in Ireland showed an average delayed yield of 9 tonnes per hectare per year on a site troubled by low temperatures, waterlogging during winter, and dried out, cracked soil during summer. Researchers reported yields ranging from 17 to 31 tonnes on a variety of soils in the USA (Kentucky, Illinois, Nebraska, New Jersey, Virginia and North Carolina), and compared those to a specific trial with lightly fertilised 3 year old miscanthus crops on eroded claypan soils, common in the Midwest (a claypan is a layer of clay beneath the topsoil, which make the soil marginal for grain crops.) The miscanthus crops yielded 20–24 tonnes per hectare per year (delayed harvest). The authors concluded that "[...] eroded claypan soils may not negatively impact Miscanthus establishment or yield."

Yield prediction software Miscanfor predicts that 30 days of soil dryness is the mean maximum amount of time a miscanthus crop can endure before wilting, while 60 days is the maximum before its rhizomes are killed and the crop has to be replanted. (Note: "Shoot death means that in a given year, there will be limited yield but a recovery the following year. Rhizome kill means that the crop needs to be replanted. [...] For drought conditions, we calculate the time below the wilting point: if this exceeds 30 days, then the shoot is killed for that year, if it exceeds 60 days for M. × giganteus the rhizome is killed and the crop destroyed. This was based upon a growing chamber water stress experiment with M. × giganteus (Clifton‐Brown and Hastings, unpublished data). This is extended to 60 and 120 days for M. sinensis." Hastings et al. 2009b, p. 161.) In addition to adequate rainfall, soil water holding capacity is important for high yields, especially in dry periods. (Note: Roncucci et al. reports approximately 2x better yield for miscanthus planted in silty clay loam (which has better water holding capacity) compared to sandy loam soil (Italy) after a relatively normal growing season precipitation wise, and approximately 6x better yield after a growing season containing severe drought: "In the second year of growth (2011) crops growing in SiC [silty-clay-loam] soil showed a significantly higher aboveground dry yield (Table S1) compared to crops growing in SL [sandy loam] soil (19.1 vs. 10.9 Mg ha^{−1}) (Fig. 2a). [...] General trends in biomass productivity were amplified in the third growing year (2012), when miscanthus growing in SL soil was severely influenced by the summer drought which led to premature aboveground senescence, leaf loss and inhibition of flowering. Hence, averaged over the three harvest dates, dry biomass yield in the SL soil was one order of magnitude lower than in the SiC soil (24.6 vs. 3.9 Mg ha^{−1}). [...] The results obtained in our experiments confirmed the importance of water availability in determining satisfactory miscanthus yields in a Mediterranean environment. In fact, miscanthus plantations in soils characterized by a poor water holding capacity (i.e. SL soil) were severely affected after three growing years, with harvestable dry yields lower than 5 Mg ha−1. [...] Roncucci et al. 2015, pp. 1001, 1004. Stričević et al. make a similar point, adding root depth to the equation: "Water availability for Miscanthus depended equally on precipitation and accumulated soil moisture, such that yields were generally a reflection of root depth and soil characteristics. For example, the yields recorded at Ralja were lower than those achieved at Zemun because of the restrictive soil layer in the former case [at 1.1 m] and the inability of Miscanthus to develop deeper roots. The importance of soil and root depth for the simulation of plant production has been corroborated by other researchers (Raes et al., 2009)." See Stričević et al. 2015, pp. 1205.) In soils with poor water holding capacity, irrigation in the establishment season is important because it allows the roots to reach far deeper underground, thereby increasing the plants' ability to collect water. (Note: Stričević et al. make a contrasting point however: "Each year Miscanthus increased its above‐ground biomass and root depth [...]. In the first 2 years Miscanthus formed rhizomes and root growth was slow. In the third year, there was enough moisture in the more fertile surface layer of soil, such that root depth was smaller than expected. The next 3 years were dry, so in search for water the roots considerably increased their depth (up to 2.3 m), which was consistent with data collected from other experiments (Neukirchen et al., 1999; Riche & Christian, 2001)." See Stričević et al. 2015, pp. 1207.) (Note: Irrigation can also increase yield if applied during dry growing seasons (defined as 150–300 mm rainfall). In soils with good water holding capacity, irrigation can potentially be avoided if rainfall exceeds 420 mm: "Mantineo et al. (2009) stated how irrigation in the first 3 years after the establishment affected miscanthus belowground growth and size, and the same authors found good aboveground yields during the fourth and fifth years (around 27 and 18 Mg ha^{−1}) when no irrigation was given. These findings are corroborated by Mann et al. (2013b) who investigated the root system dynamics of miscanthus in response to rainfed and irrigated conditions, and highlighted no roots development below a depth of 1.2 m under rainfed conditions, while given supplemental irrigation during the establishment, miscanthus was able to develop roots 3 m down. Therefore, miscanthus growth patterns in sandy‐loam soil (Experiment 1) highlighted the importance of supplying irrigation water also during the years following the establishment. However, in soils characterized by a good water holding capacity (Experiment 2), revealed that irrigation water had no influence on crop productivity. Previous studies conducted in the Mediterranean (central and southern Italy) comparing irrigated and rainfed miscanthus crops gave ambiguous results. In fact, in southern Italy, two‐ and three‐year old crops responded to irrigation only when water supply exceeded 440 mm (Cosentino et al., 2007) or when precipitation during the growing season was rather limited (around 400 mm) (Mantineo et al., 2009). The importance of precipitation for miscanthus grown in Mediterranean was confirmed by Petrini et al. (1996) who compared rainfed and irrigated miscanthus in two different locations in central Italy. In 2‐year old crops no differences in the aboveground yield were recorded at the site with a higher precipitation (>420 mm), while a 58% increase in aboveground dry yield was observed in irrigated miscanthus at the site with a lower precipitation (around 313 mm). Finally, in our experimental site, Ercoli et al. (1999), when comparing the effect of irrigation and nitrogen fertilization on miscanthus yield, observed an increase in about 20% (+4.5 Mg ha^{−1}) in irrigated vs. rainfed plots harvested in autumn. This is consistent with our results: when precipitation during the growing season was rather low (~164 mm) and similar to that reported by Ercoli et al. (1999) (~173 mm), plots receiving irrigation increased their dry yield by around 15% compared to rainfed plots. Conversely, in 2012 when precipitation was much greater (~400 mm) miscanthus under ET0 and ET75 yielded nearly the same." Roncucci et al. 2015, pp. 1005–1006, .) (Note: Stričević et al. make a similar point for crops in Serbia. The soil in this area is generally well wetted at the start of the growing season because of snow melt. If the roots grow deep (2–3 m) and the soil has good water holding capacity, 300–400 mm rainfall during the season is enough for good yields (20–25 tonnes per hectare per year). Stričević et al. 2015, pp. 1204–1205. (However, in table 2, page 1208, the stated rainfall levels for the 20–25 tonne yields is even lower; 220, 220 and 217 mm. It is unclear why the authors went for the 300–400 mm estimation instead of 220 mm.) The authors note that if there are no water constraints at all, that is, if the crops are irrigated, you can expect twice the yield (42 tonnes per hectare per year). Note that this yield is a result of a computer simulation, it is not an actual measured yield. The authors used FAO's freely available yield prediction software AquaCrop to calculate yield under optimal conditions: "Although Miscanthus generally achieves high yields even when its water supply is low, it responds very well to irrigation, increasing biomass yield by as much as 100% (Cosentino et al., 2007). In Serbia's ecological circumstances, Miscanthus had enough water during the first 3 years of research, but it was under water stress over short periods in the fourth, fifth, and sixth years. To check whether the model generated realistic biomass levels when the water supply was nonlimiting, the file called 'Generation of irrigation schedule' was used and the option 'Replenish when 80% readily available water depleted' was selected. As such, if irrigation is applied, the dates of irrigation and amounts of water need to be entered so that they are accounted for in the water balance. In the present example, instead of entering the dates of irrigation and amounts of water, the model determined how much water was needed and when, to achieve potential yields. The same input data with the addition of irrigation water generated a yield of 42 Mg ha−1, which matched those recorded in Greece and Italy under irrigation and constraint free‐conditions, in similar climatic circumstances and with similar crop densities (Cosentino et al., 2007; Danalatos et al., 2007)." (ibid, pp 1206–1207).)

Miscanthus grows relatively well in soils contaminated by metals, or by industrial activities in general. For instance, in one trial, it was found that M. × giganteus absorbed 52% of the lead content and 19% of the arsenic content in the soil after three months. The absorption stabilizes the pollutants so they don't travel into the air (as dust), into ground water, neighbouring surface waters, or neighbouring areas used for food production. (Note: "Miscanthus grown on contaminated soils can contain higher shoot TE [trace elements; metals and metalloids] concentrations, but the TF [translocation factor], which is for the most part less than 1, indicates that root-to-shoot TE transfer is minimized (Table 3). The combination of this trait with low BCF [bio concentration factor] and higher TE concentrations in roots than in shoots demonstrates the capacity to contain TE in soils. Owing to the perennial growth and its ability to stabilize TE and degrade some organic pollutants, Miscanthus could potentially limit pollutant transfer into different environmental compartments by reducing (1) pollutant leaching from the root zone and groundwater contamination, (2) pollutant run-off (water erosion) and surface water contamination, (3) dust emission into the atmosphere due to wind erosion and seasonal soil tillage, and (4) pollutant transfer into plant AG [above ground] parts and thus transfer into food chains. Therefore, as non-food crops, Miscanthus forms a potential resource for phytomanagement of contaminated areas, with the option of TE phytostabilization and/or organic pollutant degradation, hence the opportunity to reduce both human and environmental risks." Nsanganwimana et al. 2014, p. 129.) If contaminated miscanthus is used as fuel, the combustion site need to install the appropriate equipment to handle this situation. On the whole though, "[…] Miscanthus is [a] suitable crop for combining biomass production and ecological restoration of contaminated and marginal land." Researchers argue that because of miscanthus' ability to be "[…] productive on lower grade agricultural land, including heavy metal contaminated and saline soils […]" it can "[…] contribute to the sustainable intensification of agriculture, allowing farmers to diversify and provide biomass for an expanding market without compromising food security."

==== Yield – comparison with other energy sources ====
To calculate land use requirements for different kinds of energy production, it is essential to know the relevant surface power production densities (e.g. power production per square metre).

Nuclear power has very high power densities. Bruce Nuclear Generating Station, one of the largest nuclear power plants in the world, occupies a total of 932 hectares (2,300 acres) of land and has an overall thermal output of 22,656 MW. Total net electric output is 6,508 MW. The areal power density is thus 2,431 W/m^{2} (225.8 W/sq ft) for thermal output and 698.3 W/m^{2} (64.87 W/sq ft) for net electric output. Oil fields can also be very energy dense. The Ghawar Oil Field produces oil equivalent to 7.955 exajoules (2.210×10^{12} kWh) per year on an area of roughly 8,400 square kilometres (3,200 sq mi). Averaging those figures out over a year gives 252.25 Gigawatts or some 30.03 W/m^{2} (2.790 W/sq ft).

The average surface power production densities for modern biofuels, wind, hydro and solar power production are 0.3 W/m^{2} (0.028 W/sq ft), 1 W/m^{2} (0.093 W/sq ft), 3 W/m^{2} (0.28 W/sq ft) and 5 W/m^{2} (0.46 W/sq ft), respectively (power in the form of heat for biofuels, and electricity for wind, hydro and solar). The surface power production density for miscanthus plantations sourced for heat production is 0.6 W/m^{2} per 10 tonnes of yield per hectare. In other words, a 30 tonne yield equals 1.8 W/m^{2}, which effectively puts the power density of a plantation with this yield in between the average power densities of wind and hydro (see below). The average human power consumption on ice-free land is 0.125 W/m^{2} (0.0116 W/sq ft) (heat and electricity combined), although rising to 20 W/m^{2} (1.9 W/sq ft) in urban and industrial areas.

The reason for the low power density for other kinds of biofuels is a combination of low yields and only partial utilization of the plant (for instance, ethanol is typically made from sugarcane's sugar content or corn's starch content, while biodiesel is often made from the oil content in rapeseed or soybean). Furthermore conversion losses occur in alcoholic fermentation (an exothermic process) of sugars into ethanol.

When used for ethanol production, miscanthus plantations with a yield of 15 tonnes per hectare per year generate only 0.40 W/m^{2}. Corn fields generate 0.26 W/m^{2} (yield 10 t/ha). In Brazil sugarcane fields typically generate 0.41 W/m^{2}. Winter wheat (USA) generates 0.08 W/m^{2} and German wheat generates 0.30 W/m^{2}. When grown for jet fuel, soybean generates 0.06 W/m^{2}, while palm oil generates 0.65 W/m^{2}. Jathropa grown on marginal land generate 0.20 W/m^{2}. When grown for biodiesel, rapeseed generate 0.12 W/m^{2} (EU average). In contrast to miscanthus cultivation and solid fuel production, typical liquid biofuel raw material cultivation and fuel production require large energy inputs. When these inputs are compensated for (when used energy is subtracted from produced energy), power density drops further down: Rapeseed based biodiesel production in the Netherlands have the highest energy efficiency in the EU with an adjusted power density of 0.08 W/m^{2}, while sugar beets based bioethanol produced in Spain have the lowest, at only 0.02 W/m^{2}.

Using solid biomass for energy purposes is more efficient than using liquids, as the whole plant can be utilized. For instance, corn plantations producing solid biomass for combustion generate more than double the amount of power per square metre compared to corn plantations producing for ethanol, when the yield is the same: 10 t/ha generates 0.60 W/m^{2} and 0.26 W/m^{2} respectively, without compensating for energy input. It has been estimated that large-scale plantations with pines, acacias, poplars and willows in temperate regions achieve yields of 5–15 dry tonnes per hectare per year, which means a surface power production density of 0.30–0.90 W/m^{2}. For similarly large plantations, with eucalyptus, acacia, leucaena, pinus and dalbergia in tropical and subtropical regions, yields are typically 20–25 t/ha, which means a surface power production density of 1.20–1.50 W/m^{2}. Note that this yield estimate is somewhat higher than the FAO estimate above, and it effectively put also these plantations' power densities in-between the densities of wind and hydro. In Brazil, the average yield for eucalyptus is 21 t/ha, but in Africa, India and Southeast Asia, typical eucalyptus yields are below 10 t/ha.

Oven dry biomass in general, including wood, miscanthus and napier grass, have a calorific content of roughly 18 megajoules per kilogram (2.3 kWh/lb). When calculating power production per square metre, every t/ha of dry biomass yield increases a plantation's power production by 0.06 W/m^{2}. As mentioned above, the world average for wind, hydro and solar power production is 1 W/m^{2}, 3 W/m^{2} and 5 W/m^{2} respectively. In order to match these power densities, plantation yields must reach 17 t/ha, 50 t/ha and 83 t/ha for wind, hydro and solar respectively. To match the world average for biofuels (0.3 W/m^{2}), plantations need to produce 5 tonnes of dry mass per hectare per year.

Note however that yields need to be adjusted to compensate for the amount of moisture in the biomass (evaporating moisture in order to reach the ignition point is usually wasted energy). The moisture of biomass straw or bales varies with the surrounding air humidity and eventual pre-drying measures, while pellets have a standardized (ISO-defined) moisture content of below 10% (wood pellets) (Note: "The raw material for wood pellets is woody biomass in accordance with Table 1 of ISO 17225‑1. Pellets are usually manufactured in a die, with total moisture content usually less than 10 % of their mass on wet basis." ISO (International Organization for Standardization) 2014a.) and below 15% (other pellets). (Note: "The raw material for non-woody pellets can be herbaceous biomass, fruit biomass, aquatic biomass or biomass blends and mixtures. These blends and mixtures can also include woody biomass. They are usually manufactured in a die with total moisture content usually less than 15 % of their mass." ISO (International Organization for Standardization) 2014b.) Likewise, for wind, hydro and solar, power line transmission losses amounts to roughly 8% globally and should be accounted for. (Note: Transmission loss data from the World Bank, sourced from IEA. The World Bank 2010.) If biomass is to be utilized for electricity production rather than heat production, yields have to be roughly tripled in order to compete with wind, hydro and solar, as the current heat to electricity conversion efficiency (thermal efficiency) is only 30–40% in thermal power plants. When simply comparing the surface power production densities of biofuel, wind, hydro and solar, without regard for cost, this effectively pushes both hydro and solar power out of reach of even the highest yielding elephant grass plantations, power density wise. (Note: Additionally, Smil estimates that newly installed photovoltaic solar parks reaches 7–11 W/m^{2} in sunny regions of the world. Smil 2015, p. 191.)

Note that cogeneration and combined cycle power plants can achieve higher efficiencies by making better use of waste heat. The Copenhill waste incineration plant produces heat to the district heating network in addition to electricity. According to IEA Bioenergy it has a combined net thermal efficiency of 107% (NCV).

=== Carbon sequestration ===
==== Soil carbon input/output ====
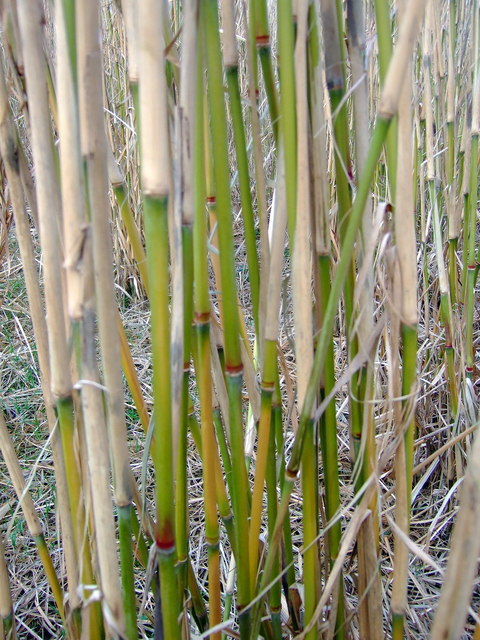
At the end of each season, the plant pulls the nutrients to the ground. The color shifts from green to yellow/brown.

Plants sequester carbon through photosynthesis, a sunlight-driven process where CO_{2} and water are absorbed and then combined to form carbohydrates. The absorbed carbon is released back to the atmosphere as CO_{2} when the harvested biomass is combusted, but the belowground parts of the plant (roots and rhizomes) remain in the soil and can potentially add substantial amounts of carbon to the soil over the years.

The amount of carbon in the soil is determined by the input rate of new carbon and the decay rate of old carbon. (Note: "Soil carbon stocks are a balance between the soil organic matter decomposition rate and the organic material input each year by vegetation, animal manure, or any other organic input." McCalmont et al. 2017, p. 496.) Soil carbon that is derived from plants is a continuum, ranging from living biomass to humus, and it decays in different stages. It can be divided into an active, a slow and a passive pool, with mean carbon residence times (MRT) of 0.1–2 years, 15–100 years, and 500–5000 years for the three pools, respectively. The topsoil carbon residence time was 60 years on average in one experiment (specifically 19 years for depths between 0 and 10 centimetres (0.0 and 3.9 in), and 30–152 years for depths between 10 and 50 centimetres (3.9 and 19.7 in).) Carbon below 50 centimetres (20 in) was stable. The actual rate of carbon decay in a particular location depends on many factors, for instance plant species, soil type, temperature and humidity. Researchers did not find evidence of decreasing soil organic carbon accumulation as their test miscanthus crop aged, which meant no carbon saturation at that site for 20 years. Others estimate 30–50 years of continuous soil carbon increase after a land use change from annual to perennial crops. The amount of carbon in the ground under miscanthus fields is expected to increase during the entire life of the crop, but possibly with a slow start because of the initial tilling (plowing, digging) and the relatively low amounts of carbon input in the establishment phase. (Note: "SOC [soil organic carbon] derived from crop inputs will be lower during the early years of establishment (Zimmermann et al., 2012) with disturbance losses of resident C3 carbon outpacing C4 inputs when planted into grassland." McCalmont et al. 2017, p. 496.) (Note: Likewise, N2O (nitrous oxide) emissions vary strongly with prior land use, crop maturity, and fertilzation rate, however "[...] postestablishment emissions from perennial crops were generally much lower than emissions from annual crops [...] we conclude that targeting low carbon soils for perennial bioenergy crop cultivation will reduce soil carbon losses in the short‐term and promote soil carbon sequestration in the long‐term. Globally, it is proposed that managing land to promote such sequestration, and avoid loss, may be a valuable tool in the mitigation of climate change (Lal, 2003)." Whitaker et al. 2018, pp. 152, 154.) (Tilling helps the soil microbe populations to decompose the available carbon, producing CO_{2}.) (Note: "Any soil disturbance, such as ploughing and cultivation, is likely to result in short-term respiration losses of soil organic carbon, decomposed by stimulated soil microbe populations (Cheng, 2009; Kuzyakov, 2010). Annual disturbance under arable cropping repeats this year after year resulting in reduced SOC levels. Perennial agricultural systems, such as grassland, have time to replace their infrequent disturbance losses which can result in higher steady-state soil carbon contents (Gelfand et al., 2011; Zenone et al., 2013)." McCalmont et al. 2017, p. 493.) (Note: "Tillage breaks apart soil aggregates which, among other functions, are thought to inhibit soil bacteria, fungi and other microbes from consuming and decomposing SOM (Grandy and Neff 2008). Aggregates reduce microbial access to organic matter by restricting physical access to mineral-stabilised organic compounds as well as reducing oxygen availability (Cotrufo et al. 2015; Lehmann and Kleber 2015). When soil aggregates are broken open with tillage in the conversion of native ecosystems to agriculture, microbial consumption of SOC and subsequent respiration of CO2 increase dramatically, reducing soil carbon stocks (Grandy and Robertson 2006; Grandy and Neff 2008)." IPCC 2019a, p. 393.) Researchers argue that the high carbon storage below miscanthus fields is because of high proportions of pre- and direct-harvest residues (e.g. dead leaves), direct humus accumulation, a well-developed and deep-reaching root system, low decomposition rates of plant residues due to high carbon to nitrogen ratios, and absence of tillage (which leads to less soil aeration.)

==== Net annual carbon accumulation ====
According to the IPCC, an increase in soil carbon is important for both climate mitigation and climate adaptation. (Note: "Five options have large mitigation potential (>3 GtCO2e yr–1) without adverse impacts on the other challenges (high confidence). These are: increased food productivity; reduced deforestation and forest degradation; increased soil organic carbon content; fire management; and reduced post-harvest losses. [...] Increasing soil carbon stocks removes CO2 from the atmosphere and increases the water-holding capacity of the soil, thereby conferring resilience to climate change and enhancing adaptation capacity. [...] Since increasing soil organic matter content is a measure to address land degradation (see Section 6.2.1), and restoring degraded land helps to improve resilience to climate change, soil carbon increase is an important option for climate change adaptation. With around 120,000 km2 lost to degradation every year, and over 3.2 billion people negatively impacted by land degradation globally (IPBES 2018), practices designed to increase soil organic carbon have a large potential to address adaptation challenges (Table 6.23)." IPCC 2019d, pp. 591, 572, 591.) A number of studies try to quantify the miscanthus-caused increase in soil carbon in various locations and under various circumstances:

Dondini et al. found 32 tonnes more carbon per hectare under a 14 year old miscanthus field than in the control site, suggesting a mean carbon accumulation rate of 2.29 tonnes per hectare per year, or 38% of total harvested carbon per year. (Note: Dondini et al. 2009, p. 422. The authors do not quantify the above-ground dry mass yield, instead the median of McCalmont's 10–15 tonnes estimation for the whole of the UK is used here (see McCalmont et al. 2017, p. 497), together with Kahle et al.'s miscanthus carbon content estimation of 48% (see Kahle et al. 2001, table 3, page 176.) Likewise, Milner et al. suggest a mean carbon accumulation rate for the whole of the UK of 2.28 tonnes (also 38% of total harvested carbon per year), given that some unprofitable land (0.4% of total) is excluded. (Note: Milner et al. 2016, table 4, page 322, 323. Given the mean UK dry mass yield of 12.5 tonnes per hectare (see McCalmont et al. 2017, p. 497), together with Kahle et al.'s miscanthus carbon content estimation of 48% (see Kahle et al. 2001, table 3, page 176.) Nakajima et al. found a mean accumulation rate of 1.96 tonnes below a university test site in Sapporo, Japan, equivalent to 16% of total harvested carbon per year. The test was shorter though, only 6 years. (Note: Nakajima et al. 2018, p. 1. In general, lower net accumulation rates for young plantations are to be expected, because of accelerated carbon decay and therefore CO2 emissions at the time of planting (see Soil carbon input/output. The authors quote a dry mass yield of 25.6 (± 0.2) tonnes per hectare per year. Carbon content estimation 48% (see Kahle et al. 2001, table 3, page 176).) Hansen et al. found an accumulation rate of 0.97 tonne per year over 16 years under a test site in Hornum, Denmark, equivalent to 28% of total harvested carbon per year. (Note: The 16 year Miscanthus site had 106 tonnes of below-ground carbon per hectare. Control site 1 had 91 tonnes of below-ground carbon, control site 2 had 92 tonnes. Mean difference to the control sites 15.5 tonnes. For above-ground carbon, the total harvested dry matter per hectare for the 16 year site was 114 tonnes, or 7.13 tonnes per year. After 16 years, the total belowground carbon derived from Miscanthus (C4) had reached 18 tonnes, equivalent to 29% of the total inputted Miscanthus carbon over the years, in the form of fallen leaves, rhizomes and roots. The mean miscanthus-derived carbon input per year was 1.13 tonnes. Hansen et al. 2004, pp. 102–103.) McCalmont et al. compared a number of individual European reports, and found accumulation rates ranging from 0.42 to 3.8 tonnes, (Note: "[...] it seems likely that arable land converted to Miscanthus will sequester soil carbon; of the 14 comparisons, 11 showed overall increases in SOC over their total sample depths with suggested accumulation rates ranging from 0.42 to 3.8 Mg C ha^{−1} yr^{−1}. Only three arable comparisons showed lower SOC stocks under Miscanthus, and these suggested insignificant losses between 0.1 and 0.26 Mg ha^{−1} yr^{−1}." McCalmont et al. 2017, p. 493.) with a mean accumulation rate of 1.84 tonne, (Note: "The correlation between plantation age and SOC can be seen in Fig. 6, [...] the trendline suggests a net accumulation rate of 1.84 Mg C ha^{−1} yr^{−1} with similar levels to grassland at equilibrium." McCalmont et al. 2017, p. 496.) or 25% of total harvested carbon per year. (Note: Given the EU average peak yield of 22 tonnes dry matter per hectare per year (approximately 15 tonnes during spring harvest). See Anderson et al. 2014, p. 79). 15 tonnes also explicitly quoted as the mean spring yield in Germany, see Felten & Emmerling 2012, p. 662. 48% carbon content; see Kahle et al. 2001, table 3, page 176.) Variation in annual soil carbon change is high during the first 2–5 years after planting, but after 15 years the variation is negligible. (Note: «The variation of total SOM rates of change in the first 5 years after planting Miscanthus was very high, ranging from −4 to 7 mg C ha−1 yr−1 (Fig. 4b). A similar finding was reached elsewhere for the first 2–3 years after Miscanthus planting: −6.9 to 7.7 mg C ha−1 yr−1 (Zimmerman et al., 2011). The variation of annual SOM change decreased with time and was negligible after 15 years (Fig. 4b).» Zang et al. 2017, p. 267.)

=== Transport and combustion challenges ===
==== Overview ====
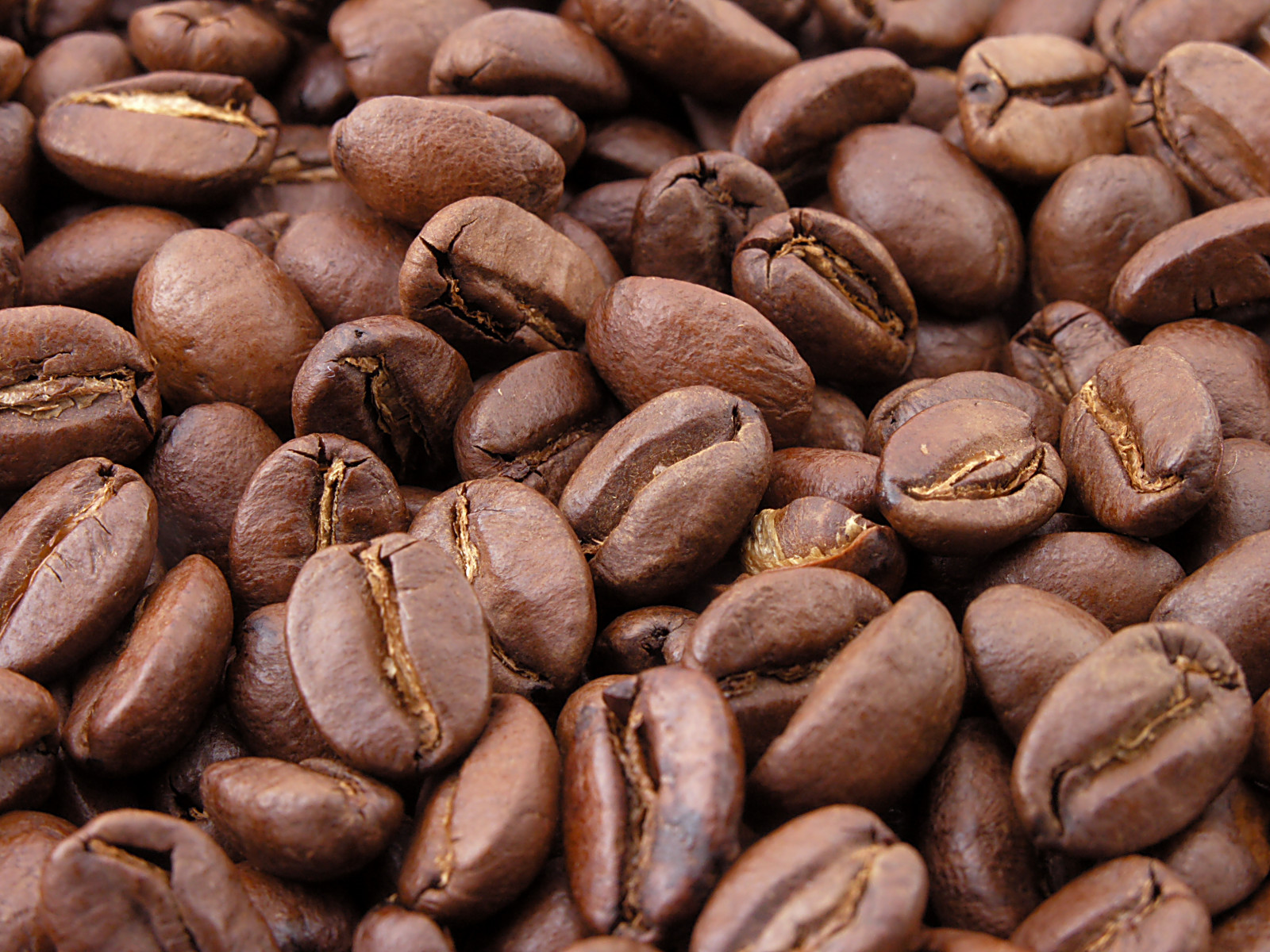
The development of the torrefaction process began as research into coffee roasting, in the late 19th century.

Biomass in general, including miscanthus, have different properties compared to coal, for instance when it comes to handling and transport, grinding, and combustion. This makes sharing the same logistics, grinding and combustion infrastructure difficult. Often new biomass handling facilities have to be built instead, which increases cost. (Note: "[...] [M]iscanthus had different chemical properties to that of ordinary wood pellets and requires specific boiler technologies to handle its alternative burning nature [...]. There are various boiler manufacturers and suppliers who claim they would be happy to utilise miscanthus in their boilers and will stand over the warranty with its use. However not every boiler supplier is happy to use miscanthus. Invariably if the boiler can utilise miscanthus it can also deal with less troublesome fuels such as wood but not the other way around." Caslin, Finnan & Easson 2010, pp. 31, 32.) Together with the relatively high cost of feedstock, this often leads to a situation where biomass projects have to receive subsidies to be economically viable. (Note: "Biomass production costs for miscanthus are presently too high to compete commercially with fossil fuels on an energy basis. The high biomass production costs for miscanthus result from insufficient development of agricultural production technology, accompanied by additional costs for agricultural inputs, land and labor for a relatively low-value biomass. Although they are amortized over a production period of 10–25 years, initial establishment costs for miscanthus are still comparatively high. This is because the only commercially available genotype Miscanthus × giganteus is a triploid hybrid that does not produce viable seeds. Consequently, costly establishment via rhizome or in vitro propagation has to be performed (Xue et al., 2015). Miscanthus is also new to farmers and they have neither the knowledge nor the technical equipment to cultivate it. Thus, inefficient production technology is currently limiting its widespread uptake as a biomass crop. There are no stable markets for miscanthus biomass and relevant applications are low-value. Farmers are hesitant to cultivate miscanthus because it involves dedicating their fields to long-term biomass production. They will only be willing to do this once biomass markets are stable or if long-term contracts are available (Wilson et al., 2014). The main use of lignocellulosic biomass from perennial crops is as a solid fuel for heat and power generation—a comparatively low-value use, its profitability being ultimately determined by the price of fossil fuels. In Europe, subsidies are generally necessary for bioenergy products to be able to compete in retail energy markets—with the notable exception of forest wood and forestry by-products that cannot be used for wood material products. Therefore, also higher-value applications for miscanthus biomass are required in order to provide attractive market options. There are no miscanthus varieties adapted to different site characteristics and biomass use options. In Europe, Miscanthus × giganteus is the only genotype commercially available. Major barriers to the breeding of miscanthus varieties are the high costs involved and the long breeding periods, necessary because most yield- and quality-relevant parameters are not quantifiable until after the establishment phase of 2–3 years." Lewandowski et al. 2016, p. 2.) A number of fuel upgrading technologies are currently being explored, however, that make biomass more compatible with the existing infrastructure. The most mature of these is torrefaction, basically an advanced roasting technique which—when combined with pelleting or briquetting—significantly influences handling and transport properties, grindability and combustion efficiency.

==== Energy density and transport costs ====
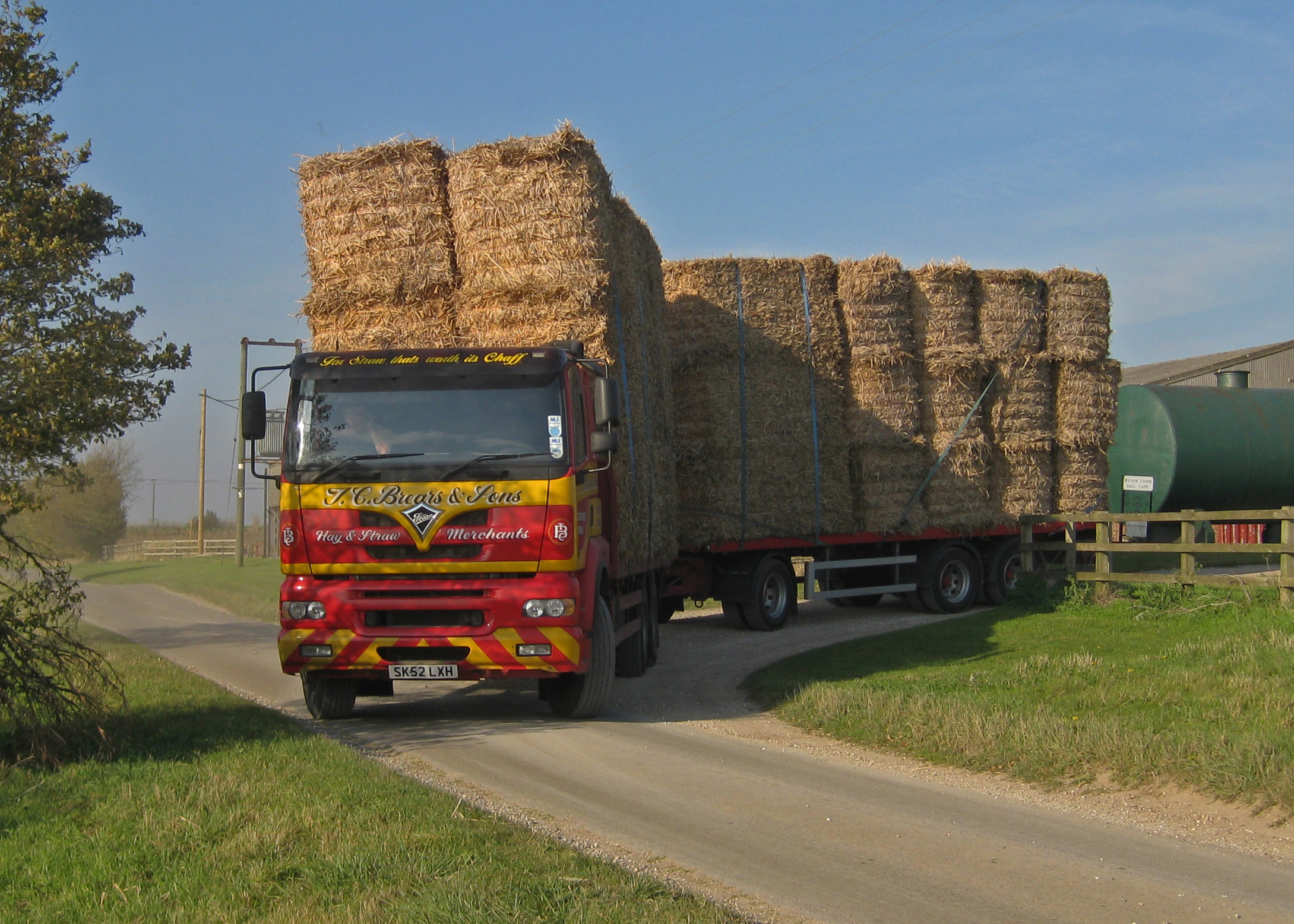
Transport of bulky, water absorbing miscanthus bales in England.

Miscanthus chips have a bulk density of 50–130 kg/m^{3} (84–219 lb/cu yd), (Note: "Miscanthus can be harvested by cutting with a conditioner mower and baling in large Heston bales or round bales and then chipped out of the bales. It can also be chipped by a maize Kemper header on harvest. However the problem with this type of harvest is the crops low bulk density of approx 50 – 130 kg/m3. The crop is very bulky and will take up a lot of storage space on harvest. Additionally, storage of chips may be problematic if the chips are too small or too wet as heating may occur. The other potential problem with the miscanthus is due to its fluffy nature in chip form it can potentially bridge or get blocked while feeding into the boiler combustion zone. However a suitable auger feed in mechanism will overcome this issue. [...] When transporting miscanthus in bulk chipped form it can be transported in 96 m3 loads. Most operators report minimum loads of 11.5 tonnes per load at 20% moisture indicating a bulk density of about 120 kg/m3 which equates to €1.60 per GJ of energy delivered." Caslin, Finnan & Easson 2010, pp. 31, 33.) bales 120–160 kg/m^{3} (200–270 lb/cu yd), (Note: "Large rectangular and round balers are capable of producing bales with a dry matter density of between 120 and 160 kg/m3 and weighing between 250 and 600kg." Caslin, Finnan & Easson 2010, p. 22. In addition, Huisman 2001, p. 2098 quotes 250 kg/m3 for high density balers.) while pellets and briquettes have a bulk density of 500 and 600 kg/m^{3} (840 and 1,010 lb/cu yd) respectively. Torrefaction works hand in hand with this trend towards a denser and therefore cheaper to transport product, specifically by increasing the product's energy density. Torrefaction removes (by gasification) the parts of the biomass that has the lowest energy content, while the parts with the highest energy content remain. That is, approximately 30% of the biomass is converted to gas during the torrefaction process (and potentially used to power the process), while 70% remains, usually in the form of compacted pellets or briquettes. This solid product contains approximately 85% of the original biomass energy however. Basically the mass part has shrunk more than the energy part, and the consequence is that the calorific value of torrefied biomass increases significantly, to the extent that it can compete with energy dense coals used for electricity generation (steam/thermal coals). The energy density of the most common steam coals today is 22–26 MJ/kg (2.8–3.3 kWh/lb). Torrefaction can be done "autothermic" (i.e. the required energy is delivered by partial combustion of the to-be-torrefied material) or "heterothermic" (i.e. the required process heat is delivered from outside sources). In the heterothermic case, torrefaction can also serve as an indirect method of energy storage as the material can be torrefied when power is cheap and plentiful and the gaseous and/or solid products can be burned in a peaking power plant when power is scarce. The gaseous products of torrefaction are similar to syngas and can be used for various processes in the chemical industry in a similar fashion as fossil fuels. The high-carbon solid products of torrefaction can be deposited in the soil as biochar (provided the level of various pollutants is low enough) or used to produce hydrogen in the water–gas shift reaction if simply burning it is not desirable.

The higher energy density means lower transportation costs, and a decrease in transport-related greenhouse gas emissions. The IEA has calculated how much energy is saved, and how much greenhouse gas emissions is reduced, when switching from regular to torrefied pellets/briquettes. When making torrefied pellets and shipping them from Indonesia to Japan, the minimum amount of energy that is saved is 6.7%, and the minimum amount of greenhouse gas emissions avoided is 14%. This increases to 10.3% energy use savings and 33% greenhouse gas emission avoidance when making and shipping minimum 50 mm briquettes instead of pellets (briquette production requires less energy). (Note: "Briquetting reduces electricity consumption in densification by almost 50% in respect to pelleting (Personal Communication, Wolfgang Stelte). In this case, the energy consumption advantage of the torrefaction chain versus the WWP chain almost doubles to 10,3%. The GHG advantage increases accordingly, to a 33% reduction of torrefied wood briquettes (TWB) compared to WWP, as can be seen in Figure 9." Wild & Visser 2018, pp. 16–17.) The longer the route, the bigger the savings.

==== Water absorption and transport costs ====
Torrefaction also converts the biomass from a hydrophilic (water absorbing) to a hydrophobic (water repelling) state. Water repelling briquettes can be transported and stored outside, which simplifies the logistics operation and decreases cost. (Note: Torrefied biomass has a moisture content of 1–5%. The reason there is still some moisture in torrefied mass in spite of its hydrophobic quality, is small cracks or fissures in the pellets or briquettes that makes it possible for moisture to enter. Wild 2015, pp. 72, 74.) Torrefaction also stops the biological activity in the biomass (including rotting), and reduces the risk of fire.

==== Uniformity and customization ====
Generally, torrefaction is seen as a gateway for converting a range of very diverse feedstocks into a uniform and therefore easier to deal with fuel. The fuel's parameters can be changed to meet customers demands, for instance type of feedstock, torrefaction degree, geometrical form, durability, water resistance, and ash composition. The possibility to use different types of feedstock improves the fuel's availability and supply reliability.

==== Grindability ====
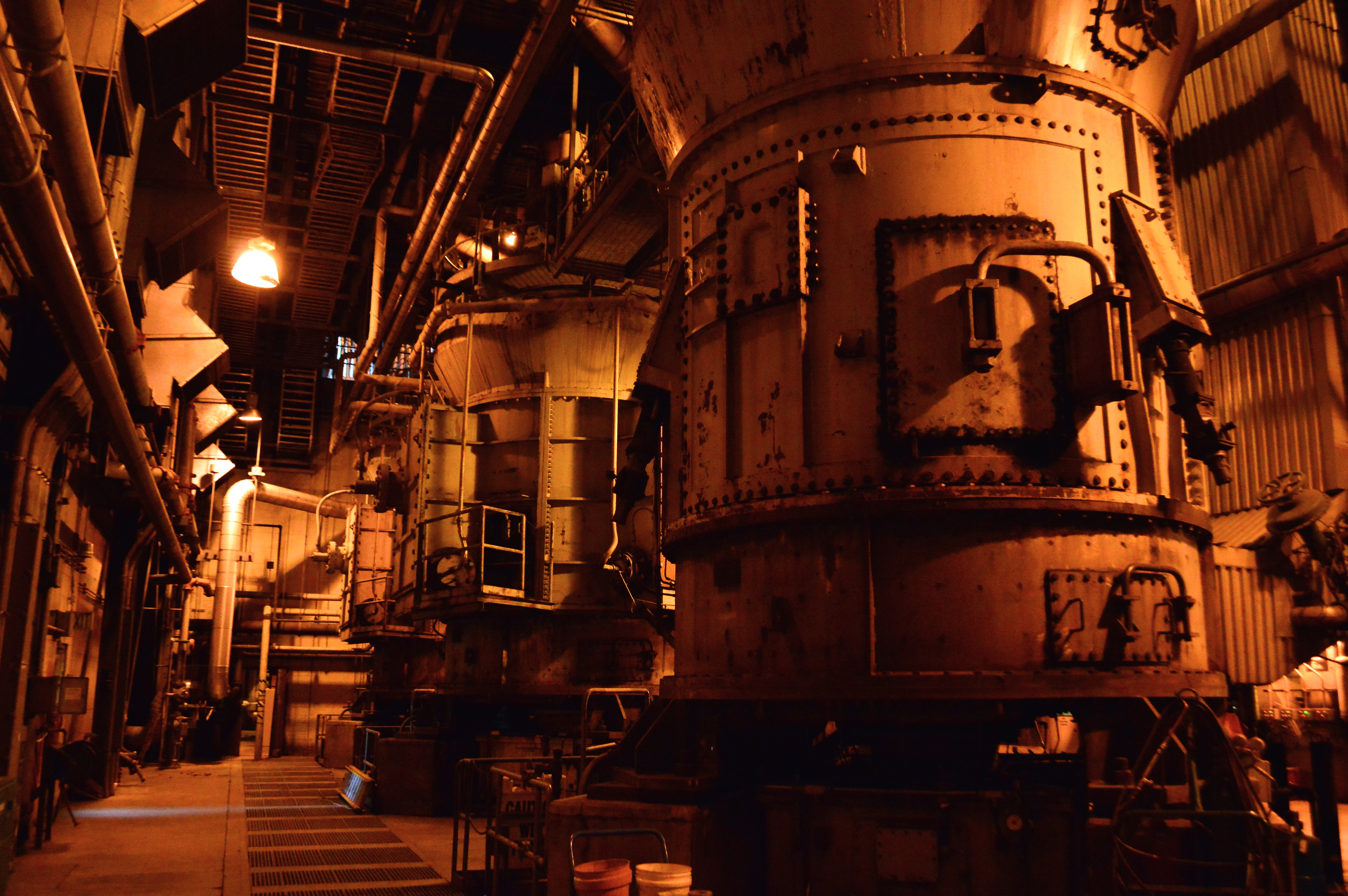
Coal grinders

Unprocessed M. × giganteus has strong fibers, making grinding into equally sized, very small particles (below 75 μm / 0.075 mm) difficult to achieve. Coal chunks are typically ground to that size because such small, even particles combust more stably and efficiently. While coal has a score on the Hardgrove Grindability Index (HGI) of 30–100 (higher numbers mean it is easier to grind), unprocessed miscanthus has a score of 0. (Note: "Flame stability can be further exacerbated by differences in particle size as large particle sizes can act as heat sinks, increasing the resonance time of the particle before ignition and influencing the balance of heat loss and heat release. For a stable flame in a pulverised coal operation, pulverisation of fuel to 70% below 75 μm is typically required. [It is required to reduce at least 70% of the total amount of particles to below 75 μm in size.] The ease in which fuels can be pulverised to 70% below 75 μm is described using the Hardgrove Grindability Index (HGI). Coals typically lie between 30 (increased resistance to pulverization) and 100 (more easily pulverised) on the scale. The HGI for the unprocessed Miscanthus and processed bio-coals are given in Table 3. The unprocessed Miscanthus has an HGI of zero which essentially implies under the test conditions, that no fuel would reach the desired 75 μm and thus, assuming co-milling, there would be either a greater energy requirement for milling to achieve 75 μm or the pulverised fuel particles would be greater than 75 μm in diameter." Smith et al. 2018, p. 551.) During torrefaction however, "[…] the hemi-cellulose fraction which is responsible for the fibrous nature of biomass is degraded, thereby improving its grindability." The IEA estimates a HGI of 23–53 for torrefied biomass in general, and estimates an 80–90% drop in energy use required to grind biomass which has been torrefied. Other researchers have measured a HGI of 79 for torrefied miscanthus. (Note: See Bridgeman et al. 2010, p. 3916. Also, Smith et al. measured a HGI of 150 for Miscanthus pre-treated with hydrothermal carbonisation, sometimes called "wet" torrefaction: "The HGI of 150 (see Table 3) for the samples processed at 250 °C also imply that the fuel will easily pulverise and there should be limited issues with flame stability brought about though larger particle diameters encountered with untreated biomass." Smith et al. 2018, p. 554.) UK coal scores between 40 and 60 on the HGI scale. (Note: "On average, coals used in UK power stations have a HGI around 40–60; the La Loma coal tested in this work falls within this range with a HGI of 46." Williams et al. 2015, p. 382.)

The relatively easy grinding of torrefied miscanthus makes a cost-effective conversion to fine particles possible, which subsequently makes efficient combustion possible. Researchers have found that the level of unburnt carbon decreases when torrefied biomass is used, and that flames "[…] were stable during 50% cofiring and for the 100% case as a result of sufficient fuel particle fineness."

==== Chlorine and corrosion ====
Like many types of biomass except wood, miscanthus biomass has a relatively high chlorine amount, which is problematic in a combustion scenario because, the "[…] likelihood of corrosion depends significantly on the content of chlorine in the fuel […]." Likewise, research show that "[…] the release of Cl-associated [chlorine-associated] species during combustion is the main cause of the induced active corrosion in the grate combustion of biomass." Chlorine in different forms, in particular combined with potassium as potassium chloride, condensates on relatively cooler surfaces inside the boiler and creates a corrosive deposit layer. The corrosion damages the boiler, and in addition the physical deposit layer itself reduce heat transfer efficiency, most critically inside the heat exchange mechanism. (Note: "Inorganics can be a particular issue for Miscanthus during combustion as large amounts of alkali and alkaline metals, particularly potassium and sodium, along with sulphur and chlorine influence ash chemistry and influence the behaviours of the fuel in terms of its tendency to corrode equipment and cause slagging, fouling and in certain furnaces bed agglomeration. [...] Fouling is a phenomenon brought about when potassium and sodium, in combination with chlorine, partially evaporate when exposed to radiant heat and form alkali chlorides which condense on cooler surfaces such as heat exchangers. These deposits don't just reduce heat exchanger efficiency; they also play a major role in corrosion as these deposits can react with sulphur in the flue gas to form alkali sulphates releasing chlorine. This chlorine has a catalytic effect which results in the active oxidation and corrosion of the furnace material." Smith et al. 2018, pp. 554, 556.) Chlorine and potassium also lowers the ash melting point considerably compared to coal. Melted ash, known as slag or clinker, sticks to the bottom of the boiler, and increase maintenance costs. (Note: "In the combustion of miscanthus, the inorganic constituents remain as ash. The typical total ash content of miscanthus is in the range of 2.0% to 3.5%. In grate-fired combustion systems, the coarser ash is discharged as bottom ash while the finer ash fraction leaves the combustion zone with the off-gas as fly ash. Because of the low ash melting temperature, which is strongly correlated with the potassium and chloride content of the ash, the combustion temperature is kept as low as possible." Lanzerstorfer 2019, pp. 1–2.) (Note: "Slagging is a phenomenon brought about though the melting of ash when ash deposits are exposed to radiant heat, such as flames in a furnace. As most furnaces are designed to remove ash as a powdery residue, having a high ash melting temperature is often desirable. Otherwise it has a higher tendency to fuse into a hard glassy slag, known as a clinker, which can be difficult to remove from the furnace. [...] The AFT is a qualitative method of assessing the propensity of a fuel to slag and works by heating an ash test piece and analysing the transitions in the ash chemistry. Key transitions include; (i) shrinkage, which predominantly represents the decomposition of carbonates in hydrothermally derived chars, (ii) deformation temperature, essentially representing the onset point at which the powdery ash starts to agglomerate and starts to stick to surfaces, (iii) hemisphere, whereby ash is agglomerating and is sticky and (v) flow, whereby the ash melts. For most power stations, slagging becomes problematic between the deformation and hemisphere temperature." Smith et al. 2018, p. 554.)

In order to reduce chlorine (and moisture) content, the miscanthus harvest is usually delayed until winter or early spring, but this practice is still not enough of a countermeasure to achieve corrosion-free combustion. (Note: "For Miscanthus to best fit the combustion quality requirements, it is conventionally harvested during the late winter or early spring in the UK, after which the crop has fully senesced and nutrients have been remobilised into the rhizome. [...] Moreover while late harvested Miscanthus samples have improved fuel quality, with lower nitrogen, chlorine, ash and alkaline metal content, the results presented in Baxter et al., [2] indicate that slagging, fouling and corrosion is still most probable in most crops. Thus, the reduction in nutrients brought about by overwintering is still insufficient to lead to safe combustion [...]." Smith et al. 2018, p. 546.)

However, the chlorine amount in miscanthus reduces by approximately 95% when it is torrefied at 350 °C (660 °F). (Note: Saleh 2013, p. 100. Saleh also found an approximate 65% reduction for straw. Likewise, Ren et al. found that "[...] 59.1 wt%, 60.7 wt% and 77.4 wt% of the chlorine contents of olive residues, DDGS and corn straw, respectively, were released during torrefaction". Ren et al. 2017, p. 40.) Chlorine release during the torrefaction process itself is more manageable than chlorine release during combustion, because "[…] the prevailing temperatures during the former process are below the melting and vaporization temperatures of the alkali salts of chlorine, thus minimizing their risks of slagging, fouling and corrosion in furnaces." For potassium, only a 30% reduction is expected. However, potassium is dependent on chlorine to form potassium chloride; with a low level of chlorine, the potassium chloride deposits reduce proportionally. (Note: Johansen et al. found that "[...] Cl [chlorine] is the main facilitator for K [potassium] release through sublimation [direct gas release] of KCl [potassium chloride] [...]." Potassium chloride is the "[...] dominant Cl species found in biomass, [...]" and it remains stable in the solid phase until temperatures reach 700–800 °C. Note that a small amount (5–10 %) of potassium release has been observed at temperatures below 700 °C. At the threshold point, "[...] the high temperature release of K [potassium] in the form of KCl [potassium chloride] is equivalent to the available amount of total Cl [chlorine] in the feedstock fuel." In other words, the "[...] K [potassium] release seems to be limited by the quantity of available Cl [chlorine]." Thus, it is mainly the bonding with chlorine that makes it possible for potassium to become a gas and foul the inside of the combustion equipment; the release of potassium "[...] will cease as the fuel, undergoing pyrolysis or combustion, reaches a state of complete dechlorination." At this point, potassium will instead fuse with silicates and aluminiosilicates at approximately 800 °C, and will be retained in the ash. Johansen et al. 2011, pp. 4961, 4962, 4968.)

==== Coal similarity ====
Researchers therefore argue that the "[…] process of torrefaction transforms the chemical and physical properties of raw biomass into those similar to coal, which enables utilization with high substitution ratios of biomass in existing coal-fired boilers without any major modifications." Torrefaction removes moisture and create a grindable, hydrophobic and solid product with an increased energy density, which means that torrefied fuel no longer requires "[…] separate handling facilities when co-fired with coal in existing power stations." The same compatibility is also achieved for biomass processed by hydrothermal carbonization, sometimes called "wet" torrefaction. (Note: "Recent studies by Reza et al. and Smith et al. have reported of the fate of inorganics and heteroatoms during HTC [hydrothermal carbonisation] of Miscanthus and indicate significant removal of the alkali metals, potassium and sodium, along with chlorine. [...] Analysis of ash melting behaviour in Smith et al., showed a significant reduction in the slagging propensity of the resulting fuel, along with the fouling and corrosion risk combined. [...] Consequently HTC offers the potential to upgrade Miscanthus from a reasonably low value fuel into a high grade fuel, with a high calorific value, improved handling properties and favourable ash chemistry. [...] HTC at 250 °C can overcome slagging issues and increase the ash deformation temperature from 1040 °C to 1320 °C for early harvested Miscanthus. The chemistry also suggests a reduction in fouling and corrosion propensity for both 250 °C treated fuels." Smith et al. 2018, pp. 547, 556.)

Researchers note however that "[…] torrefaction is a more complex process than initially anticipated" and state that "[…] torrefaction of biomass is still an experimental technology […]." Michael Wild, president of the International Biomass Torrefaction Council, stated in 2015 that the torrefaction sector is "[…] in its optimisation phase […]." He mentions process integration, energy and mass efficiency, mechanical compression and product quality as the variables most important to master at this point in the sector's development.

== Environmental impacts ==
=== Carbon neutrality ===
Typically, perennial crops sequester more carbon than annual crops because the root buildup is allowed to continue undisturbed over many years. Also, perennial crops avoid the yearly tillage procedures (plowing, digging) associated with growing annual crops. Tilling helps the soil microbe populations to decompose the available carbon, producing CO_{2}.

Fundamentally, the below-ground carbon accumulation works as a greenhouse gas mitigation tool because it removes carbon from the above-ground carbon circulation (the circulation from plant to atmosphere and back into new plants.) The above-ground circulation is driven by photosynthesis and combustion—first, a plant absorb CO_{2} and assimilates it as carbon in its tissue both above and below ground. When the above-ground carbon is harvested and then burned, the CO_{2} molecule is formed yet again and released back into the atmosphere. Then, an equivalent amount of CO_{2} is absorbed back by next season's growth, and the cycle repeats.

This above-ground cycle has the potential to be carbon neutral, but of course the human involvement in operating and guiding the cycle means additional energy input, often coming from fossil sources. If the fossil energy spent on the operation is high compared to the amount of energy produced, the total CO_{2} footprint can approach, match or even exceed the CO_{2} footprint originating from burning fossil fuels exclusively, as has been shown to be the case for several first-generation biofuel projects. (Note: "The environmental costs and benefits of bioenergy have been the subject of significant debate, particularly for first‐generation biofuels produced from food (e.g. grain and oil seed). Studies have reported life‐cycle GHG savings ranging from an 86% reduction to a 93% increase in GHG emissions compared with fossil fuels (Searchinger et al., 2008; Davis et al., 2009; Liska et al., 2009; Whitaker et al., 2010). In addition, concerns have been raised that N2O emissions from biofuel feedstock cultivation could have been underestimated (Crutzen et al., 2008; Smith & Searchinger, 2012) and that expansion of feedstock cultivation on agricultural land might displace food production onto land with high carbon stocks or high conservation value (i.e. iLUC) creating a carbon debt which could take decades to repay (Fargione et al., 2008). Other studies have shown that direct nitrogen‐related emissions from annual crop feedstocks can be mitigated through optimized management practices (Davis et al., 2013) or that payback times are less significant than proposed (Mello et al., 2014). However, there are still significant concerns over the impacts of iLUC, despite policy developments aimed at reducing the risk of iLUC occurring (Ahlgren & Di Lucia, 2014; Del Grosso et al., 2014)." Whitaker et al. 2018, p. 151.) (Note: "The impact of growing bioenergy and biofuel feedstock crops has been of particular concern, with some suggesting the greenhouse gas (GHG) balance of food crops used for ethanol and biodiesel may be no better or worse than fossil fuels (Fargione et al., 2008; Searchinger et al., 2008). This is controversial, as the allocation of GHG emissions to the management and the use of coproducts can have a large effect on the total carbon footprint of resulting bioenergy products (Whitaker et al., 2010; Davis et al., 2013). The potential consequences of land use change (LUC) to bioenergy on GHG balance through food crop displacement or 'indirect' land use change (iLUC) are also an important consideration (Searchinger et al., 2008)." Milner et al. 2016, pp. 317–318.) (Note: "While the initial premise regarding bioenergy was that carbon recently captured from the atmosphere into plants would deliver an immediate reduction in GHG emission from fossil fuel use, the reality proved less straightforward. Studies suggested that GHG emission from energy crop production and land-use change might outweigh any CO2 mitigation (Searchinger et al., 2008; Lange, 2011). Nitrous oxide (N2O) production, with its powerful global warming potential (GWP), could be a significant factor in offsetting CO2 gains (Crutzen et al., 2008) as well as possible acidification and eutrophication of the surrounding environment (Kim & Dale, 2005). However, not all biomass feedstocks are equal, and most studies critical of bioenergy production are concerned with biofuels produced from annual food crops at high fertilizer cost, sometimes using land cleared from natural ecosystems or in direct competition with food production (Naik et al., 2010). Dedicated perennial energy crops, produced on existing, lower grade, agricultural land, offer a sustainable alternative with significant savings in greenhouse gas emissions and soil carbon sequestration when produced with appropriate management (Crutzen et al., 2008; Hastings et al., 2008, 2012; Cherubini et al., 2009; Dondini et al., 2009a; Don et al., 2012; Zatta et al., 2014; Richter et al., 2015)." McCalmont et al. 2017, p. 490.) Transport fuels might be worse than solid fuels in this regard. (Note: "Significant reductions in GHG emissions have been demonstrated in many LCA studies across a range of bioenergy technologies and scales (Thornley et al., 2009, 2015). The most significant reductions have been noted for heat and power cases. However, some other studies (particularly on transport fuels) have indicated the opposite, that is that bioenergy systems can increase GHG emissions (Smith & Searchinger, 2012) or fail to achieve increasingly stringent GHG savings thresholds. A number of factors drive this variability in calculated savings, but we know that where significant reductions are not achieved or wide variability is reported there is often associated data uncertainty or variations in the LCA methodology applied (Rowe et al., 2011). For example, data uncertainty in soil carbon stock change following LUC has been shown to significantly influence the GHG intensity of biofuel production pathways (Fig. 3), whilst the shorter term radiative forcing impact of black carbon particles from the combustion of biomass and biofuels also represents significant data uncertainty (Bond et al., 2013)." Whitaker et al. 2018, pp. 156–157.)

The problem can be dealt with both from the perspective of increasing the amount of carbon that is stored below ground (see Carbon sequestration, above), and from the perspective of decreasing fossil fuel input to the above-ground operation. If enough carbon is stored below ground, it can compensate for the total lifecycle emissions of a particular biofuel. Likewise, if the above-ground emissions decreases, less below-ground carbon storage is needed for the biofuel to become carbon neutral or negative.

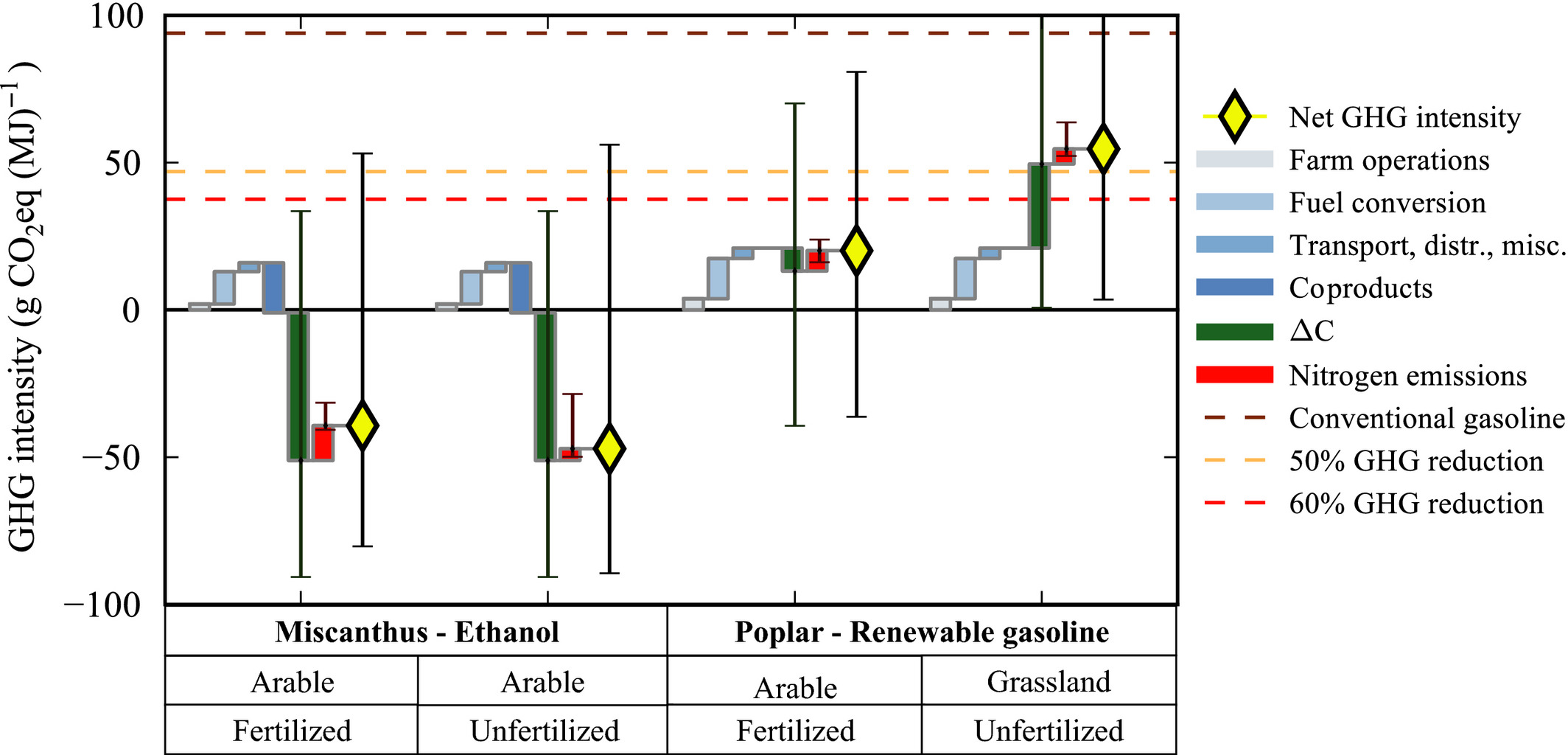
Carbon negative (miscanthus) and carbon positive (poplar) production pathways.

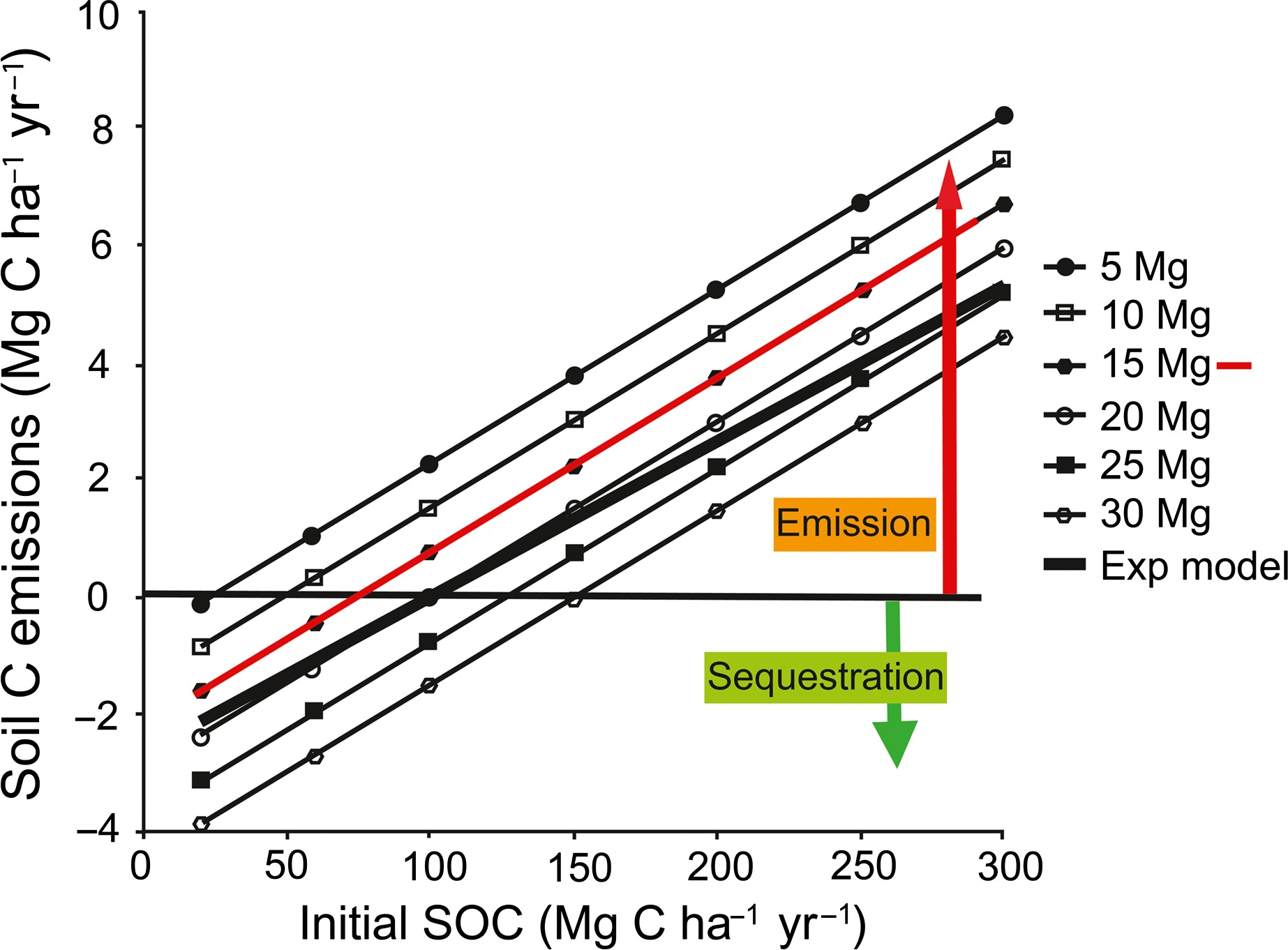
Relationship between above-ground yield (diagonal lines), soil organic carbon (X axis), and soil's potential for successful/unsuccessful carbon sequestration (storage) (Y axis). Basically, the higher the yield, the more land become a CO_{2} negative climate mitigation tool (including relatively carbon rich land.)

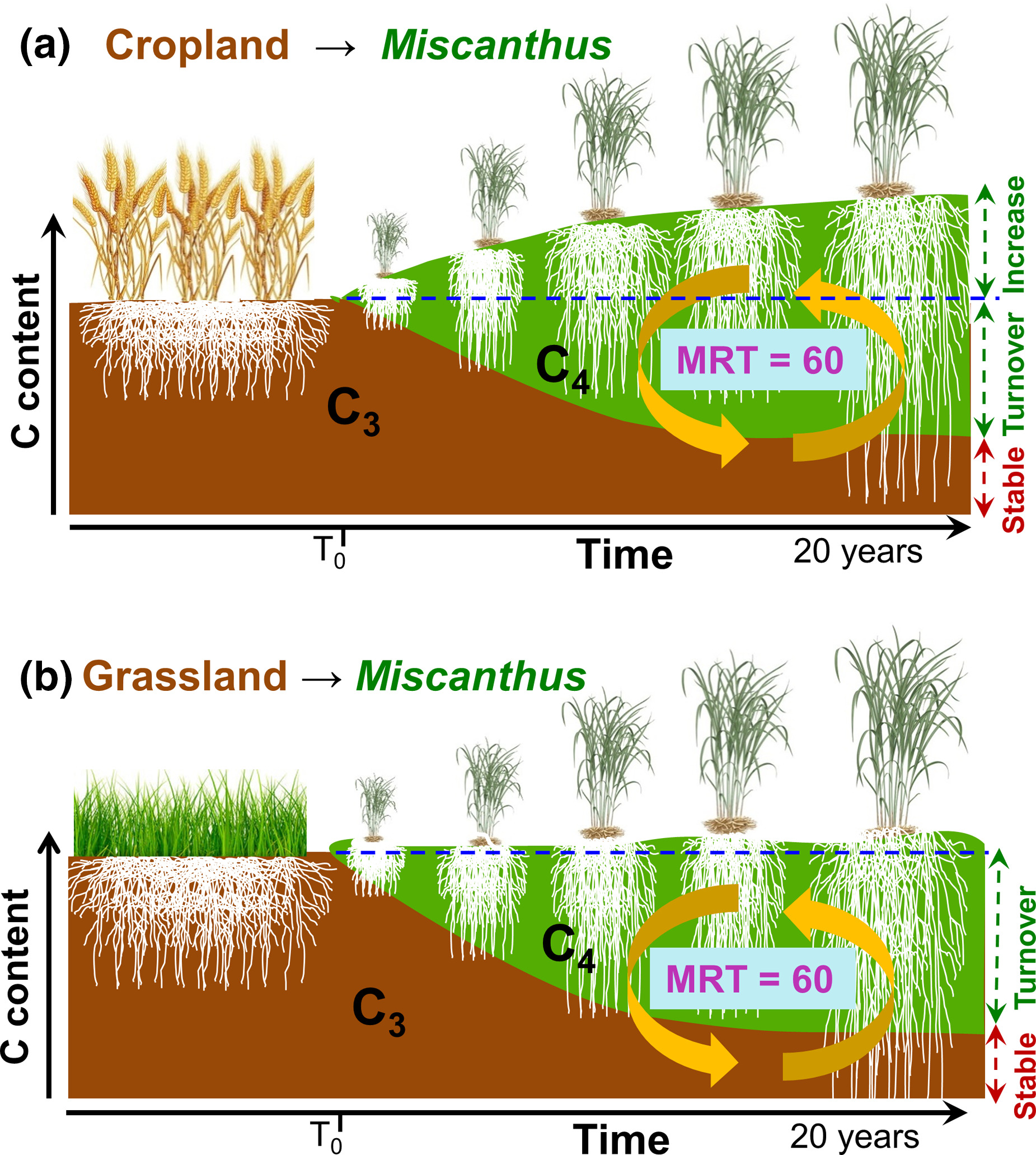
Soil carbon increase when planting micanthus on cropland and grassland.

It is the total amount of CO_{2} equivalent emissions and absorption together that determines if an energy crop project is carbon positive, carbon neutral or carbon negative. If emissions during agriculture, processing, transport and combustion are higher than what is absorbed, both above and below ground during crop growth, the project is carbon positive. Likewise, if total absorption over time is higher than total emissions, the project is carbon negative. To sum up, carbon negativity is possible when net carbon accumulation more than compensates for net lifecycle greenhouse gas emissions.

Researchers argue that a miscanthus crop with a yield of 10 tonnes per hectare per year store enough carbon to compensate for both agriculture, processing and transport related emissions. The chart on the right displays two carbon negative miscanthus production pathways, and two carbon positive poplar production pathways, represented in gram CO_{2}-equivalents per megajoule. The bars are sequential and move up and down as atmospheric CO_{2} is estimated to increase and decrease. The grey/blue bars represent agriculture, processing and transport related emissions, the green bars represents soil carbon change, and the yellow diamonds represent total final emissions. (Note: See Whitaker et al. 2018, p. 156. For calculations, see appendix S1) The second chart displays the mean yields necessary to achieve long-term carbon negativity for soils with different amounts of existing carbon.

Other researchers make the same point for miscanthus in Germany, with a yield of 15 dry tonnes per hectare per year, and carbon storage of 1.1 tonnes per hectare per year:

"Miscanthus is one of the very few crops worldwide that reaches true CO_{2} neutrality and may function as a CO_{2} sink. [...] Related to the combustion of fuel oil, the direct and indirect greenhouse gas emissions can be reduced by a minimum of 96% through the combustion of Miscanthus straw [...]. Due to the C‐sequestration [carbon storage] during Miscanthus growth, this results in a CO_{2}‐eq mitigation potential of 117%". (Note: See Emmerling & Pude 2017, pp. 275–276. Emmerling & Pude paraphrase Felten et al. 2013. For yield, carbon sequestration and GHG calculations, see Felten et al. 2013, pp. 160, 166, 168.)

Successful storage is dependent on planting sites, as the best soils are those that are currently low in carbon. The varied results displayed in the chart highlights this fact. (Note: "Whilst these values represent the extremes, they demonstrate that site selection for bioenergy crop cultivation can make the difference between large GHG [greenhouse gas] savings or losses, shifting life‐cycle GHG emissions above or below mandated thresholds. Reducing uncertainties in ∆C [carbon increase or decrease] following LUC [land use change] is therefore more important than refining N2O [nitrous oxide] emission estimates (Berhongaray et al., 2017). Knowledge on initial soil carbon stocks could improve GHG savings achieved through targeted deployment of perennial bioenergy crops on low carbon soils (see section 2). [...] The assumption that annual cropland provides greater potential for soil carbon sequestration than grassland appears to be over‐simplistic, but there is an opportunity to improve predictions of soil carbon sequestration potential using information on the initial soil carbon stock as a stronger predictor of ∆C [change in carbon amount] than prior land use." Whitaker et al. 2018, pp. 156, 160.) For the UK, successful storage is expected for arable land over most of England and Wales, with unsuccessful storage expected in parts of Scotland, due to already carbon rich soils (existing woodland). Also, for Scotland, the relatively lower yields in this colder climate makes CO_{2} negativity harder to achieve. Soils already rich in carbon include peatland and mature forest. The most successful carbon storage in the UK takes place below improved grassland. (Note: "Fig. 3 confirmed either no change or a gain of SOC [soil organic carbon] (positive) through planting Miscanthus on arable land across England and Wales and only a loss of SOC (negative) in parts of Scotland. The total annual SOC change across GB in the transition from arable to Miscanthus if all nonconstrained land was planted with would be 3.3 Tg C yr^{−1} [3.3 million tonnes carbon per year]. The mean changes for SOC for the different land uses were all positive when histosols were excluded, with improved grasslands yielding the highest Mg C ha^{−1} yr^{−1} [tonnes carbon per hectare per year] at 1.49, followed by arable lands at 1.28 and forest at 1. Separating this SOC change by original land use (Fig. 4) reveals that there are large regions of improved grasslands which, if planted with bioenergy crops, are predicted to result in an increase in SOC. A similar result was found when considering the transition from arable land; however for central eastern England, there was a predicted neutral effect on SOC. Scotland, however, is predicted to have a decrease for all land uses, particularly for woodland due mainly to higher SOC and lower Miscanthus yields and hence less input." Milner et al. 2016, p. 123.) However, since carbon content of grasslands vary considerably, so does the success rate of land use changes from grasslands to perennial. (Note: "In summary, we have quantified the impacts of LUC [land use change] to bioenergy cropping on SOC and GHG balance. This has identified LUC from arable, in general to lead to increased SOC, with LUC from forests to be associated with reduced SOC and enhanced GHG emissions. Grasslands are highly variable and uncertain in their response to LUC to bioenergy and given their widespread occurrence across the temperate landscape, they remain a cause for concern and one of the main areas where future research efforts should be focussed." Harris, Spake & Taylor 2015, p. 37 (see also p. 33 regarding SOC variations). The authors note however that "[t]he average time since transition across all studies was 5.5 years (Xmax 16, Xmin 1) for SOC" and that "[...] the majority of studies considered SOC at the 0–30 cm profile only [...]." Harris, Spake & Taylor 2015, pp. 29–30. Low carbon accumulation rates for young plantations are to be expected, because of accelerated carbon decay at the time of planting (due to soil aeration), and relatively low mean carbon input to the soil during the establishment phase (2–3 years). Also, since dedicated energy crops like miscanthus produce significantly more biomass per year than regular grasslands, and roughly 25% of the carbon content of that biomass is successfully added to the soil carbon stock every year (see Net annual carbon accumulation), it seems reasonable to expect that over time, soil organic carbon will increase also on converted grasslands. The authors quote a carbon building phase of 30–50 years for perennials on converted grasslands, see Harris, Spake & Taylor 2015, p. 31.) Even though the net carbon storage below perennial energy crops like miscanthus greatly exceeds the net carbon storage below grassland, forest and arable crops, carbon input from miscanthus is simply too low to compensate for the loss of existing soil carbon during the early establishment phase. Over time however, soil carbon may increase, also for grassland.

Researchers have ranked the specific land-use-change-related climate benefits (this excludes the climate benefits that originates from replacing fossil fuels) for different crops over a 30 year time frame on different types of grassland, and concludes that native grassland have a climate-related value (called GHGV) of 200, while lightly fertilised M × giganteus crops established on formerly annually tilled soil have a value of 160. CRP grassland have a value of 125 (protected grassland established on former cropland.) Native prairie-mix have a value of 115 (non-fertilised native prairie grasses with other prairie-native species included, established on formerly annually tilled cropland.) Pasture grassland have a value of 72.

=== Comparisons ===
Researchers conclude that miscanthus crops "[…] almost always has a smaller environmental footprint than first generation annual bioenergy ones [...]." (Note: "After centuries of burning wood for energy or processing forage into horse power, the first generation of bioenergy feedstocks were food crops, such as maize, oil seed rape, sugar cane, and oil palm, used to produce bioethanol and biodiesel. These required a high input in terms of fertilizer and energy, which increased their carbon footprint (St. Clair et al., 2008). In addition, the carbon cost of converting the food crop feedstock to bioethanol or biodiesel was significant with a low ratio of energy produced to energy input, high GHG cost and a low productivity in terms of GJ of energy per hectare of land (Hastings et al., 2012). Another drawback of using food crops for energy production is the pressure put on the balance of supply and demand for these feedstocks which can impact the cost of food (Valentine et al., 2011) and the increase of indirect land use change (ILUC) to increase the arable cropped area (Searchinger et al., 2008) which consequentially increases their environmental footprint. The second generation bioenergy crop Miscanthus almost always has a smaller environmental footprint than first generation annual bioenergy ones (Heaton et al., 2004, 2008; Clifton-Brown et al., 2008; Gelfand et al., 2013; McCalmont et al., 2015a; Milner et al., 2015). This is due to its perennial nature, nutrient recycling efficiency and need for less chemical input and soil tillage over its 20-year life-cycle than annual crops (St. Clair et al., 2008; Hastings et al., 2012). Miscanthus can be grown on agricultural land that is economically marginal for food crop production (Clifton-Brown et al., 2015)." Hastings et al. 2017, p. 2.) Second generation perennial grasses (miscanthus and switchgrass) planted on arable land store on average five times more carbon in the ground than short rotation coppice or short rotation forestry plantations (poplar and willow). (Note: "A systematic review and meta-analysis were used to assess the current state of knowledge and quantify the effects of land use change (LUC) to second generation (2G), non-food bioenergy crops on soil organic carbon (SOC) and greenhouse gas (GHG) emissions of relevance to temperate zone agriculture. Following analysis from 138 original studies, transitions from arable to short rotation coppice (SRC, poplar or willow) or perennial grasses (mostly Miscanthus or switchgrass) resulted in increased SOC (+5.0 ± 7.8% and +25.7 ± 6.7% respectively)." Harris, Spake & Taylor 2015, p. 27.) Compared to fossil fuels, and without including the benefits of below-ground carbon storage in the calculation, miscanthus fuel has a greenhouse gas cost of 0.4–1.6 grams CO_{2}-equivalents per megajoule, compared to 33 grams for coal, 22 for liquefied natural gas, 16 for North Sea gas, and 4 for wood chips imported to Britain from the USA. (Note: "Our work shows that crop establishment, yield and harvesting method affect the C. cost of Miscanthus solid fuel which for baled harvesting is 0.4 g CO2 eq. C MJ^{−1} for rhizome establishment and 0.74 g CO2 eq. C MJ^{−1} for seed plug establishment. If the harvested biomass is chipped and pelletized, then the emissions rise to 1.2 and 1.6 g CO2 eq. C MJ^{−1}, respectively. The energy requirements for harvesting and chipping from this study that were used to estimate the GHG emissions are in line with the findings of Meehan et al. (2013). These estimates of GHG emissions for Miscanthus fuel confirm the findings of other Life Cycle Assessment (LCA) studies (e.g., Styles and Jones, 2008) and spatial estimates of GHG savings using Miscanthus fuel (Hastings et al., 2009). They also confirm that Miscanthus has a comparatively small GHG footprint due to its perennial nature, nutrient recycling efficiency and need for less chemical input and soil tillage over its 20-year life-cycle than annual crops (Heaton et al., 2004, 2008; Clifton-Brown et al., 2008; Gelfand et al., 2013; McCalmont et al., 2015a; Milner et al., 2015). In this analysis, we did not consider the GHG flux of soil which was shown to sequester on average in the United Kingdom 0.5 g of C per MJ of Miscanthus derived fuel by McCalmont et al. (2015a). Changes in SOC resulting from the cultivation of Miscanthus depend on the previous land use and associated initial SOC. If high carbon soils such as peatland, permanent grassland, and mature forest are avoided and only arable and rotational grassland with mineral soil is used for Miscanthus then the mean increase in SOC for the first 20-year crop rotation in the United Kingdom is ~ 1–1.4 Mg C ha^{−1} y^{−1} (Milner et al., 2015). In spite of ignoring this additional benefit, these GHG cost estimates compare very favorably with coal (33 g CO2 eq. C MJ^{−1}), North Sea Gas (16), liquefied natural gas (22), and wood chips imported from the United States (4). In addition, although Miscanthus production C. cost is only < 1/16 of the GHG cost of natural gas as a fuel (16–22 g CO2 eq. C MJ-1), it is mostly due to the carbon embedded in the machinery, chemicals and fossil fuel used in its production. As the economy moves away from dependence on these fossil fuels for temperature regulation (heat for glasshouse temperature control or chilling for rhizome storage) or transport, then these GHG costs begin to fall away from bioenergy production. It should be noted, the estimates in this paper do not consider either the potential to sequester C. in the soil nor any impact or ILUC (Hastings et al., 2009)." Hastings et al. 2017, pp. 12–13.)

Other researchers argue that the mean energy input/output ratios for miscanthus is 10 times better than for annual crops, and that greenhouse gas emissions are 20–30 times better than for fossil fuels. (Note: "Perennial Miscanthus has energy output/input ratios 10 times higher (47.3 ± 2.2) than annual crops used for energy (4.7 ± 0.2 to 5.5 ± 0.2), and the total carbon cost of energy production (1.12 g CO2-C eq. MJ^{−1}) is 20–30 times lower than fossil fuels." McCalmont et al. 2017, p. 489.) Miscanthus chips for heating saved 22.3 tonnes of CO_{2} emissions per hectare per year in the UK, while maize for heating and power saved 6.3. Rapeseed for biodiesel saved 3.2. (Note: "The results in Fig. 3c show most of the land in the UK could produce Miscanthus biomass with a carbon index that is substantially lower, at 1.12 g CO2-C equivalent per MJ energy in the furnace, than coal (33), oil (22), LNG (21), Russian gas (20), and North Sea gas (16) (Bond et al., 2014), thus offering large potential GHG savings over comparable fuels even after accounting for variations in their specific energy contents. Felten et al. (2013) found Miscanthus energy production (from propagation to final conversion) to offer far higher potential GHG savings per unit land area when compared to other bioenergy systems. They found Miscanthus (chips for domestic heating) saved 22.3 ± 0.13 Mg [tonnes] CO2-eq ha^{−1} yr^{−1} [CO2 equivalents per hectare per year] compared to rapeseed (biodiesel) at 3.2 ± 0.38 and maize (biomass, electricity, and thermal) at 6.3 ± 0.56." McCalmont et al. 2017, p. 500.) Other researchers have similar conclusions. (Note: "The highest biomass yields as well as the highest GHG- and fossil-energy savings potentials (up to 30.6 t CO2eq/ha*a and 429 GJ/ha*a, respectively) can be achieved on non-marginal sites in Central Europe. On marginal sites limited by cold (Moscow/Russia) or drought (Adana/Turkey) savings of up to 19.2 t CO2eq/ha*a and 273 GJ/ha*a (Moscow) and 24.0 t CO2eq/ha*a and 338 GJ/ha*a (Adana) can be achieved. The GHG and fossil-energy savings are highest where miscanthus biomass is used as construction material (our analysis uses the example of insulation material). A high GHG- and fossil-energy-saving potential was also found for domestic heating on account of the short transportation distance. Pelleting is only advantageous in terms of the minimization of GHG emissions and energy consumption where biomass is transported over a long distance, for example for heat and power production in CHP. Pelleting requires additional energy, but at the same time reduces the energy required for transport due to its higher density. The lowest GHG- and fossil-energy-saving potentials were found for power production via the biogas pathway, followed by bioethanol. However, this result is strongly influenced by the assumptions that (a) only 50% of the available heat is used and (b) transport distance from the field to the biogas plant is relatively long (15 km). A biogas chain with 100% heat utilization and lower transportation distances would perform better. It can be concluded that for power generation from miscanthus biomass, the most favorable pathway is combustion for base load power, and biogas to cover peak loads." Lewandowski et al. 2016, pp. 19–20.) (Note: "The costs and life-cycle assessment of seven miscanthus-based value chains, including small- and large-scale heat and power, ethanol, biogas, and insulation material production, revealed GHG-emission- and fossil-energy-saving potentials of up to 30.6 t CO2eq C ha^{−1} y^{−1} and 429 GJ ha^{−1} y^{−1}, respectively. Transport distance was identified as an important cost factor. Negative carbon mitigation costs of −78€ t−1 CO2eq C were recorded for local biomass use. The OPTIMISC results demonstrate the potential of miscanthus as a crop for marginal sites and provide information and technologies for the commercial implementation of miscanthus-based value chains. [...] The overall biomass transport distance was assumed to be 400 km when bales were transported to the bioethanol plant or to the plant producing insulation material as well as in the value chain 'Combined heat and power (CHP) bales.' For the value chains 'CHP pellets' and 'Heat pellets' the bales were transported 100 km to a pelleting plant and from there the pellets were transported 400 km to the power plants. The average farm-to-field distance was assumed to be 2 km. This transport distance is also assumed for the value chain 'heat chips' in which a utilization of the chips as a biomass fuel on the producing farm was assumed. Because of the higher biomass requirements of the biogas plant an average transport distance of 15 km from field to plant was assumed." Lewandowski et al. 2016, pp. 2, 7.) It is therefore expected that miscanthus plantations will grow large in Europe in the coming decades. In 2021, the UK government declared that land areas set aside for short rotation forestry and perennial energy crops (including miscanthus), will increase from 10.000 up to 704.000 hectares. (Note: "We will establish the amount of land that could be used in the UK for perennial energy crop production and for short rotation forestry (SRF). Existing biomass support schemes (Renewables Obligation, Contracts for Difference, RHI & RTFO) already support the use of perennial energy crops such as short rotation coppice and Miscanthus grown specifically for bioenergy purposes and as a material. However, only a small land area (~10,000 hectares) is cultivated with perennial energy crops in the UK at present, and this is mainly used for heat and electricity generation. Currently, there is little to no use of perennial energy crops for low carbon fuels supported under the RTFO due to a lack of commercial-scale processing capacities to convert these resources cost-efficiently into fuel. [...] The CCC’s 6th Carbon Budget report highlighted the significant potential for perennial energy crops and SRF to contribute towards our carbon budget targets by increasing soil and biomass carbon stocks while also delivering other ecosystem benefits. In their balanced pathway, the CCC suggests that up to 708,000 hectares of land could be dedicated to energy crop production, which has led to an increased interest in the role of perennial energy crops and SRF as biomass feedstocks to deliver GHG savings in the land use and energy sectors. The Defra land use net zero programme, which is currently building a spatial understanding of the land use trade-offs across a number of policy areas, will help determine the potential scale of future availability of domestically grown biomass and their potential for delivering GHG savings in a landscape where land use change will need to be optimised for multiple benefits. This programme will inform our understanding and evidence on the availability and mix of biomass feedstocks for uses across sectors." Department for Business, Energy & Industrial Strategy 2021, pp. 15–16.) Researchers argue that after some initial discussion, there is now (2018) consensus in the scientific community that "[…] the GHG [greenhouse gas] balance of perennial bioenergy crop cultivation will often be favourable […]", also when considering the implicit direct and indirect land use changes. (Note: "In 2015, a workshop was convened with researchers, policymakers and industry/business representatives from the UK, EU and internationally. Outcomes from global research on bioenergy land‐use change were compared to identify areas of consensus, key uncertainties, and research priorities. [...] Our analysis suggests that the direct impacts of dedicated perennial bioenergy crops on soil carbon and nitrous oxide are increasingly well understood and are often consistent with significant life cycle GHG mitigation from bioenergy relative to conventional energy sources. We conclude that the GHG balance of perennial bioenergy crop cultivation will often be favourable, with maximum GHG savings achieved where crops are grown on soils with low carbon stocks and conservative nutrient application, accruing additional environmental benefits such as improved water quality. The analysis reported here demonstrates there is a mature and increasingly comprehensive evidence base on the environmental benefits and risks of bioenergy cultivation which can support the development of a sustainable bioenergy industry." Whitaker et al. 2018, p. 150.)

=== Biodiversity ===
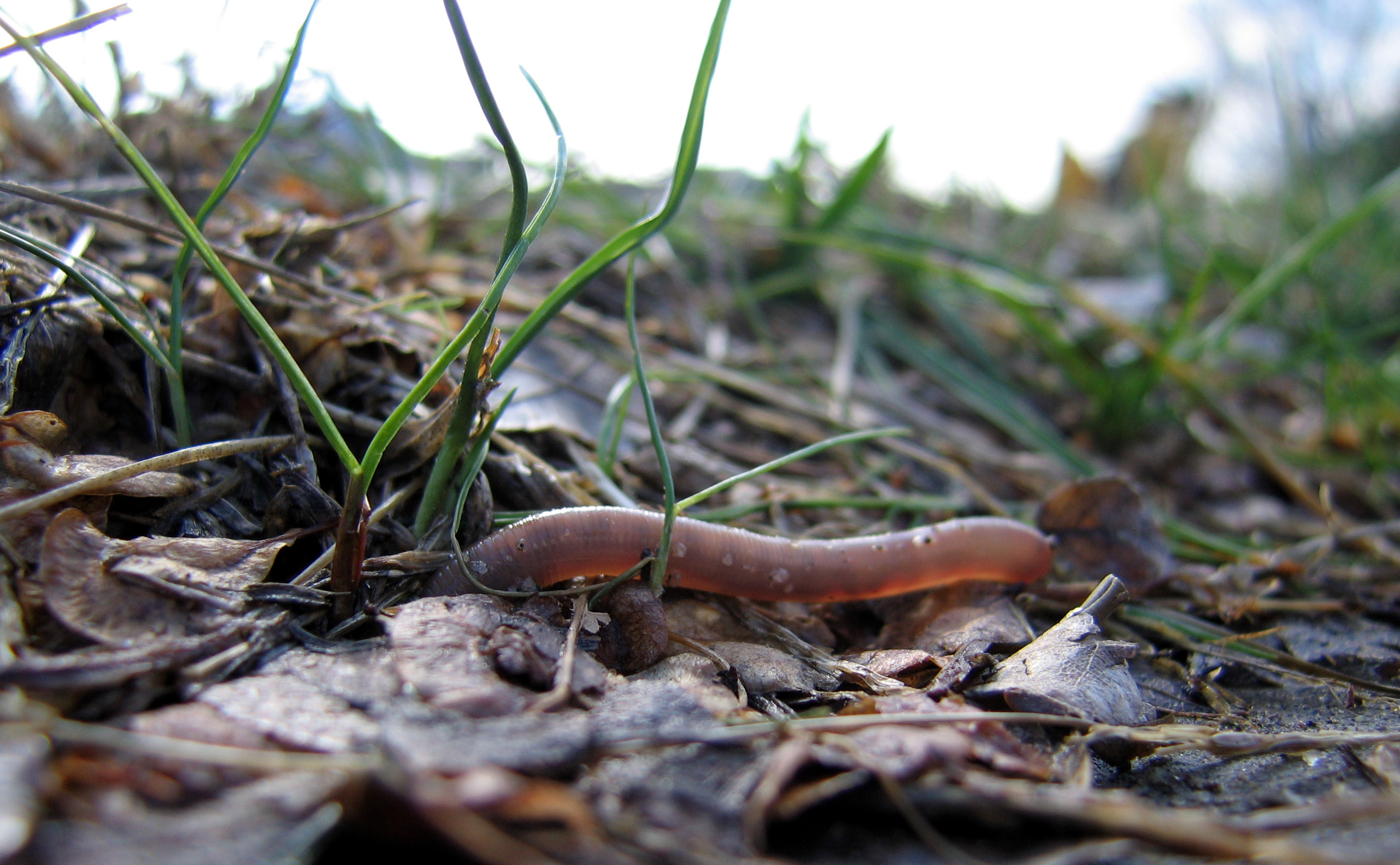
Researchers argue that Miscanthus fields may facilitate a diverse earthworm community even in intensive agricultural landscapes. (Note: "Felten & Emmerling (2011) compared earthworm abundance under a 15‐year‐old Miscanthus plantation in Germany to cereals, maize, OSR, grassland, and a 20‐year‐old fallow site (after previous cereals). Species diversity was higher in Miscanthus than that in annual crops, more in line with grassland or long‐term fallow with management intensity seen to be the most significant factor; the lower ground disturbance allowed earthworms from different ecological categories to develop a more heterogeneous soil structure. The highest number of species was found in the grassland sites (6.8) followed by fallow (6.4), Miscanthus (5.1), OSR (4.0), cereals (3.7), and maize (3.0) with total individual earthworm abundance ranging from 62 m−2 in maize sites to 355 m−2 in fallow with Miscanthus taking a medium position (132 m−2), although differences in abundance were not found to be significant between land uses. There is some trade‐off in this advantage for the earthworms however; the high‐nitrogen‐use efficiency and nutrient cycling which reduces the need for nitrogen fertilizer and its associated environmental harm means that, despite large volumes being available, Miscanthus leaf litter does not provide a particularly useful food resource due to its low‐nitrogen, high‐carbon nature (Ernst et al., 2009; Heaton et al., 2009) and earthworms feeding on this kind of low‐nitrogen material have been found in other studies to lose overall mass (Abbott & Parker, 1981). In contrast, though, the extensive litter cover at ground level under Miscanthus compared to the bare soil under annual cereals was suggested to be a potentially significant advantage for earthworms in soil surface moisture retention and protection from predation." McCalmont et al. 2017, p. 502.)

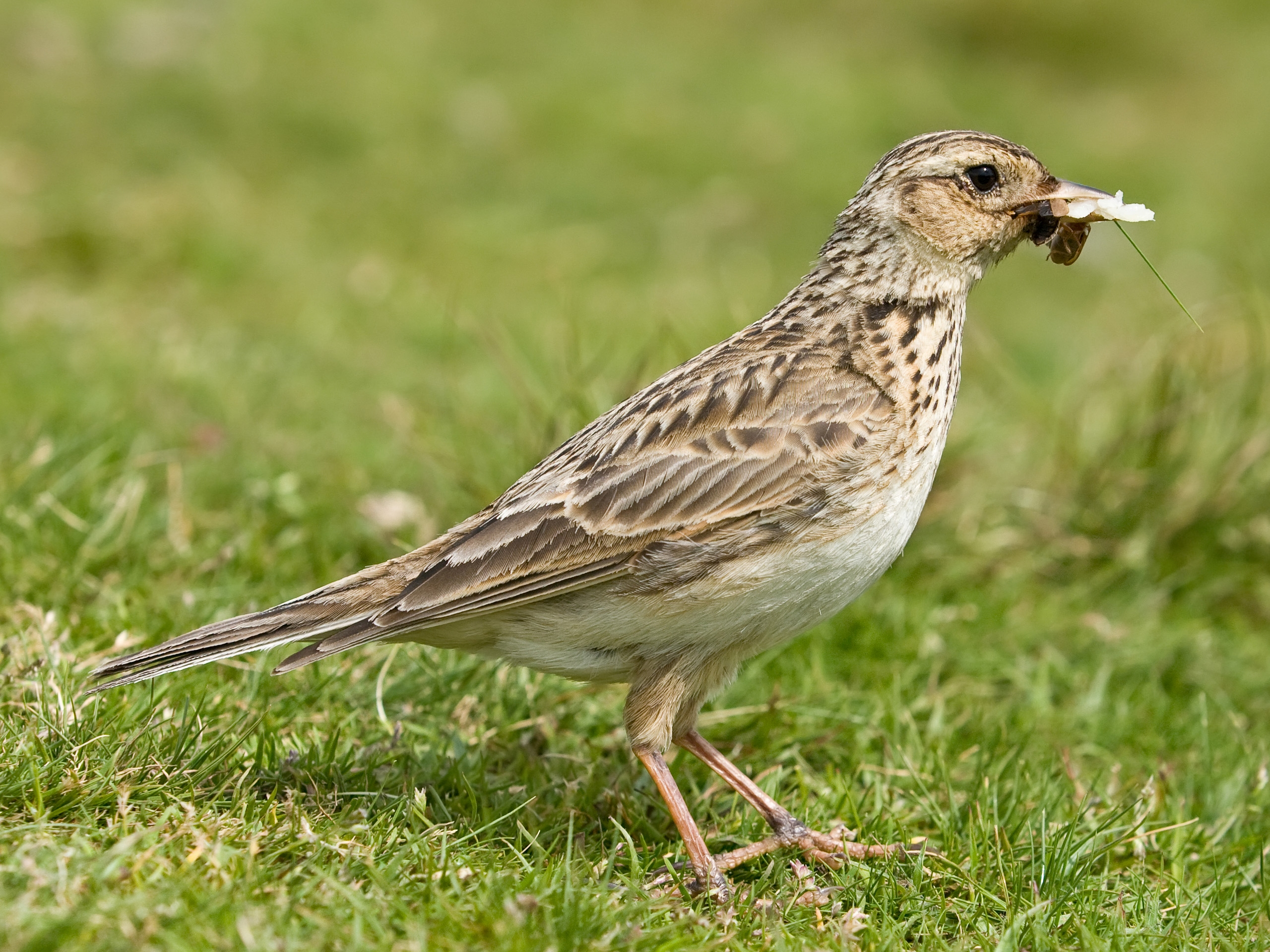
Researchers found breeding skylarks in miscanthus crops. (Note: "Bellamy et al. (2009) looked at bird species and their food resources at six paired sites in Cambridgeshire comparing Miscanthus plantations up to 5 years old with winter wheat rotations in both the winter and summer breeding seasons. The authors found that Miscanthus offered a different ecological niche during each season; most of the frequently occurring species in the winter were woodland birds, whereas no woodland birds were found in the wheat; in summer, however, farmland birds were more numerous. More than half the species occurring across the sites were more numerous in the Miscanthus, 24 species recorded compared to 11 for wheat. During the breeding season, there was once again double the number of species found at the Miscanthus sites with individual abundances being higher for all species except skylark. Considering only birds whose breeding territories were either wholly or partially within crop boundaries, a total of seven species were found in the Miscanthus compared to five in the wheat with greater density of breeding pairs (1.8 vs. 0.59 species ha^{−1}) and also breeding species (0.92 vs. 0.28 species ha^{−1}). Two species were at statistically significant higher densities in the Miscanthus compared to wheat, and none were found at higher densities in the wheat compared to Miscanthus. As discussed, the structural heterogeneity, both spatially and temporally, plays an important role in determining within‐crop biodiversity, autumn‐sown winter wheat offers little overwinter shelter with ground cover averaging 0.08 m tall and very few noncrop plants, whereas the Miscanthus, at around 2 m, offered far more. In the breeding season, this difference between the crops remained evident; the wheat fields provided a uniform, dense crop cover throughout the breeding season with only tram lines producing breaks, whereas the Miscanthus had a low open structure early in the season rapidly increasing in height and density as the season progressed. Numbers of birds declined as the crop grew with two bird species in particular showing close (though opposite) correlation between abundance and crop height; red‐legged partridge declined as the crop grew, whereas reed warblers increased, and these warblers were not found in the crop until it had passed 1 m in height, even though they were present in neighbouring OSR fields and vegetated ditches. In conclusion, the authors point out that, for all species combined, bird densities in Miscanthus were similar to those found in other studies looking at SRC willow and set‐aside fields, all sites had greater bird densities than conventional arable crops. It is through these added resources to an intensive agricultural landscape and reductions in chemical and mechanical pressure on field margins that Miscanthus can play an important role in supporting biodiversity but must be considered complementary to existing systems and the wildlife that has adapted to it. Clapham et al. (2008) reports, as do the other studies here, that in an agricultural landscape, it is in the field margins and interspersed woodland that the majority of the wildlife and their food resources are to be found, and the important role that Miscanthus can play in this landscape is the cessation of chemical leaching into these key habitats, the removal of annual ground disturbance and soil erosion, improved water quality, and the provision of heterogeneous structure and overwinter cover." McCalmont et al. 2017, pp. 502–503.)

Below ground, researchers have found that the number of earthworm species per square metre was 5.1 for miscanthus, 3 for maize, and 6.4 for fallow (totally unattended land), and state that "[…] it was clearly found that land-use intensity was the dominant regressor for earthworm abundance and total number of species." Because the extensive leaf litter on the ground helps the soil to stay moist, and also protect from predators, they conclude that "[…] Miscanthus had quite positive effects on earthworm communities […]" and recommend that "[…] Miscanthus may facilitate a diverse earthworm community even in intensive agricultural landscapes." Others argue that the activity of certain bacteria belonging to the Pseudomonadota (formerly proteobacteria) group almost doubles in the presence of M. × giganteus root exudates.

Above ground, young miscanthus stands sustain high plant species diversity, but as the miscanthus stands mature, the canopy closes, and less sunlight reach the competing weeds. In this situation it gets harder for the weeds to survive. After canopy closure, 16 different weed species per 25 m^{2} plot was found. The dense canopy works as protection for other life-forms though; "[…] Miscanthus stands are usually reported to support farm biodiversity, providing habitat for birds, insects, and small mammals […]." (Note: "Our results show that young miscanthus stands sustain high plant species diversity before the canopy closure. Species richness was found to correlate negatively with the density of the stands and to be lower in mature plantations. However, even the 16-year-old, dense miscanthus plantations supported up to 16 different weed species per 25-m2 plot, accounting for up to 12% of the plantation. The literature data support this finding: Miscanthus stands are usually reported to support farm biodiversity, providing habitat for birds, insects, and small mammals (Semere and Slater, 2007a; Bellamy et al., 2009). Studies by Semere and Slater (2007b) have shown biodiversity in miscanthus to be higher than in other crop stands, but still lower than in open field margins." Lewandowski et al. 2016, p. 15.) Supporting this view, other researchers argue that the flora below the canopy provides food for butterflies, other insects and their predators, and 40 species of birds. (Note: "The diverse ground flora which can inhabit the soil beneath a mature miscanthus canopy will provide food for butterflies, other insects and their predators. Skylarks, meadow pipits and lapwings use miscanthus, as well as 37 other species of birds including wren, linnet and goldfinch that feed on the grass seeds. Once the leaves are shed in winter, a suitable habitat is provided for yellowhammers. Open areas between stools provide ideal habitat for birds such as skylarks and meadow pipits." Caslin, Finnan & Easson 2010, p. 37.)

The miscanthus overwinter vegetative structure provide an important cover and habitat resource, with high levels of diversity in comparison with annual crops. (Note: "Our study suggests that miscanthus and SRC willows, and the management associated with perennial cropping, would support significant amounts of biodiversity when compared with annual arable crops. We recommend the strategic planting of these perennial, dedicated biomass crops in arable farmland to increase landscape heterogeneity and enhance ecosystem function, and simultaneously work towards striking a balance between energy and food security." Haughton et al. 2016, p. 1071.) This effect is particularly evident for beetles, flies, and birds. The miscanthus crop offers a different ecological niche for each season—researchers attribute this to the continually evolving structural heterogeneity of a miscanthus crop, with different species finding shelter at different times during its development—woodland birds find shelter in the winter and farmland birds in the summer. For birds, 0.92 breeding pairs species per hectare (0.37 per acre) was found in a miscanthus field, compared to 0.28 (0.11) in a nearby wheat field. Due to the high carbon to nitrogen ratio, it is in the field's margins and interspersed woodlands that the majority of the food resources are to be found. Miscanthus fields work as barriers against chemical leaching into these key habitats however.

Other researchers argue that miscanthus crops provide better biodiversity than cereal crops, with three times as many spiders and earthworms as cereal. (Note: "Two studies, one at IACR-Rothamsted and another in Germany, comparing miscanthus with cereals, indicated that miscanthus seemed to provide a habitat which encourages a greater diversity of species than cereal crops. In these studies three times as many earthworms and spiders were found in the miscanthus crop, miscanthus also supported a greater diversity of spider species. One of the studies also showed that the miscanthus crop had 5 more mammal species and 4 more bird species than a crop of wheat. Spink and Britt (1998) identified miscanthus to be one of the most environmentally benign alternatives to permanent set-aside." Caslin, Finnan & Easson 2010, p. 36.) Brown hare, stoat, mice, vole, shrew, fox and rabbit are some of the species that are observed in miscanthus crops. The crop act as both a nesting habitat and a wildlife corridor connecting different habitats. (Note: "Miscanthus provides cover for most of the year because, although the crop is harvested annually, it is harvested shortly before the following year's growth begins. This cover can act as a wildlife corridor linking existing habitats. Miscanthus can also act as a nesting habitat, for both ground nesting birds in the early spring e.g. sky larks, and reed nesting birds such as the reed warbler, later in the summer. Miscanthus might be a useful game cover crop and nursery for young pheasants and partridges. A minimum of nine species have been observed in miscanthus, including the brown hare, stoat, mice, vole, shrew, fox and rabbit. Many of these are a useful source of food for larger carnivores such as the barn owl." Caslin, Finnan & Easson 2010, p. 36.)

=== Water quality ===
Miscanthus fields leads to significantly improved water quality because of significantly less nitrate leaching. (Note: "There is also a benefit of reduced chemical inputs and nitrate leaching associated with Miscanthus, significantly improving water quality running off farmland (Christian & Riche, 1998; Curley et al., 2009). McIsaac et al. (2010) reported that inorganic N leaching was significantly lower under unfertilized Miscanthus (1.5–6.6 kg N ha^{−1} yr^{−1}) than a maize/soya bean rotation (34.2–45.9 kg N ha^{−1} yr^{−1})." McCalmont et al. 2017, p. 501.) There is drastically reduced nitrate leaching from miscanthus fields compared to the typical maize/soy rotation because of low or zero fertilizer requirements, the continuous presence of a plant root sink for nitrogen, and the efficient internal recycling of nutrients by perennial grass species. A recent study concluded that miscanthus had on average nine times less subsurface loss of nitrate compared to maize or maize grown in rotation with soya bean. (Note: "Significant reductions in leaching of dissolved inorganic nitrogen on a land surface basis are predicted to occur if land already growing maize for ethanol production is converted to a perennial feedstock (Davis et al., 2012; Iqbal et al., 2015). This reduction in leaching is attributed to lower fertilizer requirements, the continuous presence of a plant root sink for nitrogen, and the efficient internal recycling of nutrients by perennial grass species (Amougou et al., 2012; Smith et al., 2013). In support of this, Miscanthus and switchgrass assessed at a plot scale had significantly lower dissolved inorganic nitrogen leaching from subterranean drainage tiles relative to the typical maize/soy rotation, with fertilized plots of switchgrass showing little or no leaching after reaching maturity (Smith et al., 2013). Similarly, results from soil‐based measurements in the same feedstocks showed lower dissolved inorganic nitrogen relative to annual crops (McIsaac et al., 2010; Behnke et al., 2012). A recent meta‐analysis of the available literature concluded that switchgrass and Miscanthus had nine times less subsurface loss of nitrate compared to maize or maize grown in rotation with soya bean (Sharma & Chaubey, 2017). At the basin scale, displacement of maize production for ethanol by cellulosic perennial feedstock production could reduce total leaching by up to 22%, depending on the type of feedstock and management practice employed (Davis et al., 2012; Smith et al., 2013). While these previous studies provide evidence for the potential ecosystem services of transitioning to cellulosic production, it is yet to be established what the total change to dissolved inorganic nitrogen export and streamflow would be under such scenarios. Hydrological processes are tightly coupled to the nitrogen cycle (Castellano et al., 2010, 2013), are key drivers of dissolved inorganic nitrogen transport through streams and rivers (Donner et al., 2002), and are sensitive to LUC (Twine et al., 2004). Various modelling scenarios, where current land cover over the Mississippi River Basin of the United States was altered to accommodate varying proportions of switchgrass or Miscanthus, showed that the impact on streamflow was small relative to the improvement in water quality (VanLoocke et al., 2017)." Whitaker et al. 2018, pp. 157–158.)

=== Soil quality ===
The fibrous, extensive miscanthus rooting system and the lack of tillage disturbance improves infiltration, hydraulic conductivity and water storage compared to annual row crops, and results in the porous and low bulk density soil typical under perennial grasses, with water holding capabilities expected to increase by 100–150 mm. (Note: "Blanco-Canqui (2010) point out that this water-use and nutrient efficiency can be a boon on compacted, poorly drained acid soils, highlighting their possible suitability for marginal agricultural land. The greater porosity and lower bulk density of soils under perennial energy grasses, resulting from more fibrous, extensive rooting systems, and reduced ground disturbance, improves soil hydraulic properties, infiltration, hydraulic conductivity, and water storage compared to annual row crops. There may be potentially large impacts on soil water where plantation size is mismatched to water catchment or irrigation availability but note that increased ET and improved ground water storage through increased porosity could be beneficial during high rainfall with storage capability potentially increased by 100 to 150 mm." McCalmont et al. 2017, p. 501.) Miscanthus improves carbon input to the soil, and promote microorganism activity and diversity, which are important for soil particle aggregation and rehabilitation processes. On a former fly ash deposit site, with alkaline pH, nutrient deficiency, and little water-holding capacity, a miscanthus crop was successfully established—in the sense that the roots and rhizomes grew quite well, supporting and enhancing nitrification processes, although the above-ground dry weight yield was low because of the conditions. The ability to improve soil quality even on contaminated land is seen as a useful feature, especially in a situation where organic amendments can be added. For instance, there is a great potential to increase yield on contaminated marginal land low in nutrients by fertilizing it with nutrient-rich sewage sludge or wastewater. This practice offer the three-fold advantage of improving soil productivity, increasing biomass yields, and reducing costs for treatment and disposal of sewage sludge in line with the specific legislation in each country.

=== Invasiveness ===
Miscanthus × giganteus parents on both sides, M. sinensis and M. sacchariflorus, are both potentially invasive species, because they both produce viable seeds. M. × giganteus does not produce viable seeds however, and researchers claim that "[...] there has been no report on the threat of invasion due to rhizome growth extension from long-term commercial plantations to neighbouring arable land."

=== Sustainability ===
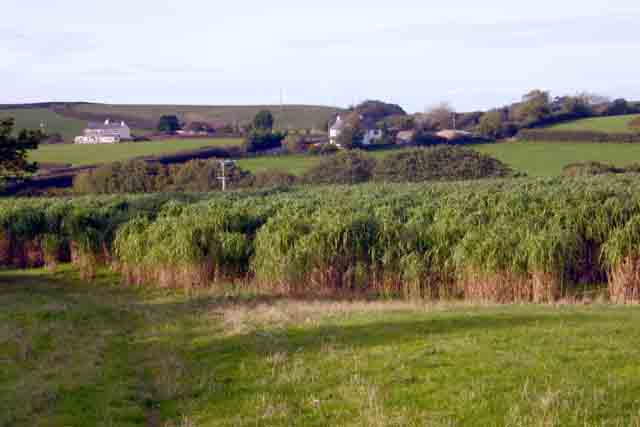
Miscanthus test crop in England.

Researchers argue that analyses "[...] of the environmental impacts of miscanthus cultivation on a range of factors, including greenhouse gas mitigation, show that the benefits outweigh the costs in most cases." Others argue that although there is room for more research, "[...] clear indications of environmental sustainability do emerge." (Note: "This study distils a large body of literature into simple statements around the environmental costs and benefits of producing Miscanthus in the UK, and while there is scope for further research, particularly around hydrology at a commercial scale, biodiversity in older plantations or higher frequency sampling for N2O in land-use transitions to and from Miscanthus, clear indications of environmental sustainability do emerge. Any agricultural production is primarily based on human demand, and there will always be a trade-off between nature and humanity or one benefit and another; however, the literature suggests that Miscanthus can provide a range of benefits while minimizing environmental harm. Consideration must be given to appropriateness of plantation size and location, whether there will be enough water to sustain its production and the environmental cost of transportation to end-users; its role as a long-term perennial crop in a landscape of rotational agriculture must be understood so as not to interfere with essential food production. There is nothing new in these considerations, they lie at the heart of any agricultural policy, and decision-makers are familiar with these issues; the environmental evidence gathered here will help provide the scientific basis to underpin future agricultural policy." McCalmont et al. 2017, p. 504.) In addition to the greenhouse gas mitigation potential, miscanthus' "[…] perennial nature and belowground biomass improves soil structure, increases water-holding capacity (up by 100–150 millimetres (3.9–5.9 in)), and reduces run-off and erosion. Overwinter ripening increases landscape structural resources for wildlife. Reduced management intensity promotes earthworm diversity and abundance although poor litter palatability may reduce individual biomass. Chemical leaching into field boundaries is lower than comparable agriculture, improving soil and water habitat quality." A change from first generation to second generation energy crops like miscanthus is environmentally beneficial because of improved farm-scale biodiversity, predation and a net positive greenhouse gas mitigation effect. The benefits are primarily a consequence of low inputs and the longer management cycles associated with second generation (2G) crops. (Note: "The approach to evaluating ES [ecosystem services] suggests that the growth of 2G bioenergy crops across GB broadly produces beneficial effects when replacing first‐generation crops (Table 1). Beneficial effects on the overall ecosystem rather than specific ES are in agreement with recent reports in the literature (Semere & Slater, 2007a,b; Rowe et al., 2009; Dauber et al., 2010). Benefits of a transition to 2G crops include increased farm‐scale biodiversity (Rowe et al., 2011), improved functional attributes such as predation (Rowe et al., 2013) and a net GHG mitigation benefit (Hillier et al., 2009). Benefits are primarily consequence of low inputs and longer management cycles associated with 2G crops (Clifton‐Brown et al., 2008; St Clair et al., 2008). The benefits may have distinct temporal patterns as establishment and harvest phases of 2G crop production are disruptive and have a short‐term negative impact on ES (Donnelly et al., 2011), although practices could be tailored to ameliorate these; however, this temporal effect has not been considered here and is similar to harvesting and planting food crops, grass or trees. [...] When land is filtered for different planting scenarios under ALC 3 and 4, >92.3% available land will offer a positive ES effect when planting Miscanthus or SRC and such transitions are likely to create a net improvement in GHG balance." Milner et al. 2016, pp. 328–329.) (Note: "[S]outh‐west and north‐west England were identified as areas where Miscanthus and SRC [short rotation coppice] could be grown, respectively, with favourable combinations of economic viability, carbon sequestration, high yield and positive ES [ecosystem services] benefits. Beneficial impacts were found on 146 583 and 71 890 ha when planting Miscanthus or SRC, respectively, under baseline planting conditions rising to 293 247 and 91 318 ha, respectively, under 2020 planting scenarios. [...] In Great Britain (GB), there are approximately 22.9 M ha of land in total (Lovett et al., 2014). [...] The land available for planting was calculated using constraints maps produced by Lovett et al. (2014) using social and environmental constraints based on 8 factors: road, river and urban areas; slope > 15%; monuments; designated areas; existing protected woodlands; high organic carbon soils; and areas with a high 'naturalness score' such as National Parks and Areas of Outstanding Natural Beauty. This land availability was further constrained using agricultural land classes (ALC) (Lovett et al., 2014) in GB as summarized in Table 7, accomplished by aggregating a map of the ALC data at 100 m2 raster resolution to derive total hectares of land in different ALC in each 1 km2 grid cell." Milner et al. 2016, pp. 317, 320.) If land use tensions are mitigated, reasonable yields obtained, and low carbon soils targeted, there are many cases where low-input perennial crops like miscanthus "[...] can provide significant GHG [greenhouse gas] savings compared to fossil fuel alternatives [...]." (Note: "[...] [E]vidence does indicate that the use of low‐input perennial crops, such as SRC, Miscanthus and switchgrass, can provide significant GHG savings compared to fossil fuel alternatives provided that reasonable yields are obtained, low carbon soils are targeted (see sections 2 and 3 above), and the development context is one where tension with land use for food (and associated potential for iLUC emissions) is mitigated. There are many cases where these criteria are satisfied." Whitaker et al. 2018, p. 157.) In contrast to annual crops, miscanthus have low nitrogen input requirements, low GHG emissions, sequesters soil carbon due to reduced tillage, and can be economically viable on marginal land. (Note: "In contrast to annual crops, bioenergy from dedicated perennial crops is widely perceived to have lower life‐cycle GHG emissions and other environmental cobenefits (Rowe et al., 2009; Creutzig et al., 2015). Perennial crops such as Miscanthus and short‐rotation coppice (SRC) willow and poplar have low nitrogen input requirements (with benefits for N2O emissions and water quality), can sequester soil carbon due to reduced tillage and increased belowground biomass allocation, and can be economically viable on marginal and degraded land, thus minimizing competition with other agricultural activities and avoiding iLUC effects (Hudiburg et al., 2015; Carvalho et al., 2017). With respect to the perennial crop sugarcane, large GHG savings can be achieved due to high crop productivity and the use of residues for cogeneration of electricity, whilst the recent shift to mechanized harvest without burning in Brazil should also increase the potential for soil carbon sequestration (Silva‐Olaya et al., 2017). Nevertheless, the site‐level impacts of perennial crop cultivation on ecosystem carbon storage (resulting from dLUC) vary geographically, dependent on soil type and climate (Field et al., 2016)." Whitaker et al. 2018, p. 151.) Researchers agree that in recent years, "[...] a more nuanced understanding of the environmental benefits and risks of bioenergy has emerged, and it has become clear that perennial bioenergy crops have far greater potential to deliver significant GHG savings than the conventional crops currently being grown for biofuel production around the world (e.g. corn, palm oil and oilseed rape)." (Note: "In the rush to pursue climate change mitigation strategies, the 'carbon neutrality' of bioenergy was not rigorously assessed. As more studies began to include assessment of dLUC and iLUC impacts, the credibility of first‐generation bioenergy as an environmentally sustainable, renewable energy source was damaged. In recent years, a more nuanced understanding of the environmental benefits and risks of bioenergy has emerged, and it has become clear that perennial bioenergy crops have far greater potential to deliver significant GHG savings than the conventional crops currently being grown for biofuel production around the world (e.g. corn, palm oil and oilseed rape). Furthermore, the increasingly stringent GHG savings thresholds for biofuels and bioenergy being introduced in Europe (Council Corrigendum 2016/0382(COD)) and the US (110th Congress of the United States 2007) are providing increased impetus for this transition to perennial bioenergy crops." Whitaker et al. 2018, p. 160.) They also agree that "[...] the direct impacts of dedicated perennial bioenergy crops on soil carbon and N2O are increasingly well understood, and are often consistent with significant lifecycle GHG mitigation from bioenergy relative to conventional energy sources."

== Practical farming considerations ==
For practical farming advice, see Iowa State University's "Giant Miscanthus Establishment" PDF. See also the best practice manual jointly developed by Teagasc (the agriculture and food development authority in Ireland) and AFBI (the Agri-Food and Biosciences Institute, also Ireland).
