= Inbicon =

Inbicon is a Danish company that produces cellulosic ethanol.

== History ==
Elsam, a Danish power company, began looking at using biomass for the production of energy in the 1990s. The first pilot plant was opened in 2003, and it could process 2.4 metric tons of biomass/day. By 2005, the pilot plant was scaled up and could process 24 metric tons/day. Elsam, along with six other companies, merged to form DONG Energy, in 2006. In 2007, Inbicon was formed as a separate subsidiary of DONG Energy. The first Inbicon biomass refinery was opened at Kalundborg in 2009 and processed Danish wheat straw to second-generation fuel ethanol. The Inbicon refinery operated for five years demonstrating the efficacy of the technology and the process design obtaining a nameplate capacity commercial scale operation. The refinery marketed its low-carbon renewable liquid fuel to 99 Statoil stations in Denmark during that time. After 5 years of operation DONG Energy, now Ørsted, considered the technology matured and ceased operation at the Inbicon Commercial Demonstration refinery. In August 2019, New Energy Blue, an American company whose founding partners and a US-based process engineering company, Applied Process Solutions (APS), worked on the Inbicon technology and lead business development and Front End Engineering Design to large-scale commercial production since 2009, purchased the exclusive rights to the technology license to the Americas (Inbicon Americas). New Energy Blue has performed feasibility studies to multiple sites in the American Midwest where agricultural residues (wheat straw, corn stover) are abundant to supply these future commercial operations within a 50-mile radius from each site. New Energy Blue expects to build out at multiple sites to supply low carbon fuel supply demands such as the state of California and the country of Canada.

== Feed stock ==
The optimal biomass feedstock the company's technology is designed for is wheat straw. However, they have also tested corn stover, grasses, sugar bagasse, arundo, sorghum, and palm oil residue. Therefore, it is an adaptable process that can utilize the most profitable feedstock.

== Pretreatment processes ==
Inbicon utilizes a hydrothermal pretreatment process after the mechanical conditioning of the feedstock. The premise of this process is to produce a fibre fraction and a liquid fraction through an extraction using hot water. In the fibre fraction this process achieves greater than 80% of the lignin present in the initial feedstock. Whereas the liquid fraction contains: C5 sugars, alkali chlorides and fermentation inhibitors. The main fermentation inhibitor present is acetic acid. However, the fermentation inhibitors can later be removed through detoxification with NH_{3} at a feasible cost. Since this pretreatment process does not use acids or bases and only water it eliminates the need to extract pretreatment chemicals once completed. During the initial step of the hydrothermal pretreatment process the feedstock is soaked and simultaneously placed in temperatures of up to 100 °C and ambient pressure. This allows for the extraction of air present and saturates the feedstock with water. The next step entails a pressurized treatment at elevated temperatures in the range of 170 to 230 °C through the addition of hot water or steam for approximately 5–15 minutes. This pressurized treatment can be repeated at altered temperatures and pressures in different zones increasing each subsequent time, therefore, labeled as a counter-current process. The steam released during the hydrothermal pre-treatment process is collected and reused in downstream evaporation processes. Throughout the hydrothermal pretreatment, there are acids formed that causes the fibre fraction to be nearly neutral in pH. The main benefit of this is that the pH will have to barely be adjusted for enzymatic liquefaction.

The idea behind Inbicon's hydrothermal pretreatment is not to remove the hemicellulose and lignin from the fibre fraction but to nullify its protection of cellulose. Even though Inbicon makes it clear that it refuses to be bound to a theory. They reason that when lignin is melted in the presence of water, because of its hydrophobic nature it will form micro-droplets that solidify at lower temperatures. The conditions used in the pretreatment also hydrolyze hemicellulose. Therefore, the creation of these lignin micro-droplets and the hydrolysis of hemicellulose neutralize the two components protecting cellulose. This method keeps feedstock in its native fibrous state, while enhancing the efficiency of enzymatic hydrolysis.

== Enzymes ==
Inbicon has approved three companies' enzymes for their patented cellulosic ethanol production method: Novozymes, Genencor and Royal DSM.

=== Novozymes ===
As of 2012 Novozymes produces Cellic CTec3, which is a cellulase and hemicellulase complex. This is the third generation of this CTec complex. They boost the enzymatic activities with the addition of GH61 compounds. Based on improved β-glucosidases and new hemicellulase activity, the company claims that it is significantly more efficient at conversion in comparison to CTec2. Novozymes also offers Cellic HTec3 that is a hemicellulase complex that has different endo-xylanase and beta-xylosidase activities. In combination with CTec3 can boost conversion efficiency.

=== Genencor ===
DuPont Bioscience, formally Genencor, offers their ACCELLERASE® TRIOTM produced from genetically modified Trichoderma reesei. This complex consists of exoglucanase, endoglucanase, hemi-cellulases and β-glucosidase. The company's enzyme complex can be used for a variety of pretreatments including: alkaline, AFEX, dilute acid, steam explosion and thermal/mechanical. The latter of the processes being the Inbicon's chosen method. For optimum performance the company guidelines state pH in the range of 4-6 and temperatures of 40-57 °C. The amount of enzyme used depends on the biomass feedstock selected but is in the range of 0.03-0.16 mL per gram of biomass.

=== Royal DSM ===
DSM has an enzyme cocktail for the production of cellulosic ethanol. This cocktail contains thermostable cellulases that perform more efficiently at 60 °C than at 50 °C, which reduces costs of cooling during the production. The cocktail also has long storage stability, DSM claims that at a bare minimum of 3 months in room-temperature 14) DSM also claims because it can be produced on-site it reduces transportation costs and increases supply chain reliability. This enzyme cocktail has been tested at the Dong Energy-Inbicon demonstration plant in Kalundborg. They have confirmed and endorsed that DSM enzymes provide the same high yield and shown it is favourable for the industrial production of cellulosic ethanol.

== Fermentation ==
It is believed the preferred fermentation ethanologen is a C6 fermenting microbe as the process recovers C5 molasses at the end of fermentation.

== Pilot plant ==
Inbicon established their first pilot plant in 2003. The company opened their second pilot plant in 2005. Finally, production start-up was unveiled in December 2009 in Kalundborg, Denmark. This plant contains two hydrothermal pretreatment lines of varying quantities. One line has a maximum capacity of 100 kg and the other 1000 kg of lignocellulosic biomass an hour. In the pilot plant only industrial yeast that ferments C6 sugars is used. This plant with the input of 30,000 t of wheat straw can produce 5.4 million litres of ethanol a year. The plant also produces 13,100 t of lignin pellets and 11,250 t of C5-molasses. In their initial pilot plant they were using 2.4 tonnes of feedstock per day. The 2005 scale-up pilot plant achieved a ten-fold increase to 24 tonnes per day. Finally in 2009 in the demonstration plant of Kalundborg they are capable of 100 tonnes per day. Inbicon's future goal is for a plant that could use 1,200 tonnes of feedstock per day.

== Funding ==
Inbicon Biomass Refinery is funded by grants received from Danish EUDP program and Framework Programmes.

Energy Technology Development and Demonstration Programme (EUDP) provides funding for the development of new energy technologies that reduce CO_{2} emissions, are less harmful to the environment and lead to a reduction in fossil fuel consumption. Inbicon received 76.7 million DKK (10.3 mio. EUR) from Danish EUDP for the design and construction of the Biomass Refinery.

Inbicon is also supported by the European Seventh Framework Programme with 67.7 million DKK (9.1 million EUR). Framework Programmes are created by the European Union to promote research in the European Research Area. On May 20, 2010, it was announced that the European Union Commission would partner with four European biofuel projects, one of which was the Kalundborg Cellulosic Ethanol Project at the Inbicon plant. Inbicon has also received a grant from the European Fifth Framework for the development of the biomass refinery.

== Patents ==
=== Non-sterile fermentation of bioethanol ===
Inbicon has patented a method of non-sterile fermentation of ethanol. During the pretreatment and enzymatic hydrolysis of biomass, microbial inhibitors are released which have a significant effect on fermentation. Also, bacterial contamination, especially by lactic acid bacteria, such as lactobacillus, is difficult to prevent in non-sterile conditions. Inbicon has found a range of concentration at which the fermentation inhibitors only inhibit the growth of lactic acid bacteria, but have relatively no effect on fermentative yeast. By determining the optimal levels of fermentation inhibitors, yeast fermentation can be conducted under non-sterile conditions. These optimal levels can be achieved by controlling the water/biomass ratio of the lignocellulose biomass during and after pretreatment.

=== Methods of producing ensiled biomass ===
Before lignocellulose undergoes enzymatic hydrolysis, it must first be pretreated to break down its complex structure and expose cellulose. The pretreatment usually involves heating the lignocellulosic feed stock at high temperature (100–250 °C), which requires much energy and is very costly at the commercial level. Inbicon has patented a method of using ensiled biomass for bioethanol production that does not require expensive heating and chemical pretreatments. The ensiled biomass can be subjected to enzymatic hydrolysis without pretreatment.

=== Methods for reducing enzyme consumption in second-generation bioethanol fermentation in the presence of lignin ===
Enzymatic hydrolysis of lignocellulosic feedstock requires a high concentration of enzyme to overcome low enzymatic hydrolysis. The low enzymatic hydrolysis can be attributed to lignin, which blocks enzyme access to the cellulose. There are several ways of reducing the effects of lignin on enzymatic hydrolysis, one of which is the use of surfactant additives. Inbicon has discovered that at high dry matter content, enzymatic hydrolysis can be conduced in the presence of polyethylene glycerol.
