= Iogen Corporation =

- Type: Private
- Founded: 1970s
- Founder: Patrick Foody Sr.
- Headquarters: Ottawa, Ontario, Canada
- Key people: Brian Foody (CEO); Patrick Foody (Chief Development Officer)
- Products: cellulosic ethanol, advanced biofuels, low CI fuels
- Number of employees: <50
- Website: www.iogen.ca

Iogen Corporation is a Canadian company based in Ottawa, Ontario, Canada, and was founded by Patrick Foody Sr. in 1975.

The company develops technology for making renewable cellulosic biofuels (also known as second generation biofuels, or advanced biofuels) from agricultural residues and other organic wastes.

Iogen has invested $500 million in research, development and demonstration; and has over 300 patents. Using enzymatic hydrolysis technology, Iogen has produced cellulosic ethanol since 2004.

In 2012, Iogen laid off 150 people at its Ottawa headquarters, constituting the majority of its workforce.

In 2014, together with their Brazilian partner Raízen Energia, Iogen built a commercial cellulosic ethanol facility adjacent to Raizen’s Costa Pinto sugar mill in Piracicaba, Brazil.

Iogen is also developing new ways to use biogas as a transportation fuel.

== Costa Pinto Project ==
Brazilian ethanol company Raízen Energia S/A, has completed construction of a commercial biomass-to-ethanol facility using Iogen's advanced cellulosic biofuel technology. The US$105 million plant is located adjacent to Raízen’s Costa Pinto sugar cane mill in Piracicaba, São Paulo, and will produce 40 million litres of cellulosic ethanol a year from sugarcane bagasse and straw.

Subsequent to this first facility, Raízen has said it plans to build another seven facilities using Iogen's cellulosic biofuel technology.

== History ==
2019 - Iogen provides a structured RNG offtake agreement to Three Mile Canyon Farms' anaerobic digester project, located near Boardman Oregon. The project uses the manure from 33,000 dairy cows to feed an anaerobic digester system followed by a biogas clean-up system that injects renewable natural gas (“RNG”) into the natural gas grid.

2015 – Official launch of the Costa Pinto mill, the first commercial facility employing Iogen’s cellulosic ethanol technology.

2014 – Iogen Corporation and Raízen announce they have begun production of cellulosic ethanol on schedule at Raízen`s sugar cane mill in Piracicaba, São Paulo, Brazil.

2014 – Iogen Corporation announces it has developed and patented a new method to make drop-in cellulosic biofuels from biogas using existing refinery assets and production operations.

2013 – Iogen Corporation sells Iogen Bio-Products, its industrial enzymes business, to Danish enzyme manufacturer Novozymes for $80 million.

2013 – Raízen begins construction of a cellulosic ethanol facility using Iogen technology in Brazil. The facility is located adjacent to Raízen's Costa Pinto mill. Raízen says it plans to expand to eight cellulosic ethanol plants using Iogen's technology.

2012 - Iogen Corporation lays off 150 workers at its Ottawa headquarters.

2012 – Iogen Energy (IE) becomes a 50/50 jointly owned venture between Iogen Corp and Raízen Energia S/A, a $12 billion joint venture between Royal Dutch Shell and Brazilian ethanol company Cosan S.A., and enters into a research agreement with Raízen focused on commercialization of Iogen's technology in Brazil.

2012 – Iogen cellulosic ethanol production at its Ottawa, Canada demonstration plant tops 2.1 million litres (561,000 gallons).

2010 – Shell and Cosan S.A., announce their intent to form a Brazilian joint venture, ultimately named Raízen Energia, which would be the country's leading sugar processor, ethanol producer, and fuels retailer. Shell also announces intent to transfer its holdings in Iogen Energy to Raízen.

2009 – Iogen becomes the first cellulosic biofuel producer to sell its advanced biofuel at a retail service station.

2006 – Goldman Sachs invests $30 million in Iogen.

2004 - Iogen producing world’s first cellulose ethanol fuel.

== Technology ==
Iogen’s cellulosic biofuels technology converts a wide variety of cellulosic feedstocks into ethanol and other biofuels. The Iogen process involves:

Feedstock handling: Feedstocks such as agriculture residues are trucked to a cellulosic ethanol facility where the material is weighed and tested for moisture content. Trucks are then sent either to onsite storage, or directly to the unloading area serving the plant process. Once in the process, the feedstock particle size is reduced. When the facility is co-located with a sugarcane mill, bagasse is drawn either directly from the process or from a storage pile. In this case, no further size reduction is required. In both cases, feedstock is processed to remove debris, sand and other impurities.

Pretreatment: Pretreatment is a high temperature, short residence time, mild acid hydrolysis which breaks down the feedstock and prepares it for the introduction of enzymes. Pretreatment also breaks down the hemicellulose component of the feedstock into five-carbon sugars. Pretreatment requires water, chemicals, and high pressure steam. Energy is recovered for re-use elsewhere in the process.

Enzymatic hydrolysis: The enzymatic hydrolysis step is a multi-day operation run under mild conditions. Tanks receive feed slurry from pretreatment, and with the use of added enzymes, the cellulose is then broken down to produce six-carbon sugars.

Lignin separation and processing: In this step, the product of hydrolysis is split into solid and liquid portions. The solid portion consists mainly of lignin which possesses a high heating value, thus making it an ideal fuel for burning in a boiler. The combustion of lignin provides enough energy to power most of the cellulosic ethanol process. The liquid portion, which contains the sugars, is then sent to fermentation.

Ethanol fermentation and distillation: The five- and six-carbon sugars are now converted to ethanol using genetically modified yeasts. A dilute ethanol stream, known as beer, is generated as well as carbon dioxide. The fermentation beer is distilled into commercial-grade fuel ethanol.
