= Cellulosic ethanol =

Ethanol produced from cellulose

Cellulosic ethanol is ethanol (ethyl alcohol) produced from cellulose (the stringy fiber of a plant) rather than from the plant's seeds or fruit. It can be produced from grasses, wood, algae, or other plants. It is generally discussed for use as a biofuel. The carbon dioxide that plants absorb as they grow offsets some of the carbon dioxide emitted when ethanol made from them is burned, so cellulosic ethanol fuel has the potential to have a lower carbon footprint than fossil fuels.

Interest in cellulosic ethanol is driven by its potential to replace ethanol made from corn or sugarcane. Since these plants are also used for food products, diverting them for ethanol production can cause food prices to rise; cellulose-based sources, on the other hand, generally do not compete with food, since the fibrous parts of plants are mostly inedible to humans. Another potential advantage is the high diversity and abundance of cellulose sources; grasses, trees and algae are found in almost every environment on Earth. Even municipal solid waste components like paper could conceivably be made into ethanol. The main current disadvantage of cellulosic ethanol is its high cost of production, which is more complex and requires more steps than corn-based or sugarcane-based ethanol.

Cellulosic ethanol received significant attention in the 2000s and early 2010s. The United States government in particular funded research into its commercialization and set targets for the proportion of cellulosic ethanol added to vehicle fuel. A large number of new companies specializing in cellulosic ethanol, in addition to many existing companies, invested in pilot-scale production plants. However, the much cheaper manufacturing of grain-based ethanol, along with the low price of oil in the 2010s, meant that cellulosic ethanol was not competitive with these established fuels. As a result, most of the new refineries were closed by the mid-2010s and many of the newly founded companies became insolvent. A few still exist, but are mainly used for demonstration or research purposes; as of 2021, none produces cellulosic ethanol at scale.

== Overview ==
Cellulosic ethanol is a type of biofuel produced from lignocellulose, a structural material that comprises much of the mass of plants and is composed mainly of cellulose, hemicellulose and lignin. Popular sources of lignocellulose include both agricultural waste products (e.g. corn stover or wood chips) and grasses like switchgrass and miscanthus species. These raw materials for ethanol production have the advantage of being abundant and diverse and would not compete with food production, unlike the more commonly used corn and cane sugars. However, they also require more processing to make the sugar monomers available to the microorganisms typically used to produce ethanol by fermentation, which drives up the price of cellulose-derived ethanol.

Cellulosic ethanol can reduce greenhouse gas emissions by 85% over reformulated gasoline. By contrast, starch ethanol (e.g., from corn), which most frequently uses natural gas to provide energy for the process, may not reduce greenhouse gas emissions at all depending on how the starch-based feedstock is produced. According to the National Academy of Sciences in 2011, there is no commercially viable bio-refinery in existence to convert lignocellulosic biomass to fuel. Absence of production of cellulosic ethanol in the quantities required by the regulation was the basis of a United States Court of Appeals for the District of Columbia decision announced January 25, 2013, voiding a requirement imposed on car and truck fuel producers in the United States by the Environmental Protection Agency requiring addition of cellulosic biofuels to their products. These issues, along with many other difficult production challenges, led George Washington University policy researchers to state that "in the short term, [cellulosic] ethanol cannot meet the energy security and environmental goals of a gasoline alternative."

== History ==
The French chemist Henri Braconnot was the first to discover that cellulose could be hydrolyzed into sugars by treatment with sulfuric acid in 1819. The hydrolyzed sugar could then be processed to form ethanol through fermentation. The first commercialized ethanol production began in Germany in 1898, where acid was used to hydrolyze cellulose. In the United States, the Standard Alcohol Company opened the first cellulosic ethanol production plant in South Carolina in 1910. Later, a second plant was opened in Louisiana. However, both plants were closed after World War I due to economic reasons.

The first attempt at commercializing a process for ethanol from wood was done in Germany in 1898. It involved the use of dilute acid to hydrolyze the cellulose to glucose, and was able to produce 7.6 liters of ethanol per 100 kg of wood waste (18 US gal (68 L) per ton). The Germans soon developed an industrial process optimized for yields of around 50 US gallons (190 L) per ton of biomass. This process soon found its way to the US, culminating in two commercial plants operating in the southeast during World War I. These plants used what was called "the American Process" — a one-stage dilute sulfuric acid hydrolysis. Though the yields were half that of the original German process (25 US gallons (95 L) of ethanol per ton versus 50), the throughput of the American process was much higher. A drop in lumber production forced the plants to close shortly after the end of World War I. In the meantime, a small but steady amount of research on dilute acid hydrolysis continued at the USFS's Forest Products Laboratory. During World War II, the US again turned to cellulosic ethanol, this time for conversion to butadiene to produce synthetic rubber. The Vulcan Copper and Supply Company was contracted to construct and operate a plant to convert sawdust into ethanol. The plant was based on modifications to the original German Scholler process as developed by the Forest Products Laboratory. This plant achieved an ethanol yield of 50 US gal (190 L) per dry ton, but was still not profitable and was closed after the war.

With the rapid development of enzyme technologies in the last two decades, the acid hydrolysis process has gradually been replaced by enzymatic hydrolysis. Chemical pretreatment of the feedstock is required to hydrolyze (separate) hemicellulose, so it can be more effectively converted into sugars. The dilute acid pretreatment is developed based on the early work on acid hydrolysis of wood at the USFS's Forest Products Laboratory. In 2009, the Forest Products Laboratory together with the University of Wisconsin–Madison developed a sulfite pretreatment to overcome the recalcitrance of lignocellulose for robust enzymatic hydrolysis of wood cellulose.

In his 2007 State of the Union Address on January 23, 2007, US President George W. Bush announced a proposed mandate for 35 billion US gallons (130×10^{9} L) of ethanol by 2017. Later that year, the US Department of Energy awarded $385 million in grants aimed at jump-starting ethanol production from nontraditional sources like wood chips, switchgrass, and citrus peels.

== Production methods ==
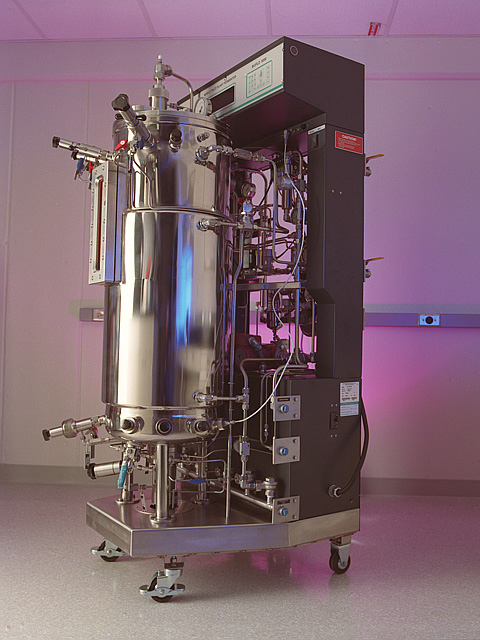
Bioreactor for cellulosic ethanol research.

The stages to produce ethanol using a biological approach are:

1. A "pretreatment" phase to make the lignocellulosic material such as wood or straw amenable to hydrolysis
2. Cellulose hydrolysis (cellulolysis) to break down the molecules into sugars
3. Microbial fermentation of the sugar solution
4. Distillation and dehydration to produce pure alcohol

In 2010, a genetically engineered yeast strain was developed to produce its own cellulose-digesting enzymes. Assuming this technology can be scaled to industrial levels, it would eliminate one or more steps of cellulolysis, reducing both the time required and costs of production.

Although lignocellulose is the most abundant plant material resource, its usability is curtailed by its rigid structure. As a result, an effective pretreatment is needed to liberate the cellulose from the lignin seal and its crystalline structure so as to render it accessible for a subsequent hydrolysis step. By far, most pretreatments are done through physical or chemical means. To achieve higher efficiency, both physical and chemical pretreatments are required. Physical pretreatment involves reducing biomass particle size by mechanical processing methods such as milling or extrusion. Chemical pretreatment partially depolymerizes the lignocellulose so enzymes can access the cellulose for microbial reactions.

Chemical pretreatment techniques include acid hydrolysis, steam explosion, ammonia fiber expansion, organosolv, sulfite pretreatment, SO2-ethanol-water fractionation, alkaline wet oxidation and ozone pretreatment. Besides effective cellulose liberation, an ideal pretreatment has to minimize the formation of degradation products because they can inhibit the subsequent hydrolysis and fermentation steps. The presence of inhibitors further complicates and increases the cost of ethanol production due to required detoxification steps. For instance, even though acid hydrolysis is probably the oldest and most-studied pretreatment technique, it produces several potent inhibitors including furfural and hydroxymethylfurfural. Ammonia Fiber Expansion (AFEX) is an example of a promising pretreatment that produces no inhibitors.

Most pretreatment processes are not effective when applied to feedstocks with high lignin content, such as forest biomass. These require alternative or specialized approaches. Organosolv, SPORL ('sulfite pretreatment to overcome recalcitrance of lignocellulose') and SO2-ethanol-water (AVAP®) processes are the three processes that can achieve over 90% cellulose conversion for forest biomass, especially those of softwood species. SPORL is the most energy efficient (sugar production per unit energy consumption in pretreatment) and robust process for pretreatment of forest biomass with very low production of fermentation inhibitors. Organosolv pulping is particularly effective for hardwoods and offers easy recovery of a hydrophobic lignin product by dilution and precipitation. AVAP® process effectively fractionates all types of lignocellulosics into clean highly digestible cellulose, undegraded hemicellulose sugars, reactive lignin and lignosulfonates, and is characterized by efficient recovery of chemicals.

=== Cellulolytic processes ===
The hydrolysis of cellulose (cellulolysis) produces simple sugars that can be fermented into alcohol. There are two major cellulolysis processes: chemical processes using acids, or enzymatic reactions using cellulases.

==== Chemical hydrolysis ====
In the traditional methods developed in the 19th century and at the beginning of the 20th century, hydrolysis is performed by attacking the cellulose with an acid. Dilute acid may be used under high heat and high pressure, or more concentrated acid can be used at lower temperatures and atmospheric pressure. A decrystallized cellulosic mixture of acid and sugars reacts in the presence of water to complete individual sugar molecules (hydrolysis). The product from this hydrolysis is then neutralized and yeast fermentation is used to produce ethanol. As mentioned, a significant obstacle to the dilute acid process is that the hydrolysis is so harsh that toxic degradation products are produced that can interfere with fermentation. BlueFire Renewables uses concentrated acid because it does not produce nearly as many fermentation inhibitors, but must be separated from the sugar stream for recycle [simulated moving bed chromatographic separation, for example] to be commercially attractive.

Agricultural Research Service scientists found they can access and ferment almost all of the remaining sugars in wheat straw. The sugars are located in the plant's cell walls, which are notoriously difficult to break down. To access these sugars, scientists pretreated the wheat straw with alkaline peroxide, and then used specialized enzymes to break down the cell walls. This method produced 93 US gallons (350 L) of ethanol per ton of wheat straw.

==== Enzymatic hydrolysis ====
Cellulose chains can be broken into glucose molecules by cellulase enzymes. This reaction occurs at body temperature in the stomachs of ruminants such as cattle and sheep, where the enzymes are produced by microbes. This process uses several enzymes at various stages of this conversion. Using a similar enzymatic system, lignocellulosic materials can be enzymatically hydrolyzed at a relatively mild condition (50 °C and pH 5), thus enabling effective cellulose breakdown without the formation of byproducts that would otherwise inhibit enzyme activity. All major pretreatment methods, including dilute acid, require an enzymatic hydrolysis step to achieve high sugar yield for ethanol fermentation.

Fungal enzymes can be used to hydrolyze cellulose. The raw material (often wood or straw) still has to be pre-treated to make it amenable to hydrolysis.

=== Microbial fermentation ===
Traditionally, baker's yeast (Saccharomyces cerevisiae), has long been used in the brewery industry to produce ethanol from hexoses (six-carbon sugars). Due to the complex nature of the carbohydrates present in lignocellulosic biomass, a significant amount of xylose and arabinose (five-carbon sugars derived from the hemicellulose portion of the lignocellulose) is also present in the hydrolysate. For example, in the hydrolysate of corn stover, approximately 30% of the total fermentable sugars is xylose. As a result, the ability of the fermenting microorganisms to use the whole range of sugars available from the hydrolysate is vital to increase the economic competitiveness of cellulosic ethanol and potentially biobased proteins.

At the turn of the millennium, metabolic engineering for microorganisms used in fuel ethanol production showed significant progress. Besides Saccharomyces cerevisiae, microorganisms such as Zymomonas mobilis and Escherichia coli have been targeted through metabolic engineering for cellulosic ethanol production. An attraction towards alternative fermentation organism is its ability to ferment five carbon sugars improving the yield of the feed stock. This ability is often found in bacteria based organisms.

In the first decade of the 21st century, engineered yeasts have been described efficiently fermenting xylose, and arabinose, and even both together. Yeast cells are especially attractive for cellulosic ethanol processes because they have been used in biotechnology for hundreds of years, are tolerant to high ethanol and inhibitor concentrations and can grow at low pH values to reduce bacterial contamination.

=== Combined hydrolysis and fermentation ===
Some species of bacteria have been found capable of direct conversion of a cellulose substrate into ethanol. One example is Clostridium thermocellum, which uses a complex cellulosome to break down cellulose and synthesize ethanol. However, C. thermocellum also produces other products during cellulose metabolism, including acetate and lactate, in addition to ethanol, lowering the efficiency of the process. Some research efforts are directed to optimizing ethanol production by genetically engineering bacteria that focus on the ethanol-producing pathway.

=== Gasification process (thermochemical approach) ===
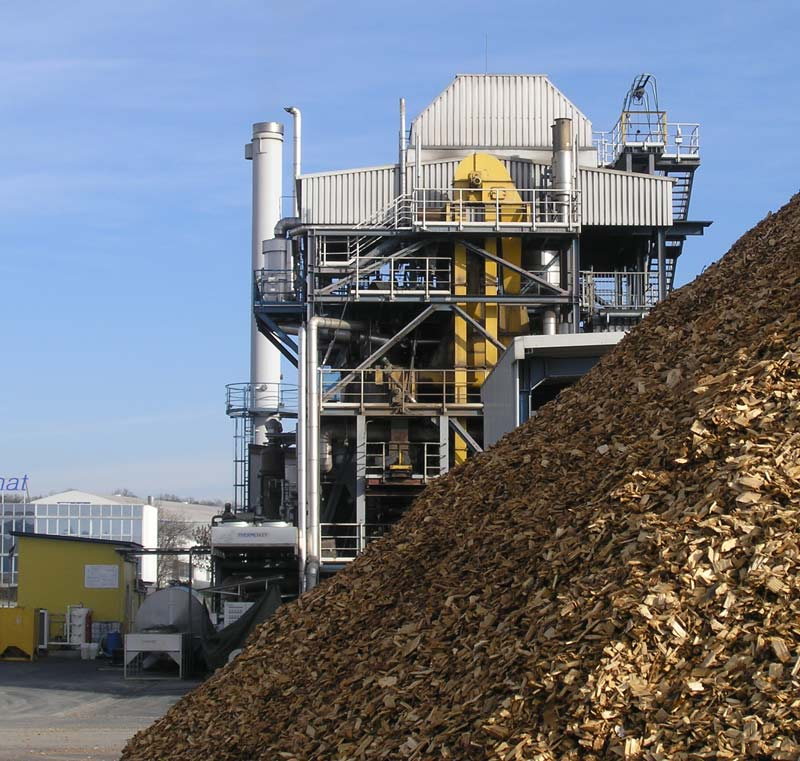
Fluidized Bed Gasifier in Güssing Burgenland Austria

The gasification process does not rely on chemical decomposition of the cellulose chain (cellulolysis). Instead of breaking the cellulose into sugar molecules, the carbon in the raw material is converted into synthesis gas, using what amounts to partial combustion. The carbon monoxide, carbon dioxide and hydrogen may then be fed into a special kind of fermenter. Instead of sugar fermentation with yeast, this process uses Clostridium ljungdahlii bacteria. This microorganism will ingest carbon monoxide, carbon dioxide and hydrogen and produce ethanol and water. The process can thus be broken into three steps:

1. Gasification — Complex carbon-based molecules are broken apart to access the carbon as carbon monoxide, carbon dioxide and hydrogen
2. Fermentation — Convert the carbon monoxide, carbon dioxide and hydrogen into ethanol using the Clostridium ljungdahlii organism
3. Distillation — Ethanol is separated from water

A 2002 study has found another Clostridium bacterium that seems to be twice as efficient in making ethanol from carbon monoxide as the one mentioned above.

Alternatively, the synthesis gas from gasification may be fed to a catalytic reactor where it is used to produce ethanol and other higher alcohols through a thermochemical process. This process can also generate other types of liquid fuels, an alternative concept successfully demonstrated by the Montreal-based company Enerkem at their facility in Westbury, Quebec.

== Hemicellulose to ethanol ==
Studies are intensively conducted to develop economic methods to convert both cellulose and hemicellulose to ethanol. Fermentation of glucose, the main product of cellulose hydrolyzate, to ethanol is an already established and efficient technique. However, conversion of xylose, the pentose sugar of hemicellulose hydrolyzate, is a limiting factor, especially in the presence of glucose. Moreover, it cannot be disregarded as hemicellulose will increase the efficiency and cost-effectiveness of cellulosic ethanol production.

Sakamoto (2012) et al. show the potential of genetic engineering microbes to express hemicellulase enzymes. The researchers created a recombinant Saccharomyces cerevisiae strain that was able to:

1. hydrolyze hemicellulase through codisplaying endoxylanase on its cell surface,
2. assimilate xylose by expression of xylose reductase and xylitol dehydrogenase.

The strain was able to convert rice straw hydrolyzate to ethanol, which contains hemicellulosic components. Moreover, it was able to produce 2.5x more ethanol than the control strain, showing the highly effective process of cell surface-engineering to produce ethanol.

== Advantages ==
=== General advantages of ethanol fuel ===
Ethanol burns more cleanly and more efficiently than gasoline. Because plants consume carbon dioxide as they grow, bioethanol has an overall lower carbon footprint than fossil fuels. Substituting ethanol for oil can also reduce a country's dependence on oil imports.

=== Advantages of cellulosic ethanol over corn or sugar-based ethanol ===
U.S. Environmental Protection Agency Draft life cycle GHG emissions reduction results for different time horizon and discount rate approaches (includes indirect land use change effects)
Fuel Pathway	100 years + 2% discount rate	30 years + 0% discount rate
Corn ethanol (natural gas dry mill)^{(1)}	-16%	+5%
Corn ethanol (Best case NG DM)^{(2)}	-39%	-18%
Corn ethanol (coal dry mill)	+13%	+34%
Corn ethanol (biomass dry mill)	-39%	-18%
Corn ethanol (biomass dry mill with combined heat and power)	-47%	-26%
Brazilian sugarcane ethanol	-44%	-26%
Cellulosic ethanol from switchgrass	-128%	-124%
Cellulosic ethanol from corn stover	-115%	-116%
Notes: (1) Dry mill (DM) plants grind the entire kernel and generally produce only one primary co-product: distillers grains with solubles (DGS). (2) Best case plants produce wet distillers grains co-product.

Commercial production of cellulosic ethanol, which unlike corn and sugarcane would not compete with food production, would be highly attractive since it would alleviate pressure on these foodcrops.

Although its processing costs are higher, the price of cellulose biomass is much cheaper than that of grains or fruits. Moreover, since cellulose is the main component of plants, the whole plant can be harvested, rather than just the fruit or seeds. This results in much better yields; for instance, switchgrass yields twice as much ethanol per acre as corn. Biomass materials for cellulose production require fewer inputs, such as fertilizer, herbicides, and their extensive roots improve soil quality, reduce erosion, and increase nutrient capture. The overall carbon footprint and global warming potential of cellulosic ethanol are considerably lower (see chart) and the net energy output is several times higher than that of corn-based ethanol.

The potential raw material is also plentiful. Around 44% of household waste generated worldwide consists of food and greens. An estimated 323 million tons of cellulose-containing raw materials which could be used to create ethanol are thrown away each year in US alone. This includes 36.8 million dry tons of urban wood wastes, 90.5 million dry tons of primary mill residues, 45 million dry tons of forest residues, and 150.7 million dry tons of corn stover and wheat straw. Moreover, even land marginal for agriculture could be planted with cellulose-producing crops, such as switchgrass, resulting in enough production to substitute for all the current oil imports into the United States.

Paper, cardboard, and packaging comprise around 17% of global household waste; although some of this is recycled. As these products contain cellulose, they are transformable into cellulosic ethanol, which would avoid the production of methane, a potent greenhouse gas, during decomposition.

== Disadvantages ==
=== General disadvantages ===
The main overall drawback of ethanol fuel is its lower fuel economy compared to gasoline when using ethanol in an engine designed for gasoline with a lower compression ratio.

=== Disadvantages of cellulosic ethanol over corn or sugar-based ethanol ===
The main disadvantage of cellulosic ethanol is its high cost and complexity of production, which has been the main impediment to its commercialization.

== Economics ==
Although the global bioethanol market is sizable (around 110 billion liters in 2019), the vast majority is made from corn or sugarcane, not cellulose. In 2007, the cost of producing ethanol from cellulosic sources was estimated ca. USD 2.65 per gallon (€0.58 per liter), which is around 2–3 times more expensive than ethanol made from corn. However, the cellulosic ethanol market remains relatively small and reliant on government subsidies. The US government originally set cellulosic ethanol targets gradually ramping up from 1 billion liters in 2011 to 60 billion liters in 2022. However, these annual goals have almost always been waived after it became clear there was no chance of meeting them. Most of the plants to produce cellulosic ethanol were canceled or abandoned in the early 2010s. Plants built or financed by DuPont, General Motors and BP, among many others, were closed or sold. As of 2018, only one major plant remains in the US.

In order for it to be grown on a large-scale production, cellulose biomass must compete with existing uses of agricultural land, mainly for the production of crop commodities. Of the United States' 2.26 billion acres (9.1 million km^{2}) of unsubmerged land, 33% are forestland, 26% pastureland and grassland, and 20% crop land. A study by the U.S. Departments of Energy and Agriculture in 2005 suggested that 1.3 billion dry tons of biomass is theoretically available for ethanol use while maintaining an acceptable impact on forestry, agriculture.

=== Comparison with corn-based ethanol ===
Currently, cellulose is more difficult and more expensive to process into ethanol than corn or sugarcane. The US Department of Energy estimated in 2007 that it costs about $2.20 per gallon to produce cellulosic ethanol, which is 2–3 times much as ethanol from corn. Enzymes that destroy plant cell wall tissue cost US$0.40 per gallon of ethanol compared to US$0.03 for corn. However, cellulosic biomass is cheaper to produce than corn, because it requires fewer inputs, such as energy, fertilizer, herbicide, and is accompanied by less soil erosion and improved soil fertility. Additionally, nonfermentable and unconverted solids left after making ethanol can be burned to provide the fuel needed to operate the conversion plant and produce electricity. Energy used to run corn-based ethanol plants is derived from coal and natural gas. The Institute for Local Self-Reliance estimates the cost of cellulosic ethanol from the first generation of commercial plants will be in the $1.90–$2.25 per gallon range, excluding incentives. This compares to the current cost of $1.20–$1.50 per gallon for ethanol from corn and the current retail price of over $4.00 per gallon for regular gasoline (which is subsidized and taxed).

=== Enzyme-cost barrier ===
Cellulases and hemicellulases used in the production of cellulosic ethanol are more expensive compared to their first generation counterparts. Enzymes required for maize grain ethanol production cost US$ 2.64-5.28 per cubic meter of ethanol produced. Enzymes for cellulosic ethanol production are projected to cost US$ 79.25/m^{3}US$ EtOH, meaning they are 20-40 times more expensive. The cost differences are attributed to quantity required. The cellulase family of enzymes have a one to two order smaller magnitude of efficiency. Therefore, it requires 40 to 100 times more of the enzyme to be present in its production, about 15-25 kilograms of enzyme per ton of biomass (2009 estimate). Enzymes as a result comprise 20-40% of the costs for cellulosic ethanol production. There are also relatively high capital costs associated with the long incubation times for the vessel that perform enzymatic hydrolysis.

A more recent (2016) estimate reports that 10 kg of enzyme can be used per metric ton of dry biomass feedstock. The enzyme cost fraction depends on how (and where) the cellulase enzyme is produced. For enzyme produced off-site, the fraction is 36%; for production on-site in a separate plant, the fraction is 29%; for integrated enzyme production, the fraction is 13%. One of the key benefits of integrated production is that biomass instead of glucose is the used as the growth medium for enzyme production. Biomass costs less than glucose. It also makes the resulting cellulosic ethanol a 100% second-generation biofuel, i.e., it uses no "food for fuel".

== Feedstocks ==
In general there are two types of feedstocks: forest (woody) Biomass and agricultural biomass. In the US, about 1.4 billion dry tons of biomass can be sustainably produced annually.

=== Forest ===
About 370 million tons or 30% are forest biomass. Forest biomass has higher cellulose and lignin content and lower hemicellulose and ash content than agricultural biomass. Because of the difficulties and low ethanol yield in fermenting pretreatment hydrolysate, especially those with very high 5 carbon hemicellulose sugars such as xylose, forest biomass has significant advantages over agricultural biomass. Forest biomass also has high density which significantly reduces transportation cost. It can be harvested year around which eliminates long-term storage. The close to zero ash content of forest biomass significantly reduces dead load in transportation and processing. To meet the needs for biodiversity, forest biomass will be an important biomass feedstock supply mix in the future biobased economy. However, forest biomass is much more recalcitrant than agricultural biomass. In 2009, the USDA Forest Products Laboratory together with the University of Wisconsin–Madison developed efficient technologies that can overcome the strong recalcitrance of forest (woody) biomass including those of softwood species that have low xylan content. Short-rotation intensive culture or tree farming can offer an almost unlimited opportunity for forest biomass production.

Woodchips from slashes and tree tops and saw dust from saw mills, and waste paper pulp are forest biomass feedstocks for cellulosic ethanol production.

=== Agricultural ===
==== Agricultural waste ====
Food production produces waste in the form of inedible lignocellulosic biomass: stover, sugarcane bagasse, straw, etc. Being lignocellulosic, a majority of their mass is cellulose, hemicellulose, and lignin. Their nature as waste has led to sustained interest in converting them into useful materials including bioethanol.

DuPont's Nevada pilot plant for converting corn stover to bioethanol ended in failure. The German company Verbio purchased the plant with a goal to convert it to biomethane production.

==== Switchgrass ====
Switchgrass (Panicum virgatum) is a native tallgrass prairie grass. Known for its hardiness and rapid growth, this perennial grows during the warm months to heights of 2–6 feet. Switchgrass can be grown in most parts of the United States, including swamplands, plains, streams, and along the shores & interstate highways. It is self-seeding (no tractor for sowing, only for mowing), resistant to many diseases and pests, & can produce high yields with low applications of fertilizer and other chemicals. It is also tolerant to poor soils, flooding, & drought; improves soil quality and prevents erosion due its type of root system.

Switchgrass is an approved cover crop for land protected under the federal Conservation Reserve Program (CRP). CRP is a government program that pays producers a fee for not growing crops on land on which crops recently grew. This program reduces soil erosion, enhances water quality, and increases wildlife habitat. CRP land serves as a habitat for upland game, such as pheasants and ducks, and a number of insects. Switchgrass for biofuel production has been considered for use on Conservation Reserve Program (CRP) land, which could increase ecological sustainability and lower the cost of the CRP program. However, CRP rules would have to be modified to allow this economic use of the CRP land.

==== Giant miscanthus ====
Miscanthus × giganteus is another viable feedstock for cellulosic ethanol production. This species of grass is native to Asia and is a sterile hybrid of Miscanthus sinensis and Miscanthus sacchariflorus. It has high crop yields, is cheap to grow, and thrives in a variety of climates. However, because it is sterile, it also requires vegetative propagation, making it more expensive.

== Cellulosic ethanol commercialization ==
Fueled by subsidies and grants, a boom in cellulosic ethanol research and pilot plants occurred in the early 2000s. Companies such as Iogen, POET, and Abengoa built refineries that could process biomass and turn it into ethanol, while companies such as DuPont, Diversa and Novozymes invested in enzyme research. These projects and pilot plants were canceled or closed in the early 2010s as technical and economic obstacles proved too difficult to overcome.

In the later 2010s, various companies occasionally attempted smaller-scale efforts at commercializing cellulosic ethanol, although such ventures generally remain at experimental scales and often dependent on subsidies. The companies Granbio, Raízen and the Centro de Tecnologia Canavieira each run a pilot-scale facility operate in Brazil, which together produce around 30 million liters in 2019. Iogen, which started as an enzyme maker in 1991 and re-oriented itself to focus primarily on cellulosic ethanol in 2013, owns many patents for cellulosic ethanol production and provided the technology for the Raízen plant. Other companies developing cellulosic ethanol technology as of 2021 are Inbicon (Denmark); companies operating or planning pilot production plants include New Energy Blue (US), Sekab (Sweden) and Clariant (in Romania). Abengoa, a Spanish company with cellulosic ethanol assets, became insolvent in 2021. Clariant exited the field in 2023.

The Australian Renewable Energy Agency, along with state and local governments, partially funded a pilot plant in 2017 and 2020 in New South Wales as part of efforts to diversify the regional economy away from coal mining.

=== US Government support ===
From 2006, the US Federal government began promoting the development of ethanol from cellulosic feedstocks. In May 2008, Congress passed a new farm bill that contained funding for the commercialization of second-generation biofuels, including cellulosic ethanol. The Food, Conservation, and Energy Act of 2008 provided for grants covering up to 30% of the cost of developing and building demonstration-scale biorefineries for producing "advanced biofuels," which effectively included all fuels not produced from corn kernel starch. It also allowed for loan guarantees of up to $250 million for building commercial-scale biorefineries.

In January 2011, the USDA approved $405 million in loan guarantees through the 2008 Farm Bill to support the commercialization of cellulosic ethanol at three facilities owned by Coskata, Enerkem and INEOS. The projects represent a combined 73 million US gallons (280,000 m^{3}) per year production capacity and will begin producing cellulosic ethanol in 2012. The USDA also released a list of advanced biofuel producers who will receive payments to expand the production of advanced biofuels. In July 2011, the US Department of Energy gave in $105 million in loan guarantees to POET for a commercial-scale plant to be built Emmetsburg, Iowa.

== See also ==
- Second generation biofuels
- Food vs. fuel
