= Aspergillus heteromorphus =

Scientific classification
- Domain: Eukaryota
- Kingdom: Fungi
- Division: Ascomycota
- Class: Eurotiomycetes
- Order: Eurotiales
- Family: Aspergillaceae
- Genus: Aspergillus
- Species: A. heteromorphus

Binomial name
- Aspergillus heteromorphus Batista and H. Maia (1957)

Species of fungus

Aspergillus heteromorphus is a species of fungus in the genus Aspergillus. A. heteromorphus belongs to the group of black Aspergilli which are important industrial workhorses. A. heteromorphus belongs to the Nigri section. The species was first described in 1957. The species has been found in Brazil. It has been isolated from both rice straws, wheat straws, and sugarcane bagasse. This species can produce sclerotia and some mid-polar indole compounds. It produces a series of other not well-characterized exometabolites.

The genome of A. heteromorphus was sequenced and published in 2014 as part of the Aspergillus whole-genome sequencing project – a project dedicated to performing whole-genome sequencing of all members of the genus Aspergillus. The genome assembly size was 35.61 Mbp.

== Growth and morphology ==
Aspergillus heteromorphus has been cultivated on both Czapek yeast extract agar (CYA) plates and Malt Extract Agar Oxoid® (MEAOX) plates. The growth morphology of the colonies can be seen in the pictures below.

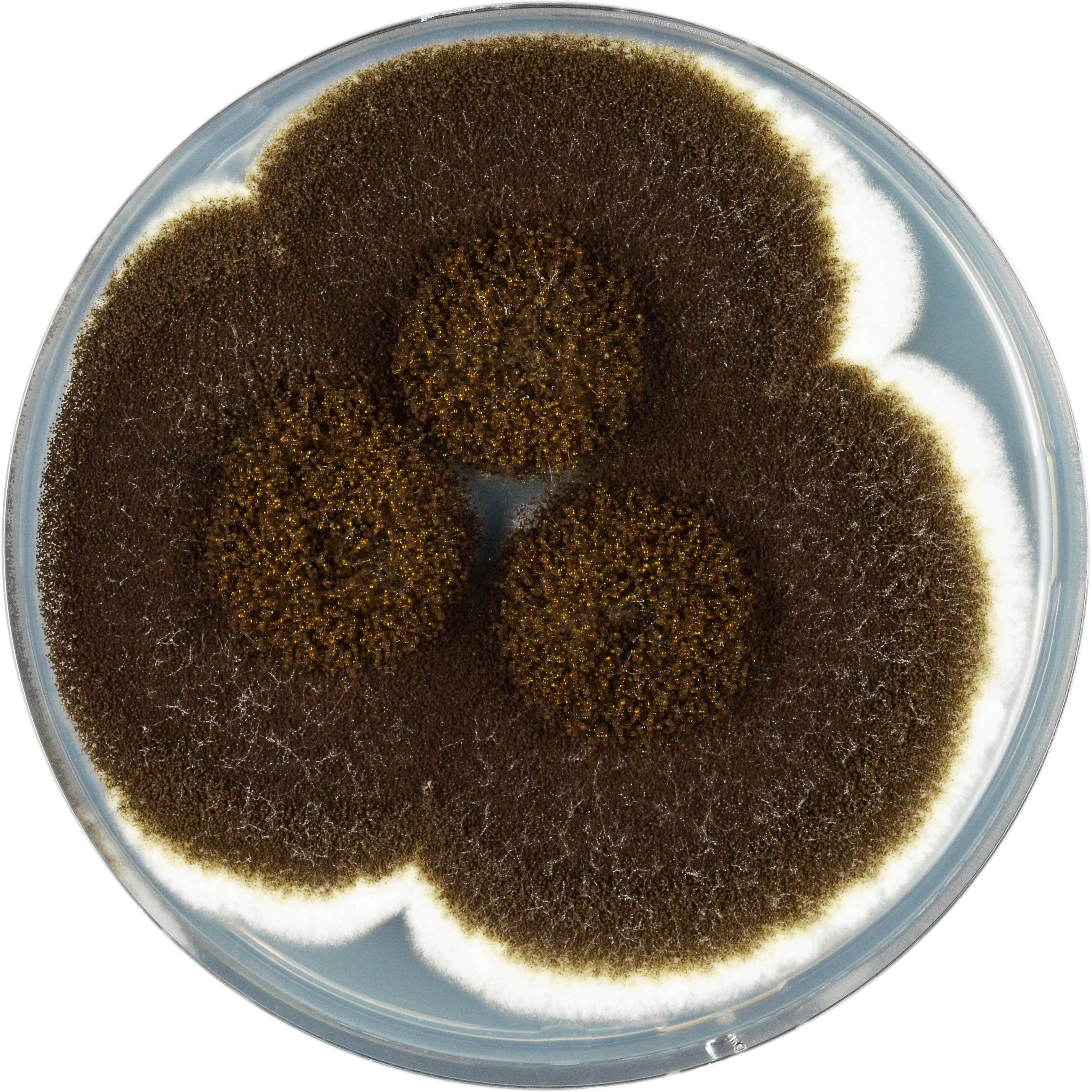
Aspergillus heteromorphus growing on CYA plate

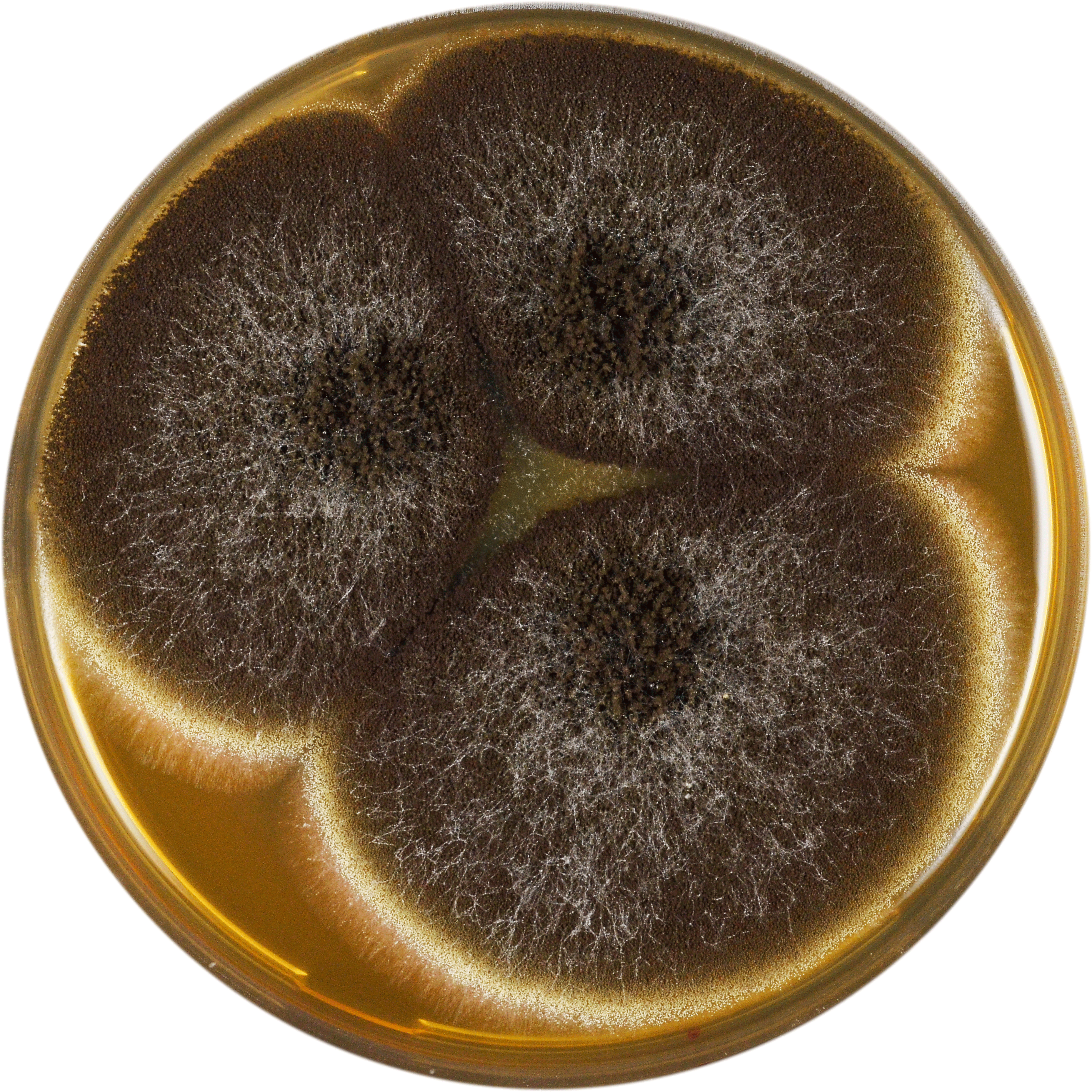
Aspergillus heteromorphus growing on MEAOX plate
