= Ljungdahl =

Ljungdahl is a Swedish surname. Notable people with the surname include:

- Axel Ljungdahl (1897–1995), a Swedish Air Force general
- Carina Ljungdahl (born 1960), Swedish swimmer
- Else-Marie Ljungdahl (born 1942), Swedish sprint canoeist
- Lars Ljungdahl (1926–2023), a Swedish biochemist
