= Stover =

Leaves and stalks of field crops

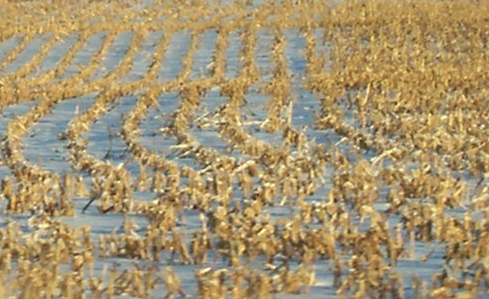
Stover with some snow cover

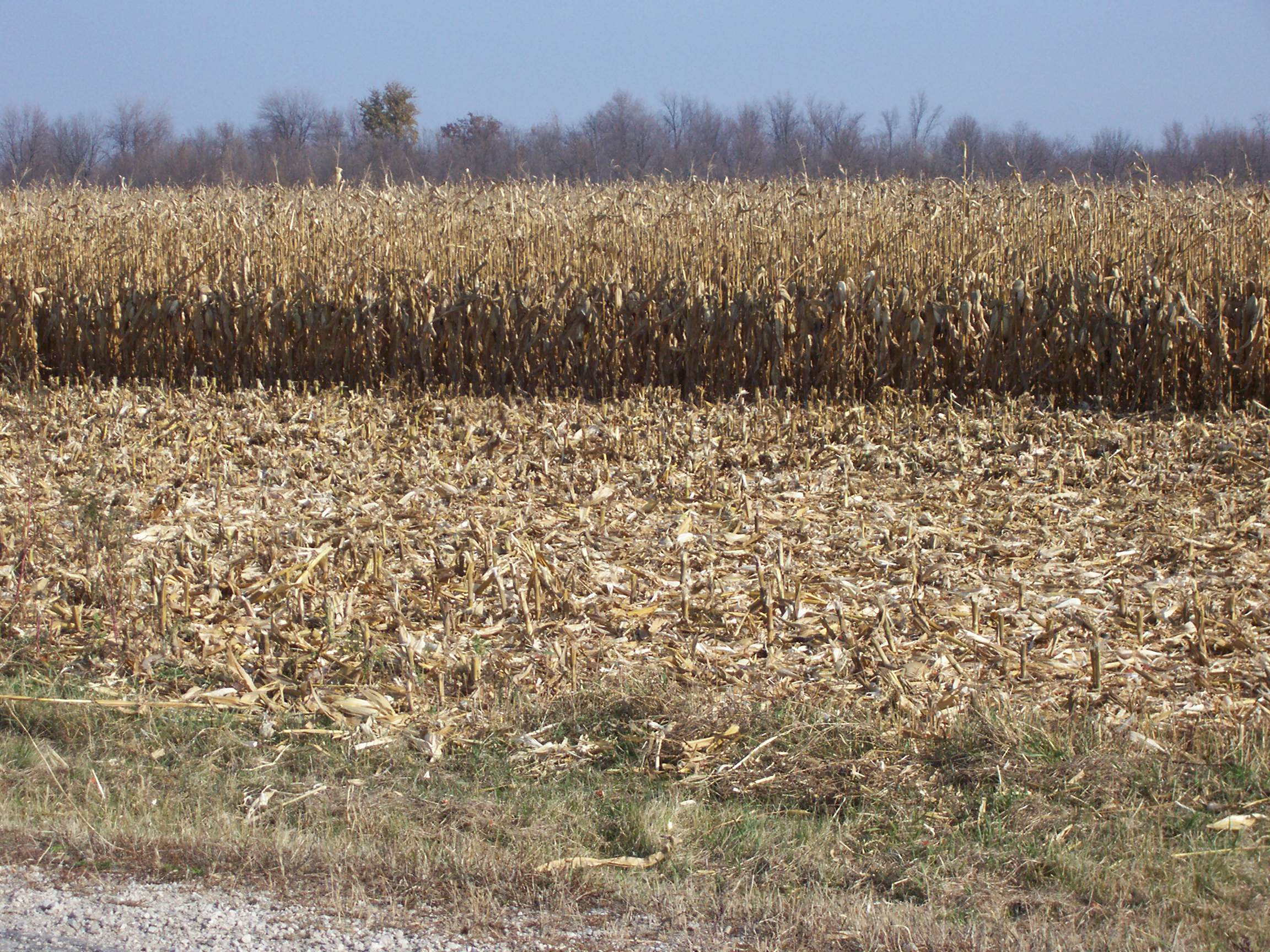
Stover (foreground), unharvested corn (background)

Stover are the leaves and stalks of field crops, such as corn (maize), sorghum or soybean that are commonly left in a field after harvesting the grain. It is similar to straw, the residue left after any cereal grain or grass has been harvested at maturity for its seed. It can be directly grazed by cattle or dried for use as fodder. Stover has attracted some attention as a potential fuel source, and as biomass for fermentation or as a feedstock for cellulosic ethanol production. Stover from various crops can also be used in mushroom compost preparation.

The word stover derives from the English legal term estovers, referring to the right of tenants to cut timber.

== See also ==
- Corn stover
- Crop residue
