= Enerkem =

Canadian biofuel company

- Founded: 2000
- Headquarters: Montreal, Quebec, Canada
- Key people: Dominique Boies (CEO and CFO)
- Production output: Biofuels and circular chemicals
- Website: enerkem.com

Enerkem is a clean technology company based in Montreal. Founded in 2000, Enerkem uses its patented technology to convert residual biomass and non-recyclable municipal solid waste (MSW) into biofuels and renewable chemicals.

In Quebec, Canada, Enerkem has an innovation centre in Westbury. The company's first commercial-scale demonstration plant was inaugurated in Edmonton in 2014. Other commercial plants are under development in Canada and Europe, such as in Tarragona (Spain), Rotterdam (Netherlands) and Varennes (Quebec), with the latter under construction in September 2021.

Enerkem is a private company. Its shareholders are National Bank of Canada, BlackRock, Braemar Energy Ventures, Cycle Capital, Fonds de solidarité FTQ, Fondaction CSN, Investissement Québec, Rho Ventures, Sinobioway, Suncor, The Westly Group and Waste Management.

Enerkem is positioned in the field of biofuels and greenhouse gas reduction. The management team consists of ten managers and is chaired by Dominique Boies, CEO and CFO since 2019. The Board of Directors comprises nine experienced directors and is chaired by Joshua Ruch, President of Rho Capital Partners.

== History ==
Enerkem's technology was developed by Dr. Esteban Chornet (Lehigh University and professor emeritus at the University of Sherbrooke). Professor Chornet has been in Quebec since 1970 and has had a distinguished career as a professor at the University of Sherbrooke while continuing his work on biomass. He has also conducted highly successful research projects in catalysis and thermochemistry with Canadian and American partners.

Over the years, Esteban Chornet's research has allowed him to explore the potential of biomass as an alternative energy source. This led to the revolutionary technology that allows Enerkem to produce biofuels and renewable chemicals from biomass and non-recyclable waste.

In 2000, in order to take full advantage of this technology, Esteban Chornet founded Enerkem with his son Vincent Chornet. The new company focused on refining its technology and seeking financing.

In 2004, Enerkem completed the construction of a pilot plant in Sherbrooke, Quebec, Canada, to further develop its technology and adapt it to market requirements.

In 2009, the company commissioned an industrial demonstration plant in Westbury, in the Eastern Townships, Quebec. This plant will work on the production of ethanol and methanol from forestry waste and biomass. It will also have a mandate to develop new products and act as a training centre.

In 2014, Enerkem inaugurated its first full-scale facility in Edmonton, Alberta, Canada, for the conversion of household waste into biofuels and renewable chemicals. In 2016, it became the first ISCC-certified plant in the world to convert waste materials into biomethanol.

In 2018, Enerkem joined a partnership consisting of AkzoNobel, Van Gansewinkel, Air Liquide, AVR and Enerkem to build a waste treatment plant in Rotterdam in collaboration with the Port of Rotterdam, the City of Rotterdam, the province of South Holland and Innovation Quarter.

On July 12, 2019, Dominique Boies was appointed chief executive officer and Chief Financial Officer to replace Vincent Chornet, who died prematurely a few weeks earlier. Mr. Boies had served as the company's CFO since 2017.

On December 8, 2020, Enerkem announced the construction of an $875 million biofuel plant in Varennes, Quebec.

In April 2021, Spain's Repsol announced that it had partnered with Enerkem and Agbar (Suez) to build a waste-to-renewable chemicals plant in Tarragona, Spain.

In June 2021, to meet growing demand from airlines, Shell, Enerkem, and the Port of Rotterdam announced a shift in focus for the Rotterdam (Netherlands) projected plant to the production of sustainable aviation fuel.

== Current and projected plants using Enerkem technology ==
=== Demonstration plant ===
- Westbury, Quebec: Operating since 2008, the Westbury plant is used for demonstration purposes, new product development and as a training centre for technicians and plant operators. In 2018, it successfully produced a high-performance biofuel that could improve the octane rating of fuels sold on the market and reduce their carbon footprint. In the same year, the research and development team produced a clean and renewable bio-dimethyl ether (bio-DME), derived from biomethanol, which could effectively contribute to the fight against climate change by replacing diesel fuel used in the transportation sector.

=== Plant under construction ===
- Varennes, Quebec: Construction of the Varennes Carbon Recycling (VCR) plant is ongoing. The project is being carried out with a group of strategic partners including Enerkem as well as Shell, Suncor, Proman and Investissement Québec. The biorefinery will benefit from a significant input of green hydrogen. The plant is expected to be operational in 2025. Annually, it will be able to produce 125,000 tonnes of biofuels from 200,000 tonnes of biomass and non-recyclable residual materials from the industrial, commercial and institutional sectors.

=== Planned plants ===
- El Morrell, Tarragona, Spain: In April 2021, the Spanish company Repsol announced that it had partnered with Enerkem and Agbar (Suez) to build a waste-to-renewable-chemicals plant in El Morrell, Spain. The plant is planned to become operational in 2025 and will produce some 220,000 metric tons of methanol from approximately 400,000 metric tons of non-recyclable municipal solid waste. Final investment decision is pending.
- Rotterdam, The Netherlands: In 2018, Enerkem joined a partnership of several large European companies to build a waste treatment plant in Rotterdam. In June 2021, to meet growing demand from airlines, Shell, Enerkem, and the Port of Rotterdam announced a shift in the focus of the Rotterdam plant to the production of sustainable aviation fuel.

=== Decommissioned plant ===
- Edmonton Alberta Biofuels: This commercial size demonstration facility was operation 2016-2024 and was the first collaboration on such a scale between a major city and a producer of biofuels from waste. It was designed with a capacity of 350 metric tonnes of waste material per day to produce some 38 million litres of ethanol per year. In 2017, a methanol-to-ethanol conversion unit was installed at the plant, which enabled the production of biomethanol. Enerkem thus became the first company to produce cellulosic ethanol from non-recyclable and non-compostable municipal solid waste. The facility was retired in February 2024 after having achieved 15.000 hours of operation and produced 5.000 Nm^{3} ethanol/methanol.
