= Lignocellulosic biomass =

Plant dry matter

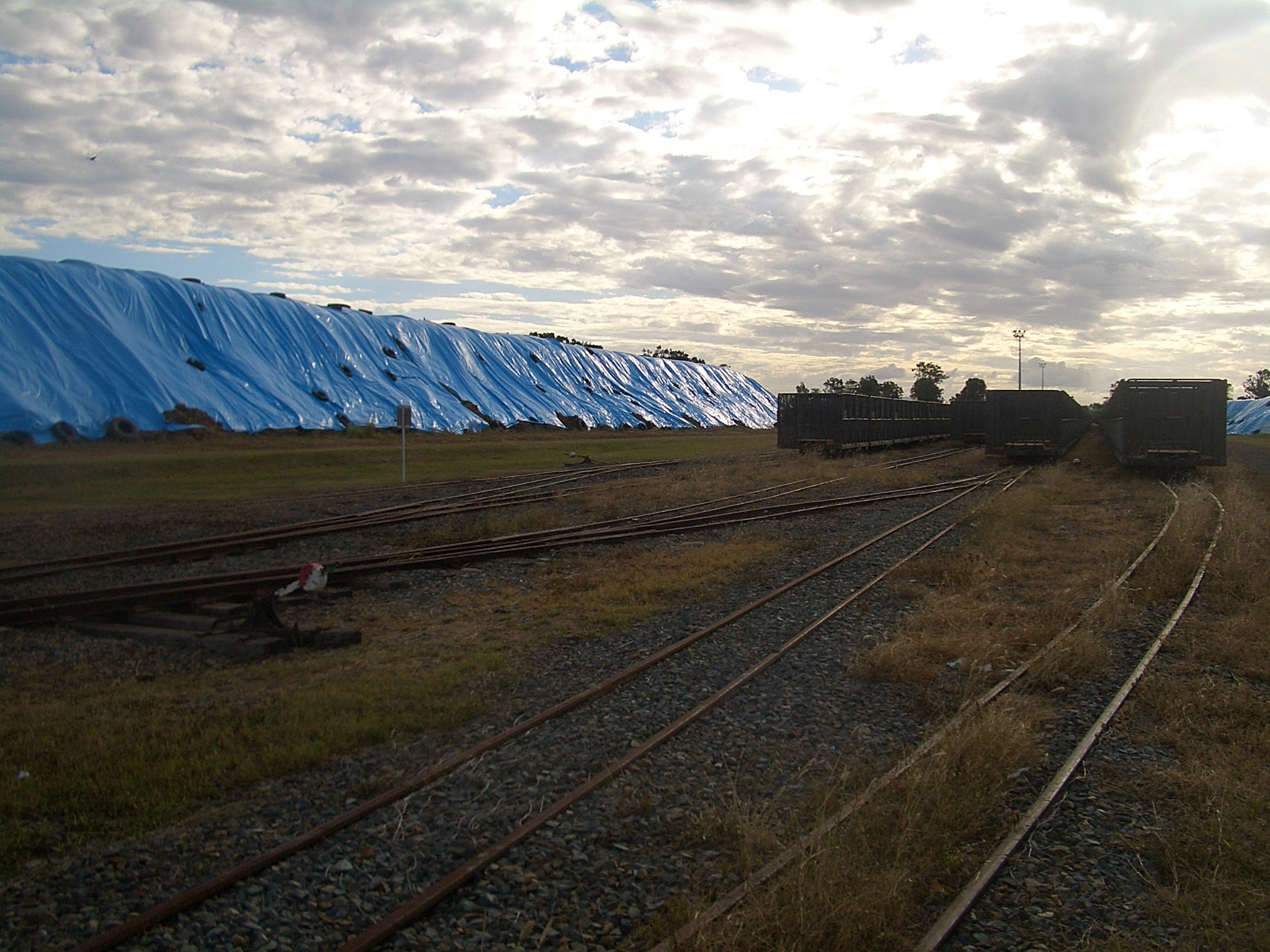
Bagasse, the lignin-rich component of sugarcane, is a form of lignocellulosic biomass. Its combustion helps to power the sugar mill. In this photograph, the bagasse is under the blue plastic. Location: Proserpine, Queensland.

Lignocellulose refers to plant dry matter (biomass), so called lignocellulosic biomass. It is the most abundantly available raw material on the Earth for the production of biofuels. It is composed of two kinds of carbohydrate polymers, cellulose and hemicellulose, and an aromatic-rich polymer called lignin. Any biomass rich in cellulose, hemicelluloses, and lignin is commonly referred to as lignocellulosic biomass. Each component has a distinct chemical behavior. Being a composite of three very different components makes the processing of lignocellulose challenging. The evolved resistance to degradation or even separation is referred to as recalcitrance. Overcoming this recalcitrance to produce useful, high value products requires a combination of heat, chemicals, enzymes, and microorganisms. These carbohydrate-containing polymers contain different sugar monomers (six and five carbon sugars) and they are covalently bound to lignin.

Lignocellulosic biomass can be broadly classified as virgin biomass, waste biomass, and energy crops. Virgin biomass includes plants. Waste biomass is produced as a low value byproduct of various industrial sectors such as agriculture (corn stover, sugarcane bagasse, straw etc.) and forestry (saw mill and paper mill discards). Energy crops are crops with a high yield of lignocellulosic biomass produced as a raw material for the production of second-generation biofuel; examples include switchgrass (Panicum virgatum) and elephant grass. The biofuels generated from these energy crops are sources of sustainable energy.

== Chemical composition ==
Xylan is one form of hemicellulose found in hardwood.

Lignocellulose consists of three components, each with properties that pose challenges to commercial applications.

- lignin is a heterogeneous, highly crosslinked polymer akin to phenol-formaldehyde resins. It is derived from 3-4 monomers, the ratio of which varies from species to species. The crosslinking is extensive. Being rich in aromatics, lignin is hydrophobic and relatively rigid. Lignin confers structural integrity to plants. Lignin is so heterogeneous and so recalcitrant that its value is almost exclusively measured as a fuel.
- hemicellulose is composed of branched polysaccharides. A particular problem is that hemicellulose is covalently linked to lignin, usually through ferulic acid component of the lignin. This makes it difficult to extract the sugars necessary for conversion to biofuels. Next to cellulose hemicellulose is the second most abundant source of carbohydrates in a plant.
- cellulose is a homopolymer of glucose. It is very poorly soluble in most solvents, so glucose is extracted through chemical and biological breakdown achieved by cellulolytic enzymes. This extraction is made easier by the fact that the strands of cellulose are integrated into, but not covalently attached to the lignin-hemicellulose component.

== Dedicated energy crops ==
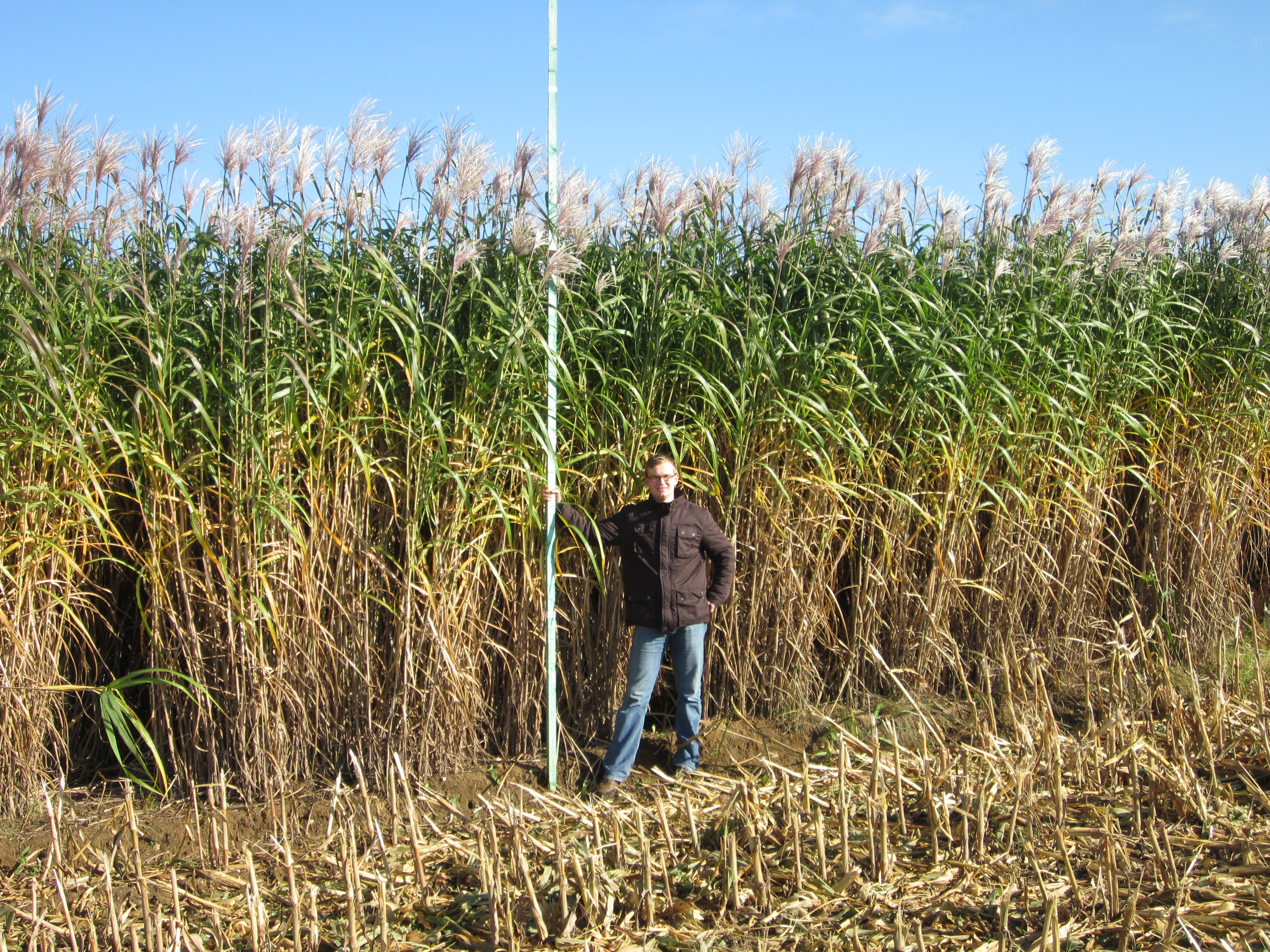
Miscanthus is a so-called energy crop, being highly efficient (fast-growing) at turning solar radiation into biomass

Many crops are of interest for their ability to provide high yields of biomass. Some can be harvested multiple times each year. These include poplar trees and Miscanthus giganteus. The premier energy crop is sugarcane, which is a source of the readily fermentable sucrose and the lignocellulosic by-product bagasse.

== Application ==
=== Pulp and paper industry ===
Lignocellulosic biomass is the feedstock for the pulp and paper industry. In this process lignin and hemicellulose are typically separated from the plant material leaving the fibrous cellulose component to be processed for paper production, or 'chemical cellulose'. Through the pulp process most of the lignin is removed and discharged as waste material in the form of effluent/wastewater before then being used as low-value fuel to generate electricity and heat. Some lignin from paper waste is alternatively used as lignosulfonates and sulfonated lignins.

=== Sugar ===
In principle, the world's current sugar demand could be fulfilled by repurposing pulp and paper mills for lignocellulosic sugar production, making it a promising resilient food.

=== Biofuels ===
==== Direct combustion ====
Lignocellulosic biomass, in the form of wood fuel, has a long history as a source of energy. Straw and other forms of lignocellulostic biomass has more recently been used for electricity generation in the form of uncompressed (bale) and compressed (pellet) fuels. Pelleting allows the fuel to be economically transported over further distances. First generation pellets are limited to a co-firing rate of 15% in modern IGCC plants.

Pretreatment before pelletization changes the physical and chemical properties of biomass fuel. Torrefaction (a mild pyrolysis) increases the energy density of straw and makes it hydrophobic. The resulting pellets have fuel properties similar to coal.

==== Conversion ====
Since the middle of the 20th century, the interest of biomass as a precursor to liquid fuels has increased. To be specific, the fermentation of lignocellulosic biomass to ethanol is an attractive route to fuels that supplements the fossil fuels. Biomass can be a carbon neutral source of energy in the long run. However depending on the source of biomass, it will not be carbon neutral in the short term. For instance if the biomass is derived from trees, the time period to regrow the tree (on the order of decades) will see a net increase in carbon dioxide in the Earth's atmosphere upon the combustion of lignocellulosic ethanol. However, if woody material from annual crop residue is used, the fuel could be considered carbon-neutral. Aside from ethanol, many other lignocellulose-derived fuels are of potential interest, including butanol, dimethylfuran, and gamma-valerolactone.

===== Ethanol =====
One barrier to the production of ethanol from biomass is that the sugars necessary for fermentation are trapped inside the lignocellulose. Lignocellulose has evolved to resist degradation and to confer hydrolytic stability and structural robustness to the cell walls of the plants. This robustness or "recalcitrance" is attributable to the crosslinking between the polysaccharides (cellulose and hemicellulose) and the lignin via ester and ether linkages. Ester linkages arise between oxidized sugars, the uronic acids, and the phenols and phenylpropanols functionalities of the lignin. To extract the fermentable sugars, one must first disconnect the celluloses from the lignin, and then use acid or enzymatic methods to hydrolyze the newly freed celluloses to break them down into simple monosaccharides. Another challenge to biomass fermentation is the high percentage of pentoses in the hemicellulose, such as xylose, or wood sugar. Unlike hexoses such as glucose, pentoses are difficult to ferment. The problems presented by the lignin and hemicellulose fractions are the foci of much contemporary research.

A large sector of research into the exploitation of lignocellulosic biomass as a feedstock for bio-ethanol focuses particularly on the fungus Trichoderma reesei, known for its cellulolytic abilities. Multiple avenues are being explored including the design of an optimised cocktail of cellulases and hemicellulases isolated from T. reesei, as well as genetic-engineering-based strain improvement to allow the fungus to simply be placed in the presence of lignocellulosic biomass and break down the matter into D-glucose monomers. Strain improvement methods have led to strains capable of producing significantly more cellulases than the original QM6a isolate; certain industrial strains are known to produce up to 100g of cellulase per litre of fungus, thus allowing for maximal extraction of sugars from lignocellulosic biomass. These sugars can then be fermented, leading to bio-ethanol.

===== Methane =====
Producing methane from lignocellulosic biomass can be achieved by anaerobic digestion, a purely biological process. Pretreatment can be used to remove some crosslinks, making the biomass easier for microbes to digest. A combination (consortium) of microbes can then overcome the remaining barriers and make good use of the material.

== Research ==
Some chemicals could be obtained from lignocellulosic biomass. Almost all are derived from the sugars obtained by hydrolysis of the cellulose component.

Lignocellulosic biomasses has been considered in the production of biocomposites materials such as particle panels, wood-plastic composites, and cement/geopolymer wood composites. Even though the production of biocomposite materials rely mostly on wood resources, in less forest-covered countries or in countries where wood resources are already being overused, it is possible to utilize alternative sources of biomass such as invasive plants, agricultural and sawmills residues for the creation of new "green" composites. Biocomposites produced with lignocellulosic biomass as an alternative to conventional materials, are attracting attention because they are renewable and cheaper but also because they fit perfectly into the policy of the "cascade utilization" of the resources.
