= Lars Ljungdahl =

Swedish biochemist

Lars Gerhard Ljungdahl (1926-2023) was a Swedish biochemist, famous for his part in the discovery of the major carbon fixation in the form of the Wood-Ljungdahl pathway as well as lignocellulose degradation by bacteria and fungi. He died in July 2023 at age 96.

== Education ==
He graduated from Stockholm Stads Tekniska Mellanskola (The City of Stockholm's Technical Secondary School) in 1943. While taking night classes, he received a degree in engineering from Stockholm's Technical Institute (STI) in 1945. In 1958, at age 32, Ljungdahl left Sweden to gain his Master's and then his PhD under Harland Wood at Case Western Reserve University, receiving his PhD in 1964.

== Research ==
Dr. Ljungdahl focused on anaerobic microorganisms and their interactions with the environment. This led to what can be considered the two main discoveries of his career: the acetyl-CoA pathway, now known as the Wood-Ljungdahl pathway, and the degradation of plant lignocellulose by bacteria and fungi.

In continuation of his work under Harland Wood, and in collaboration with Wood's lab, Ljungdahl and his students at UGA, discovered an autotrophic CO_{2} fixation pathway where acetate in synthesized within Moorella thermoacetica. This pathway would go on to be named the Wood-Ljungdahl pathway.

In the middle of it all, he also discovered that tungsten is a biologically active metal.

In continuation of research that Ljungdahl began at the Stockholm Brewing Company looking at the enzymatic hydrolysis of cellulose for the production of fermented sugars. This led to the discovery of cellulosomes complexes that can digest plant lignocellulose in anaerobic fungi and bacteria within the rumen of herbivorous mammals. This cellulose degration process has many future biotechnological potentials as feedstock chemicals and biofuels.

== Career ==
After graduating secondary school, he began as a technician at Karolinska Institute until 1946, when he served in the Swedish army for a year. He then worked as a chemist at Stockholm Brewing Company until 1958. While working towards his graduate degrees, Ljungdahl worked as a lab technician at CWRU. After finishing his PhD, Ljungdahl became an assistant professor at CWRU in 1964. From there, Lars Ljungdahl joined the University of Georgia's Department of Biochemistry as an assistant professor in 1967 and taught there until he retired in 2006 as Georgia Power Distinguished Professor in Biotechnology. He was an editor for the American Society of Microbiology journal Applied and Environmental Microbiology for ten years.

== Family ==
In 1949, while still in Sweden, Ljungdahl married Britt-Marie Swahn and were married until she died in 1995. She was survived by their two children, Ann-Sofie (born in 1953) and Per (born in 1957). Per is now a professor of molecular biosciences at Stockholm University in Sweden, studying amino acid metabolism. In 1998, he married his second wife Despy Karlas and they were married until she passed in 2010.

Rune Stjernholm was Dr. Ljungdahl's cousin and was also an accomplished biochemist. Stjernholm served as the chairman and Head of the Department of Biochemistry at Tulane University.

== Awards and honors ==
Ljungdahl was elected to the Swedish Royal Academy of Engineering Sciences in 1987. During his tenure at UGA, he was named the Georgia Power Distinguished Professor in Biotechnology and held the title until he retired.

Due to his work on the acetyl-CoA pathway, a bacterium at the center of the pathway was named in his honor: Clostridium ljungdahlii.
