= POET =

American biofuel manufacturer

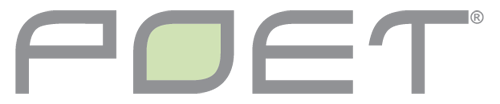
- Type: Private
- Industry: bioethanol
- Founded: 1986; 40 years ago
- Headquarters: Sioux Falls, South Dakota
- Key people: Jeff Broin, Chairman & CEO Jeff Lautt, President & COO
- Revenue: ▲$6.5 billion (2017)
- Number of employees: 2,000
- Website: poet.com

POET LLC is a U.S. biofuel company that specializes in the creation of bioethanol. The privately held corporation, which was originally called Broin Companies, is headquartered in Sioux Falls, South Dakota. In 2007, the Renewable Fuels Association named POET the largest U.S. ethanol producer, creating 1.1 billion US gallons (4,200,000 m^{3}) of fuel per year. POET currently produces 3 billion gallons of ethanol per year, or 19% of all ethanol produced in the United States.

POET operates 34 ethanol plants spread across Indiana, Iowa, Michigan, Missouri, Ohio, Minnesota, and South Dakota. Among its coproducts in the process are feed ingredients such as distillers grains, syrup and corn oil, along with additional coproducts including an asphalt rejuvenator, liquified CO_{2} and dry ice.

== History ==
The company traces its history to a family farm owned by Lowell Broin in Wanamingo, Minnesota, which farmed corn and livestock on 1,200 acres. In 1985, Lowell and his sons built their first ethanol plant. In 1986, it became commercial launching its flagship plant in Scotland, South Dakota in foreclosed ethanol plant under the corporate name Broin Farms which became Broin Companies.

In 2007, it was renamed POET. Then company president Jeff Broin said the new name is not an acronym. He said, “We wanted a name that would represent, rather than describe, who we are and what we do...As a poet takes everyday words and turns them into something valuable and beautiful; we use creativity that comes from common sense to leave things better than we found them.”

The reorganization changes the following company names:

- Broin Companies –> Poet
- Broin Management –> Poet Plant Management
- Broin & Associates –> Poet Design & Construction
- Ethanol Products –> Poet Ethanol Products
- Dakota Gold Marketing –> Poet Nutrition
- Broin Enterprises –> Poet Research Center

Its plants have been visited by President George W. Bush in Wentworth, South Dakota in April 2002, by President Barack Obama in Macon, Missouri in April 2010, and by President Joe Biden in Menlo, Iowa, in April 2022.

In May 2026, POET and Antora Energy announced the commissioning of a 5-gigawatt-hour thermal energy storage system at POET's Big Stone City bioprocessing facility in South Dakota, designed to store surplus wind power as heat for later use.

== Cellulosic ethanol ==
POET has constructed an $8 million pilot plant to produce cellulosic ethanol made from corn cobs and other crop residue.

A commercial scale project, based on the pilot plant, was undertaken as a joint venture with Royal DSM under the name POET-DSM Advanced Biofuels, LLC. A federal loan guarantee was obtained in July 2011 for a commercial-scale plant to be built in Emmetsburg, Iowa. This loan guarantee was later declined when the joint venture with Royal DSM was announced. Originally scheduled to open in 2013, the facility opened a year late in September, 2014. It closed down in 2020.
