= Syngas fermentation =

Syngas fermentation, also known as synthesis gas fermentation, is a microbial process. In this process, a mixture of hydrogen, carbon monoxide, and carbon dioxide, known as syngas, is used as carbon and energy sources, and then converted into fuel and chemicals by microorganisms.

The main products of syngas fermentation include ethanol, butanol, acetic acid, butyric acid, and methane. Certain industrial processes, such as petroleum refining, steel milling, and methods for producing carbon black, coke, ammonia, and methanol, discharge enormous amounts of waste gases containing mainly CO and H_{2} into the atmosphere either directly or through combustion. Biocatalysts can be exploited to convert these waste gases to chemicals and fuels as, for example, ethanol. In addition, incorporating nanoparticles has been demonstrated to improve gas-liquid fluid transfer during syngas fermentation.

There are several microorganisms which can produce fuels and chemicals by syngas utilization. These microorganisms are mostly known as acetogens including Clostridium ljungdahlii, Clostridium autoethanogenum, Eubacterium limosum, Clostridium carboxidivorans P7, Peptostreptococcus productus, and Butyribacterium methylotrophicum. Most use the Wood–Ljungdahl pathway.

Syngas fermentation process has advantages over a chemical process since it takes places at lower temperature and pressure, has higher reaction specificity, tolerates higher amounts of sulfur compounds, and does not require a specific ratio of CO to H_{2}. On the other hand, syngas fermentation has limitations such as:

- Gas-liquid mass transfer limitation
- Low volumetric productivity
- Inhibition of organisms.

== Reactor types ==
The most common utilized reactor type for syngas fermentation is the stirred-tank reactor in which the mass transfer is influenced by several factors such as geometry of the reactor, impeller configuration, the agitation speed and the gas flow rate. Additionally, less investigated reactor types like Trickle-bed reactors, bubble-column reactors and gas-lift reactors have specific drawbacks and advantages regarding the abovementioned limitations.
