= Coskata, Inc. =

American energy company

Coskata
- Type: Private
- Industry: Renewable Energy
- Founded: 1 July 2006; 2006
- Headquarters: Warrenville, Illinois, United States
- Products: Cellulosic Ethanol
- Website: www.coskata.com

Coskata, Inc. was a Warrenville, Illinois–based energy company incorporated in 2006 by serial entrepreneur Andrew Perlman's GreatPoint Ventures group. The company was developing processes for the production of cellulosic ethanol from woodchips. Coskata's process combines both biological (i.e., microbes) and thermochemical (heat and chemicals) processing. The estimated cost of production via this technology was reported as under $1 per gallon, as opposed to corn-based ethanol costing approximately $1.40 per gallon

Coskata announced in April 2008 that the company would begin producing ethanol on a small scale at a plant being built near Pittsburgh, Pennsylvania. With a capacity of about 40,000 US gallons (150,000 L) annually, the fuel will be used by General Motors to be tested in their vehicles. The pilot plant is being constructed in a modular design by Zeton Inc. in Burlington, Ontario, Canada. A full-scale production plant capable of producing 50 to 100 million US gallons (380,000 m^{3}) of cellulosic ethanol was expected to go online in 2011. In October 2011, an article on the Coskata website stated that a "semi-commercial" pilot plant in Madison, Pennsylvania, had been running successfully for two years.

In 2008, Coskata signed a deal with US Sugar Corporation to build a cane-waste biofuels conversion facility in Florida.

Competitors include Fulcrum BioEnergy and LanzaTech.

As of March 2013, the company's web site stated "While our technology platform is capable of producing multiple fuels and chemicals from a diverse array of feedstocks, we are initially focused on commercializing our natural gas conversion process."

The company went out of business in 2015, and the technology formerly belonging to Coskata has re-merged as the new company Synata Bio.
