= Jeff Broin =

American chairman & CEO (born 1965)

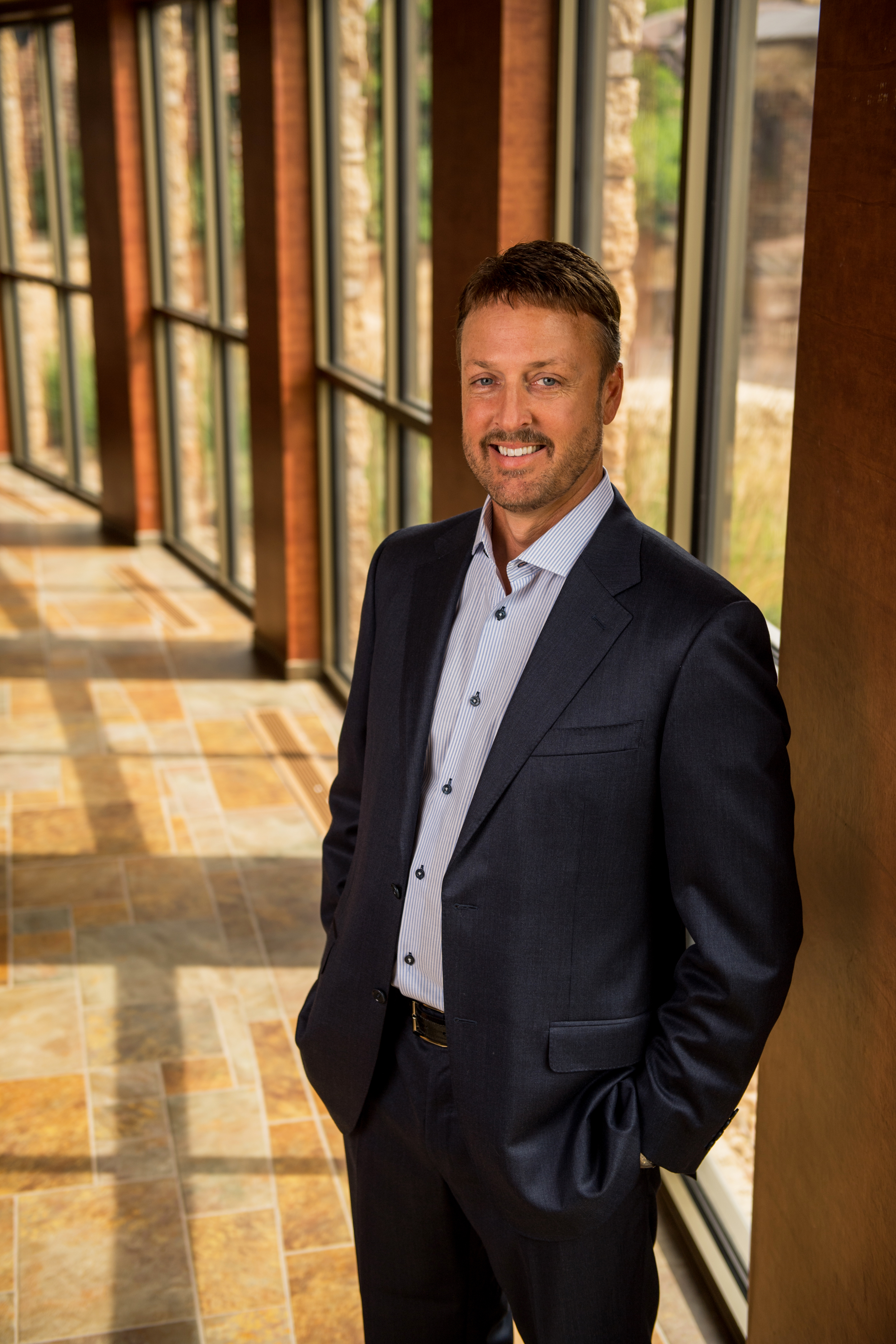
- Born: August 25, 1965 (age 61)
- Education: University of Wisconsin
- Employer: POET
- Title: Chairman and CEO, POET Board member, Growth Energy

Jeff Broin (born August 25, 1965) is the founder of POET, LLC, a leading producer of biofuels and coproducts. He currently serves as chairman and CEO.

== Life and career ==
Broin's family ran a farm in Minnesota. In the early 1980s, Broin's father began producing ethanol on the farm. In 1987, he mortgaged the farm to purchase an ethanol plant in Scotland, South Dakota, and put Jeff in charge of managing it. Jeff became the CEO of Broin Companies, and in 2007 renamed it to POET. It is now the world's largest biofuel producer, with 34 plants.

Broin advocates for the biofuels industry. He founded and serves on the board of Growth Energy, the leading biofuel trade association in the country.

In 2023, Jeff Broin joined Richard Childress as co-owner of the Carolina Cowboys; one of ten bull riding teams in the Professional Bull Riders (PBR) Team Series, which runs every summer and autumn in the United States. The Carolina Cowboys won the 2025 PBR Team Series Championship title.

== Awards and recognition ==
- 2017 recipient of the George Washington Carver Award for Innovation in Industrial Biotechnology. This award honors and recognizes an individual who has made significant contributions to building a biobased economy by applying industrial biotechnology to create environmentally sustainable products.
- 2017 inductee into the South Dakota Hall of Fame.
- 2017 recipient of Honorary Doctorate of Public Service from South Dakota State University.
- Keynote speaker at the 2018 Biotech Innovation Showcase.
- Keynote speaker at the 2018 University of South Dakota Distinguished Speaker Series.
- Global Bioeconomy Leadership Award
- Fortune's 2019 "Change the World" List
- Fast Company's 2019 "World's Most Innovative Companies"
- 2020 American Biofuels Visionary Award

== Health and Wellness Initiatives ==
POET places an emphasis on fitness and nutrition programs for its employees, offering exercise rooms, on-site health screenings, yearly blood and biometric screenings, and one-on-one health consultations.

== Philanthropy ==
In addition to many personal philanthropic endeavors, POET donates to local and national causes throughout its footprint. Some supported U.S. projects include Make-A-Wish, Children's Home Society, 4-H, and FFA, among many others. POET annually contributes to its local communities through Community Impact Grants. In 2024, these totaled $629,000.

In 2012, Broin and his wife, Tammie, founded the international non-profit Seeds of Change. Current projects include Mission Grow, which spreads agriculture technology by working with millions of farmers in over 18 countries; Mission Hope, an initiative to support vulnerable youth by building schools, improving education, providing resources, and feeding students in places including Kenya and Uganda; and Mission Thrive, which focuses on projects such as construction of clinics, potable water development, and health and nutrition education in countries Nigeria, Madagascar, El Salvador, and South Sudan.

In 2019, POET announced a $2 million gift for construction of the Raven Precision Agriculture facility at South Dakota State University, citing SDSU's increasing commitment to precision agriculture as an important venture. POET also gifted $5 million toward the POET Bioproducts Center, a first-of-its-kind research center at SDSU, which opened in October 2023.

== Personal life ==
Jeff Broin grew up near Kenyon, MN. He holds a degree in Agricultural Business from University of Wisconsin and is husband of over 27 years to his wife, Tammie, and father to three children - Alyssa, Miranda, and Austin.
