= Clostridium autoethanogenum =

Scientific classification
- Domain: Bacteria
- Kingdom: Bacillati
- Phylum: Bacillota
- Class: Clostridia
- Order: Eubacteriales
- Family: Clostridiaceae
- Genus: Clostridium
- Species: C. autoethanogenum

Binomial name
- Clostridium autoethanogenum Abrini et al. 1994

Species of bacterium

Clostridium autoethanogenum is an anaerobic bacterium that produces ethanol from carbon monoxide, in so-called syngas fermentation, being one of the few known microorganisms to do so. It is gram-positive, spore-forming, rod-like, motile, and was first isolated from rabbit feces. Its type strain is strain JA1-1. Its genome has been sequenced, and the genes required for utilizing carbon monoxide as a sole carbon and energy source have been determined.

As a chemoautotrophic gas-fermenting organism, it possesses the Wood-Ljungdahl carbon fixation pathway, which allows the conversion of C1-gases into the biomass precursor acetyl-CoA and other specific products, while generating ATP for growth.

== Uses ==
This species is the key to the technology developed by Lanzatech to produce ethanol on a commercial scale from waste carbon monoxide gas of factory emissions. On a laboratory scale, reports include production of butanol, 3-hydroxybutyrate, ethylene glycol and other compounds.
