= BlueFire Renewables =

American biofuel company

- Type: Public company OTCID Basic: BFRE
- Industry: Bioethanol
- Founded: 2006
- Headquarters: Irvine, California
- Key people: Arnold R. Klann, CEO
- Website: www.bfreinc.com

BlueFire Renewables (previously BlueFire Ethanol) is a biofuel company that produces a cellulose-to-ethanol solution using wood waste, agricultural residue and municipal waste. The company is headquartered in Irvine, California and is publicly traded in the U.S. on the OTC Bulletin Board under the ticker symbol "BFRE".

On August 17, 2010, BlueFire Ethanol Fuels rebranded itself as BlueFire Renewables.

== Technology ==
BlueFire Ethanol employs what it calls a "concentrated acid hydrolysis" process of converting waste material to ethanol. The technology, developed by and licensed from Arkenol Fuels in Orange County, California, reduces waste material to minuscule dimensions, where it is combined with sulfuric acid. This releases lignin structures within the biomass, where the sugar and acid are separated. The sugar goes into a yeast-fermenting process that results in its conversion to ethanol.

== Projects ==
In 2007, BlueFire Ethanol received US$40 million funding from the U.S. Department of Energy to construct a 19-million-US-gallon (72,000 m^{3}) per year cellulosic ethanol plant in Fulton, MS.

In 2008, the company unveiled plans to create a network of ethanol refineries located at landfills around the world. Under this plan, the landfill operators would receive US$6.00 per ton for the removal of their trash for processing into ethanol.

In 2009, Bluefire announced a teaming agreement with Solazyme, a renewable oil production company and leading algal synthetic biology company, that sugars produced through BlueFire's patented process will be used by Solazyme to produce various oils for fuel production.

In October 2014, BlueFire announced that it has received a Letter of Intent from The Export Import Bank of China (China EXIM) to provide up to $270 million in debt financing for its bio-energy project in Fulton, Mississippi. The Fulton, MS project will allow BlueFire to utilize green and wood wastes available in the region as feedstock for the ethanol plant that is designed to produce approximately 19-million gallons of ethanol per year.
