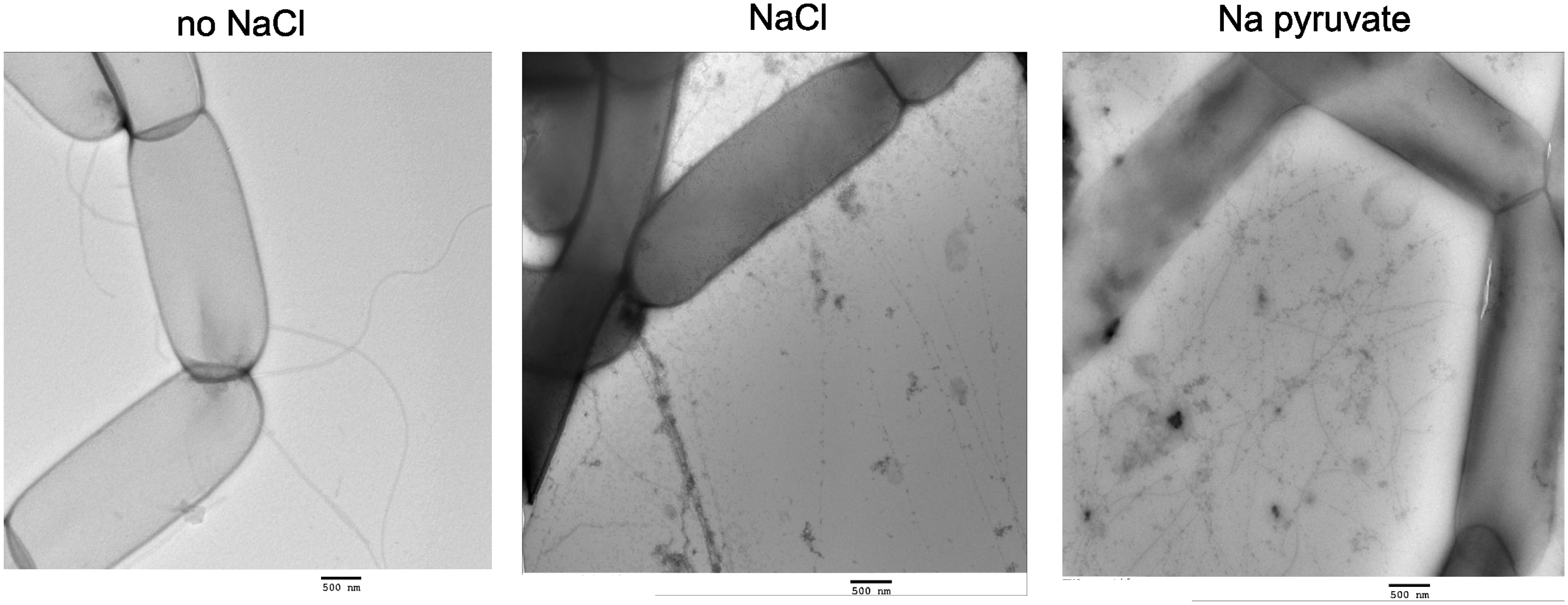

Scientific classification
- Domain: Bacteria
- Kingdom: Bacillati
- Phylum: Bacillota
- Class: Clostridia
- Order: Eubacteriales
- Family: Clostridiaceae
- Genus: Clostridium
- Species: C. ljungdahlii

Binomial name
- Clostridium ljungdahlii Tanner et al. 1993

= Clostridium ljungdahlii =

Species of bacterium

Clostridium ljungdahlii is species of anaerobic, rod-shaped, motile, endospore-forming, gram-positive bacterium from the family Clostridiaceae. It is named after the Swedish biochemist Lars G. Ljungdahl. When originally harvested from the waste matter of animals, C. ljungdahlii tended to produce acetate with respect to ethanol, but a major undertaking to increase the ethanol-to-acetate ratio was initiated. A 1993 publication by researchers from the University of Arkansas, in cooperation with Oak Ridge National Laboratories, showed results from a series of continuous reactor studies caused a major change in the bacterium's preference for ethanol production, which increased from <0.1 g/L to 1.8 g/L in a continuous stirred tank reactor.

This species can ferment certain components of syngas into ethanol. It also possesses properties of electrosynthesis, producing acetate on cathodes.
