= Enzymatic hydrolysis =

Enzyme-facilitated splitting of molecular bonds with water

In biochemistry, enzymatic hydrolysis is a process in which enzymes facilitate the cleavage of bonds in molecules with the addition of the elements of water (i.e. hydrolysis). It plays an important role in the digestion of food.

It may be used to help provide renewable energy, as with cellulosic ethanol.

== See also ==
- Acid hydrolysis
- Alkaline hydrolysis
- Digestion enzyme
