= Corn stover =

Corn (maize) plant parts left in field after harvest

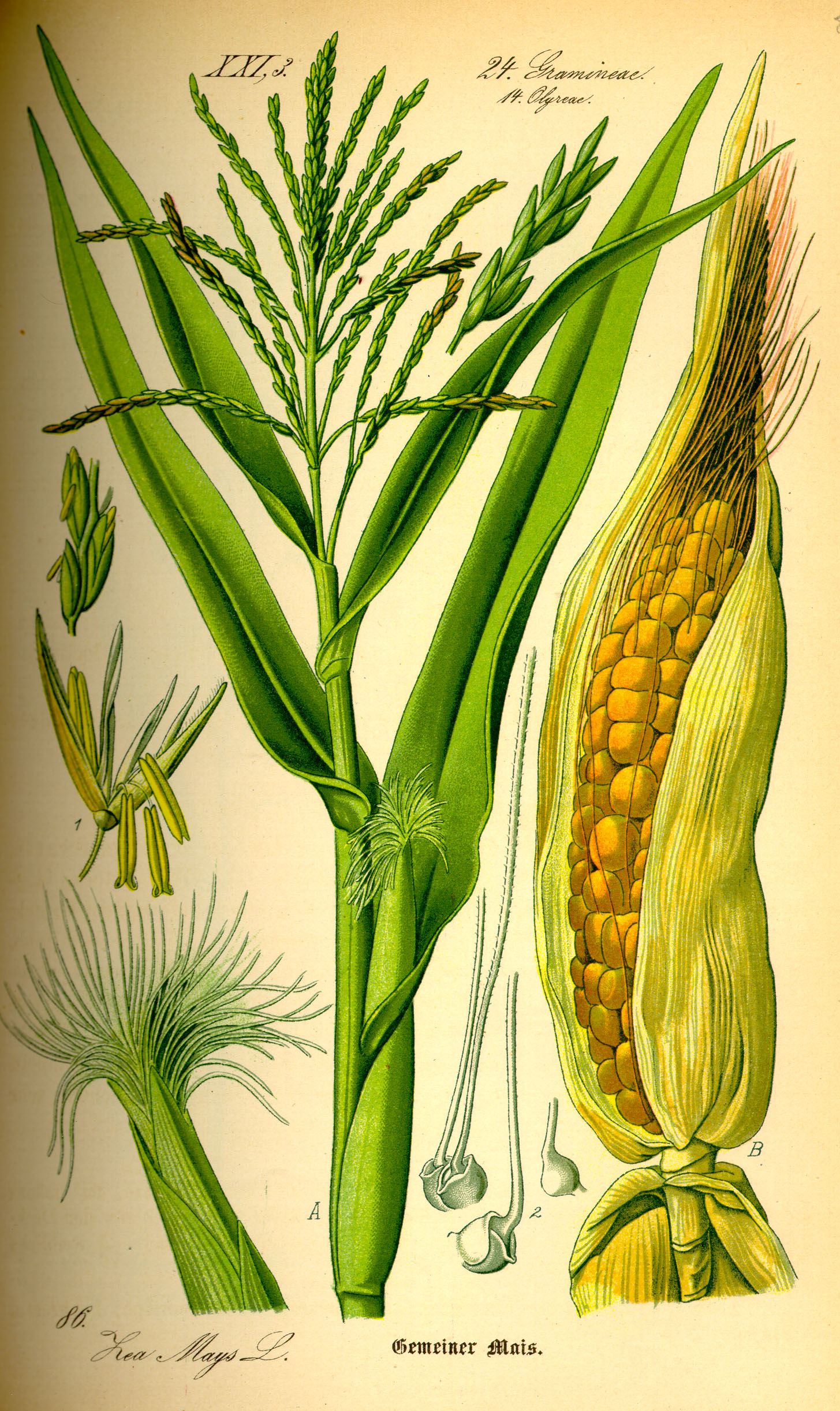
Zea mays ssp. mays L.

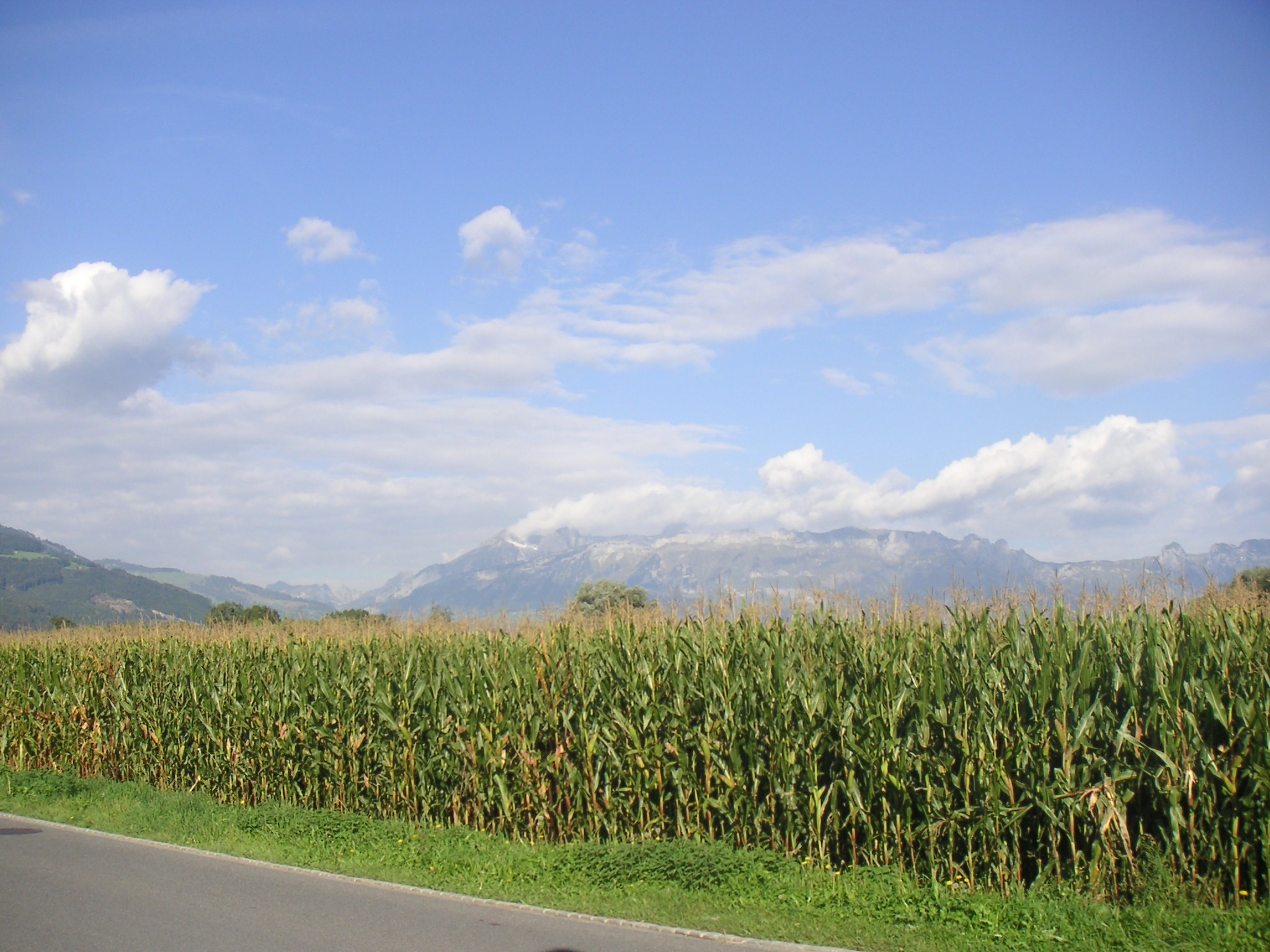
Corn field in Liechtenstein

Corn stover consists of the leaves, stalks, and cobs of corn (maize) (Zea mays ssp. mays L.) plants left in a field after harvest. Such stover makes up about half of the yield of a corn crop and is similar to straw from other cereal grasses; in Britain it is sometimes called corn straw. Corn stover is a very common agricultural product in areas of large amounts of corn production. As well as the non-grain part of harvested corn, the stover can also contain other weeds and grasses. Field corn and sweet corn, two different types of maize, have relatively similar corn stover.

== Uses ==
=== Fodder (ensilaged or nonensilaged) ===
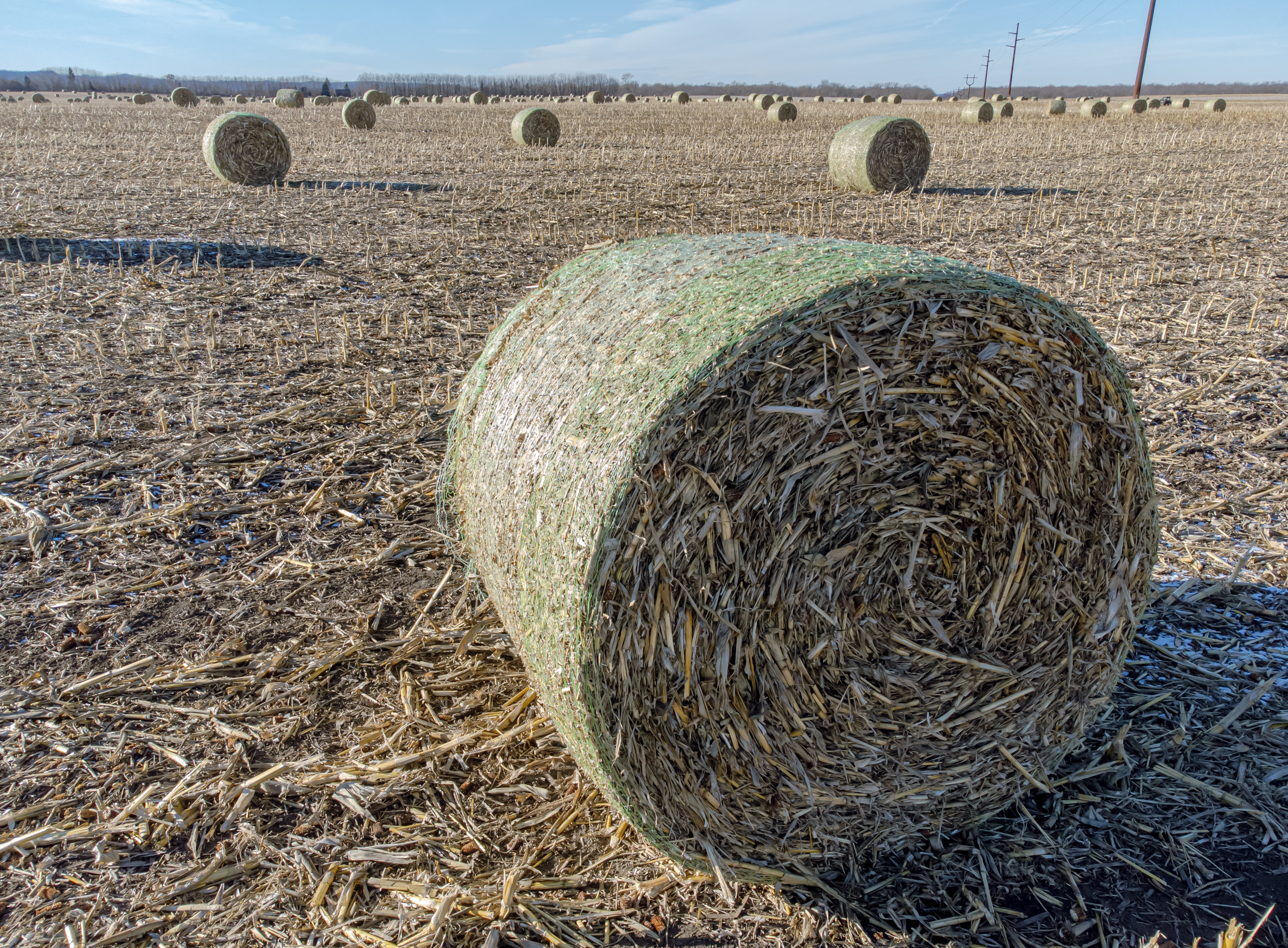
Baled cornstalks

Corn stover (like various other kinds of stover) can be used as feed, whether grazed as forage, chopped as silage to be used later for fodder, or collected for direct (nonensilaged) fodder use. Maize forage is usually ensiled in cooler regions, but it can be harvested year-round in the tropics and fed as green forage to the animals. In the silage use case, it is usual for the entire plant (grain and stover together) to be chopped into pieces which are then crushed between rollers while harvesting. Maize silage is one of the most valuable forages for ruminants. In dairy farming, corn silage is primarily used as fodder for dairy cows during the winter season. Corn stover can be beneficial to beef cattle producers because the "corn stover can provide a low cost feed source for mid-gestation beef cows". In addition to the stalks, leaves, husks, and cobs remaining in the field, kernels of grain may also be left over from harvest. These left over kernels, along with the corn stover, serve as an additional feed source for grazing cattle. Over time, the stalks will decrease in value as feed, so farmers aim to graze the corn stover as soon as possible after harvest. The amount of grazing possible on a field of corn stover is "between one and two months of grazing per cow per acre (50 cows on 50 acres (200,000 m^{2}) for one to two months)."

When corn stover is harvested intact (as opposed to the whole plant being chopped for silage, or the stover being left in the field by a combine), it can be cut and gathered by corn binders, which are reaper-binders designed specifically for maize. It can also be baled into large round bales.

=== Bedding (litter) followed by soil amendment ===
Instead of feed uses, corn stover can also be collected for use as bedding or litter for the livestock (that is, cellulosic bulk to catch and contain the animal manure), or it can be a vegetable manure that stays in the field as plant litter (serving as green manure, although less green than some others, with a higher C/N ratio). When used as bedding (barn litter), it is then removed and directly spread on the fields or composted (in long piles handled by loaders) for later field spreading. In either of the latter two use cases, it ends up as organic matter for soil amendment.

=== Direct soil amendment ===
The feed and bedding uses of corn stover are common, but the plant litter/vegetable manure use is also common. The latter is true for any combination of two reasons: (1) it helps to maintain soil health, and (2) when the corn crop is used as a grain crop (as opposed to a silage crop), harvesting the (grainless) stover simply does not pay; there is often no market demand for it that outweighs its value on the farm as soil maintenance, which represents an economic factor of its own. Regular annual harvesting of the whole corn plant (chopping for silage) is more challenging to soil management than is using the corn as a grain crop and mulching the field with the stover. Reincorporating the organic matter is good for the soil, although it must be managed properly to prevent nitrogen robbery of the next crop, as the high C/N ratio causes available nitrogen (fixed nitrogen) to be hoarded by the soil microbes diligently digesting the cellulose and lignin. They can outcompete the plants for the nitrogen. There are both organic and nonorganic ways to augment the nitrogen supply. Animal urine and manure is the main organic way, whereas commercial fertilizer is the main nonorganic way; both ways provide urea, which the microbes digest with their urease.

=== Bioenergy ===
Another use for corn stover is as fuel for bioenergy or as feedstock for bioproducts. It can be burned in furnaces to yield energy that steam turbines convert to electricity. It also has potential for cellulosic ethanol (biomass ethanol), which is "ethanol made from non-grain plant materials known as biomass."

==== Ethanol ====
However, with current technology, a large part of the biofuel potential of cellulose is wasted due to the strength of the glycosidic bonds that pair chains of D-glucose units. But if the commercialization of cellulosic ethanol advances enough technologically, biomass ethanol production would use the corn stover from the corn crop produced in areas around ethanol plants. Corn stover, due to the relative close proximity of the corn grain produced for ethanol production, "is by far the most abundant crop residue readily available today." The free accessibility to corn stover makes it a prime candidate for biomass ethanol production. DuPont opened a facility in Nevada, Iowa, that was expected to generate 30 million gallons annually of cellulosic biofuel produced from corn stover residues. The plant provisionally opened in 2015, but shut down in 2017 after a previous temporary shutdown in 2016. DuPont repaid $10.5 million of the $17.5 million in incentives received from the state of Iowa.

==== Methane ====
DuPont sold the Nevada plant to a German company, Verbio, who converted the plant from ethanol production to renewable natural gas production for eventual use as compressed natural gas (CNG) or liquified natural gas (LNG) vehicle fuel. Humus is also produced as a byproduct of natural gas production. Humus, alternatively known as digestate, is a value-added lignin- and nutrient-rich soil amendment similar to peat moss or compost which may be returned to feedstock suppliers or further processed into marketable products. As of 2021, Verbio is considering adding back ethanol production capabilities to the plant.

== Composition and properties ==
| Component | WT% dry |
|---|---|
| Cellulose/glucan | 37.4 |
| Xylan | 21.1 |
| Lignin | 18.0 |
| Ash | 5.2 |
| GCV | 18.6 MJ/kg |
| Protein | 3.1 |
| Acetate | 2.9 |
| Arabinan | 2.9 |
| Galactan | 2.0 |
| Mannan | 1.6 |

HHV: 19 MJ/kg DAF
