= Bagasse =

Residue of sugar cane after juice extraction

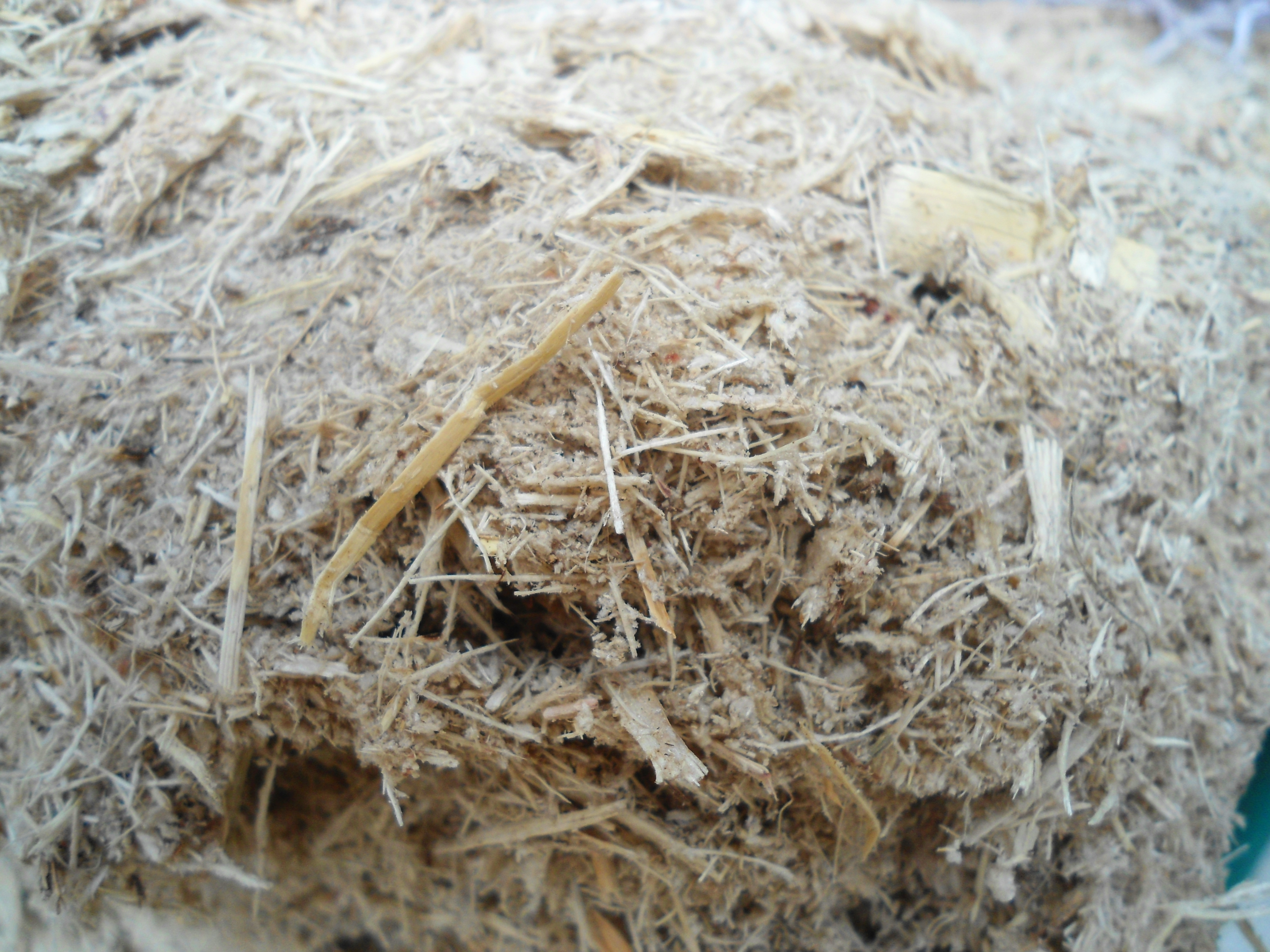
Sugarcane bagasse in Hainan, China

Bagasse (/bəˈɡæs/ bə-GAS) is the dry pulpy fibrous material that remains after crushing sugarcane or sorghum stalks to extract their juice. It is used as a biofuel for the production of heat, energy, and electricity, and in the manufacture of pulp and building materials. Agave bagasse is similar, but is the material remnants after extracting blue agave sap.

== Etymology ==
The word comes from bagasse (French) and bagazo (Spanish), meaning refuse or trash. It originally referred to the material left after pressing olives, palm nuts, and grapes. The word eventually came to be used in the context of processing of plants such as sugarcane and sugar beets. Today, it usually refers to by-products of the sugarcane mill.

== Description ==
Bagasse is the solid by-product when the liquid components are extracted from plants. Much of the core of those plants is a heterogeneous "pith" fibre. This fibre is primarily parenchyma tissue, along with bast, rind, or stem fibers of the sclerenchyma.

An example chemical analysis of washed and dried bagasse:

- Cellulose: 45–55%
- Hemicellulose: 20–25%
- Lignin: 18–24%
- Ash: 1–4%
- Waxes: <1%

== Production ==
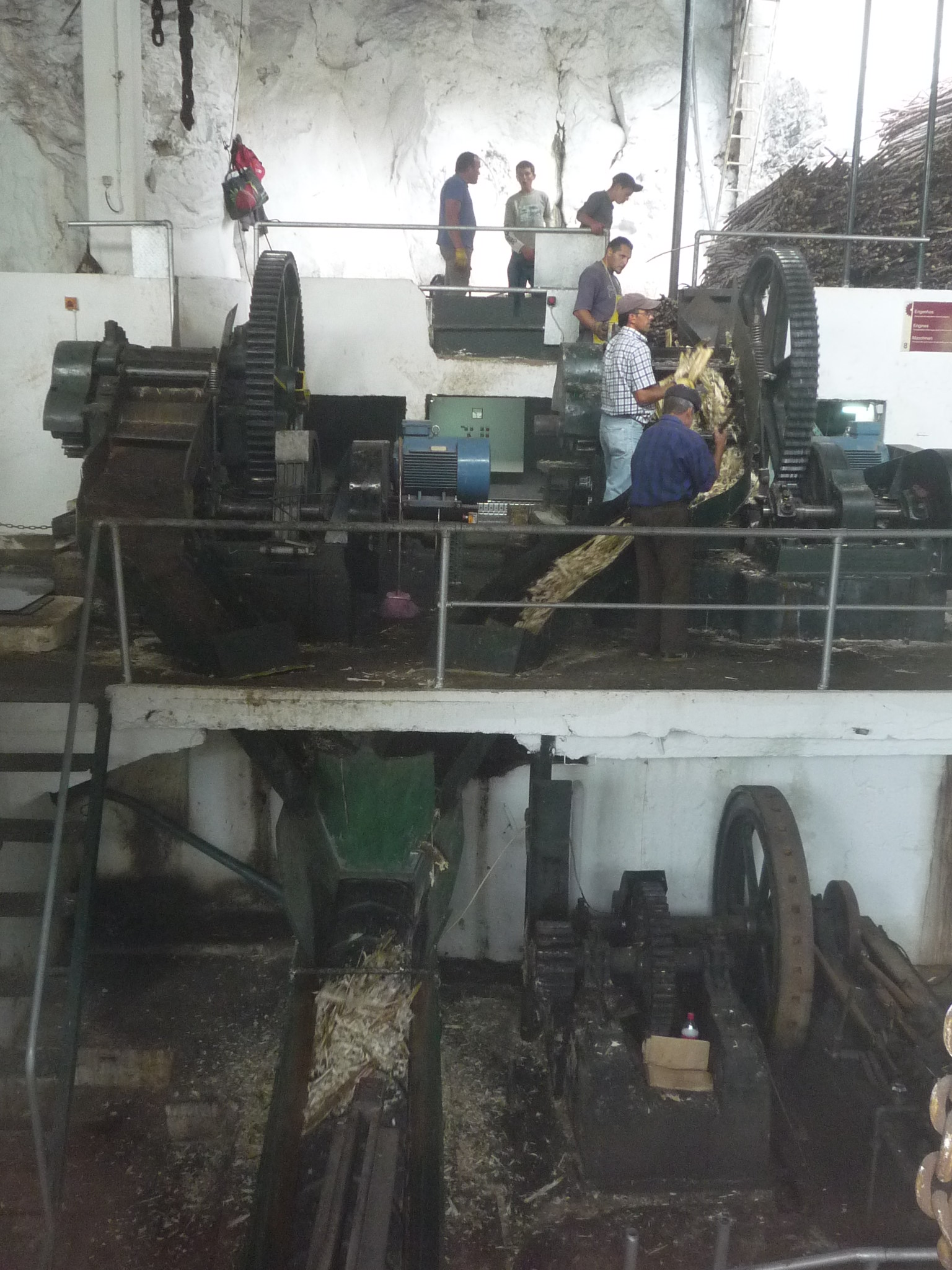
Sugarcane being crushed in Engenho da Calheta, Madeira. The bagasse falls down a chute and is removed on a conveyor belt below.

For every 10 tonnes of sugarcane crushed, a sugar factory produces nearly three tonnes of wet bagasse. It is challenging to use this byproduct directly as a fuel because of the high moisture content, typically 40–50 percent. Instead, bagasse is typically stored prior to further processing.

For electricity production, the bagasse is stored under moist conditions. Under these conditions, the bagasse undergoes a mild exothermic process as the residual sugars slightly degrade.

For paper and pulp production, the bagasse is normally stored wet so as to facilitate the subsequent removal of any remaining sugar as well as the short pith fibres. These fibres would impede the paper making process.

== Uses ==
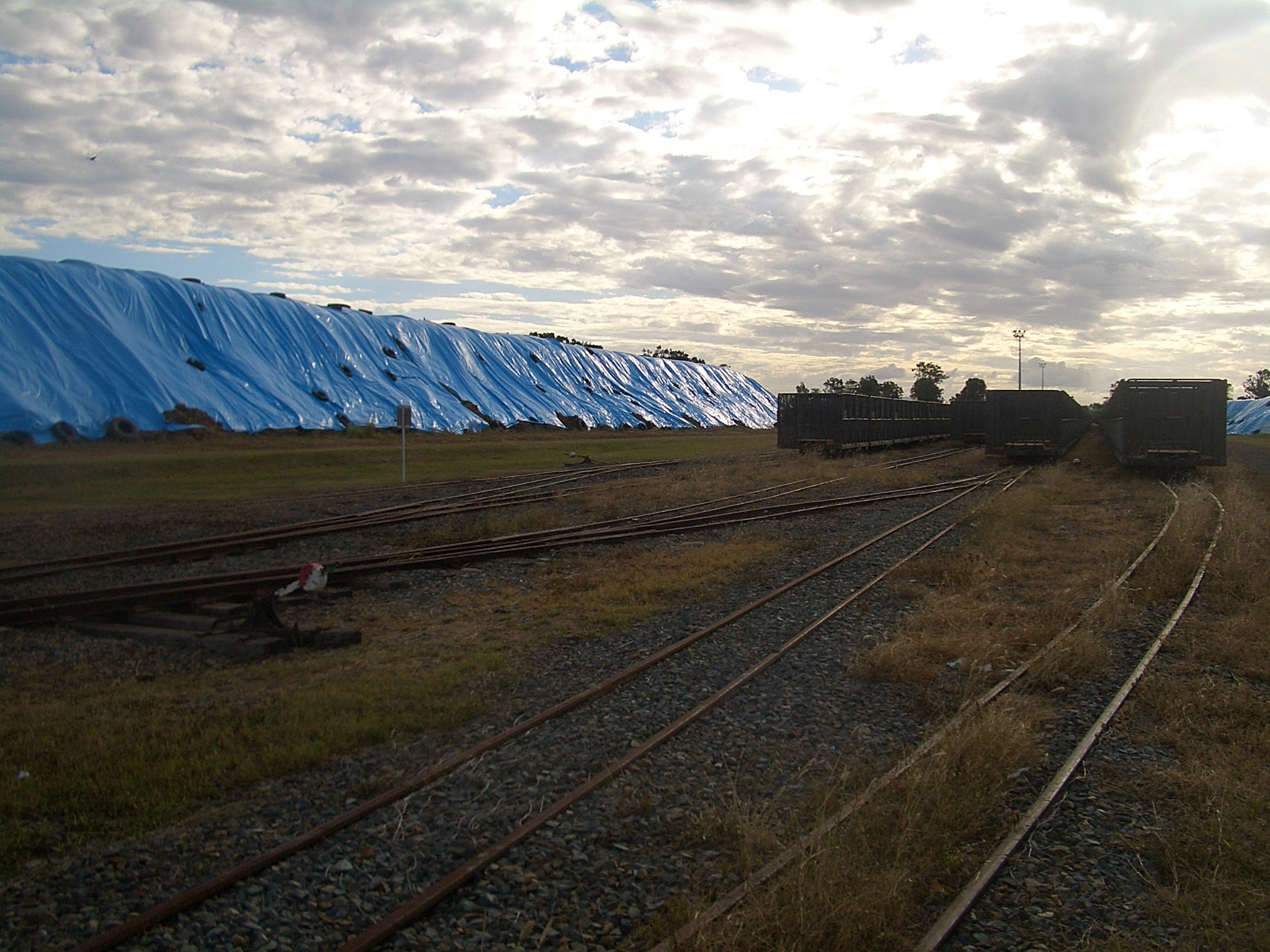
Bagasse covered with blue plastic outside a sugar mill in Proserpine, Queensland

Numerous research efforts have explored using bagasse in the production of bio-based materials and as a biofuel in renewable power generation.

=== Biochar ===
Sugarcane bagasse biomass (SB) has the potential to be transformed into energy, materials and chemicals.

=== Fuel ===
Sugar mills often use bagasse as a primary fuel source. When burned in quantity, bagasse produces enough heat energy to fully power a typical sugar mill, with some energy to spare. Cogeneration is a common setup, with this extra energy sold to the consumer electrical grid. Historically, bagasse was also used to fuel steam locomotives that brought the cut cane to the mills.

The CO_{2} emissions from burning the bagasse in a sugarcane plant is less than the amount of CO_{2} absorbed from the atmosphere when the sugarcane grows, which could make the process carbon-neutral or better. In contrast, a study in the International Journal of Global Warming warned that electricity generation with bagasse would never be fully carbon-free but did represent a large reduction in carbon emissions compared to the use of diesel. In countries such as Australia, sugar factories contribute this "green" power to the electricity grid. Hawaiian Electric Industries also burns bagasse for cogeneration.

Ethanol produced from the sugar is a popular fuel in Brazil. The cellulose-rich bagasse is also being investigated for its potential in producing commercial quantities of cellulosic ethanol. For example, until May 2015, BP operated a cellulosic ethanol demonstration plant in Jennings, Louisiana.

In the Guangxi Zhuang Autonomous Region in China, bagasse is sometimes used to smoke bacon and sausages.

=== Feedstock ===
Bagasse from sugarcane production offers an attractive feedstock for the production of biofuel and value-added products as it does not affect food security. Second generation biohydrogen, biomethane, biomethanol, or bioethanol through the biochemical route is considered to not only be an eco-friendly, but also economically feasible option. Thermochemical production pathways, such as hydrothermal liquefaction, pyrolysis and gasification of bagasse are a promising alternative to produce advanced 2G biofuels (e.g. jet fuel and Diesel) and chemicals (e.g. for plastics) with low life cycle impacts.

=== Pulp, paper, board and packaging ===
In many tropical and subtropical countries such as India, China, Colombia, Iran, Thailand, and Argentina, bagasse is commonly used instead of wood in the production of pulp, paper and board. This substitution produces pulp with physical properties that are well suited for printing and notebook paper, tissue products, boxes, and newspapers. It can also be used for making boards resembling plywood or particle board, known as bagasse boards and Xanita boards. These are widely used in the production of partitions and furniture.

The industrial steps to convert bagasse into paper were developed in 1937 at a small laboratory in Hacienda Paramonga, a sugar mill on the coast of Peru owned by the W.R. Grace Company. Using a promising method invented by Clarence Birdseye, the company bought an old paper mill in Whippany, New Jersey and shipped bagasse from Peru there to test the viability of the process on an industrial scale. The first bagasse paper manufacturing machines were designed in Germany and installed in the Cartavio sugar cane plant in 1938.

On January 26–27, 1950, the Noble & Wood Machine Company, the Kinsley Chemical Company, and the Chemical Paper Company jointly demonstrated the first successful commercial production of newsprint produced from bagasse at Chemical Paper's mills in Holyoke. The process's first use was in the printing of a special edition of the Holyoke Transcript-Telegram. This demonstration was done in collaboration with the governments of Puerto Rico and Argentina due to the economic importance of the product in countries without ready access to wood fibers. The work was presented before representatives of 100 industrial interests and officials from 15 countries.

Bagasse has become a popular materials choice for tableware packaging. The material is suitable for both cold and hot applications (up to ~120 °C). Additionally, it can be put in the freezer and microwave without problems. It also has reasonably good water- and grease resistance, which can be enhanced by chemical modification.

Historically, PFOA and related fluorinated materials were commonly used to increase heat, water and grease resistance. However, the use of these have now been banned. Other means of enhancing the material properties of bagasse are mixing with gelatin, starch or agar.

=== Nanocellulose ===
Nanocellulose, a higher-value product, can be produced from bagasse through various conventional and novel processes.

== Health impact ==
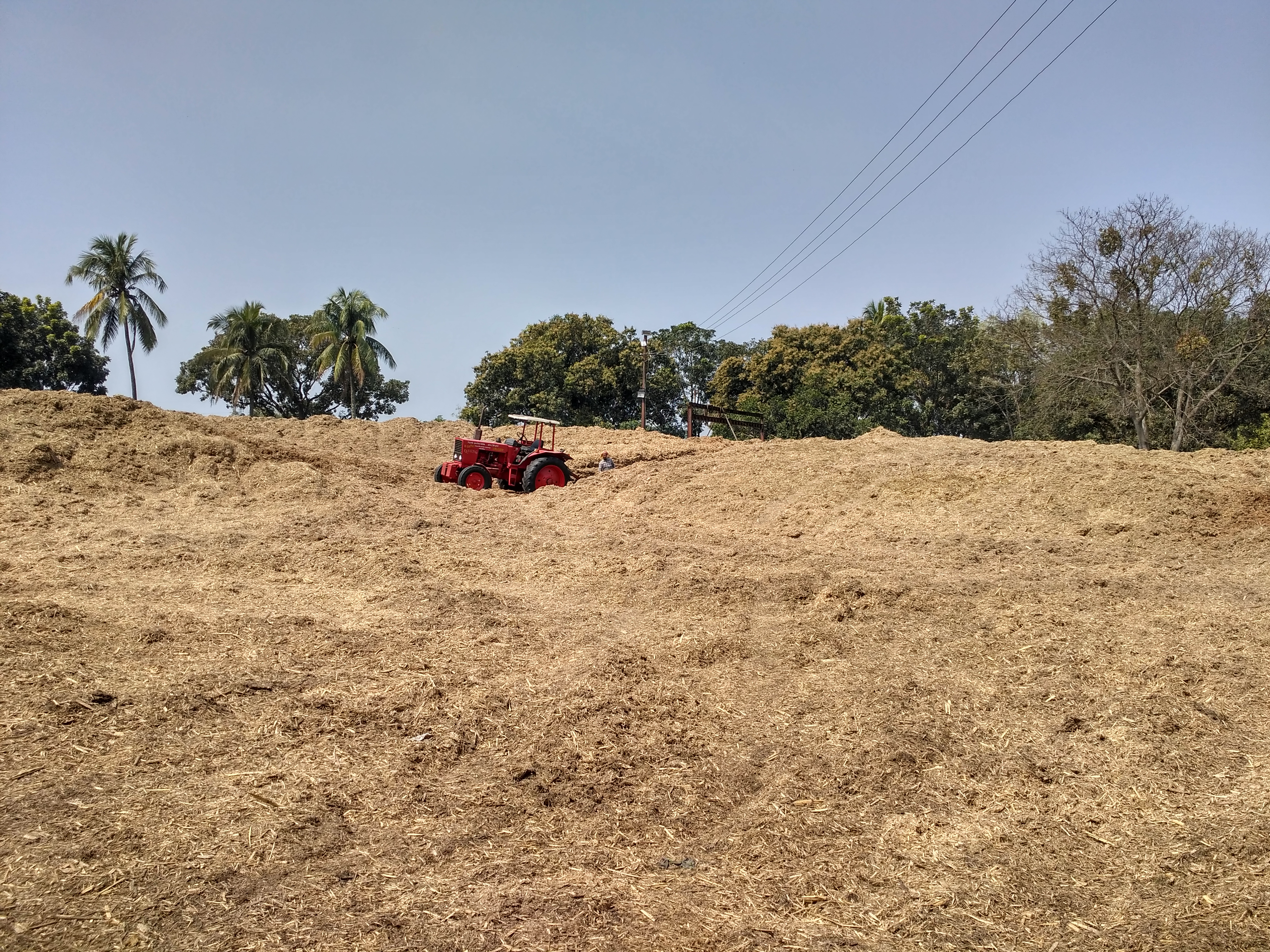
Sugarcane bagasse piled outside a mill, to be used as fuel for the mill's boilers.

Workplace exposure to dust from the processing of bagasse can cause bagassosis, a subtype of the chronic lung condition pulmonary fibrosis.

=== Human consumption ===
Sugarcane fiber, a variety of processed bagasse, is sometimes added to human food. It is a soluble fiber that can help promote intestinal regularity. One animal study suggests that sugarcane fiber combined with a high-fat diet may help control type 2 diabetes. It is a good source of lignoceric and cerotic acids.

== See also ==
- Biofuel
- Bioenergy
- Corn stover
- Pomace
