= Ethanol fuel =

Type of biofuel

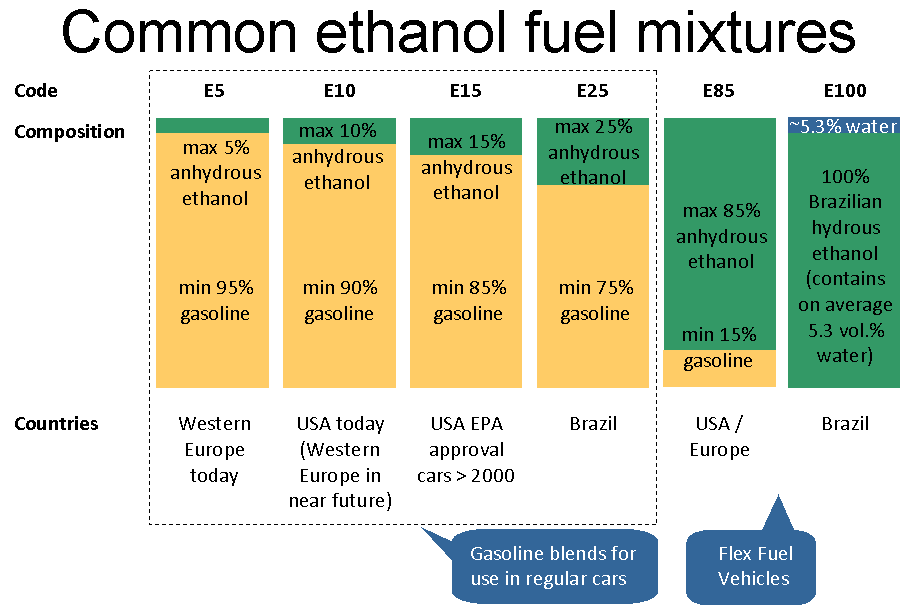
Summary of the main ethanol blends used around the world in 2013

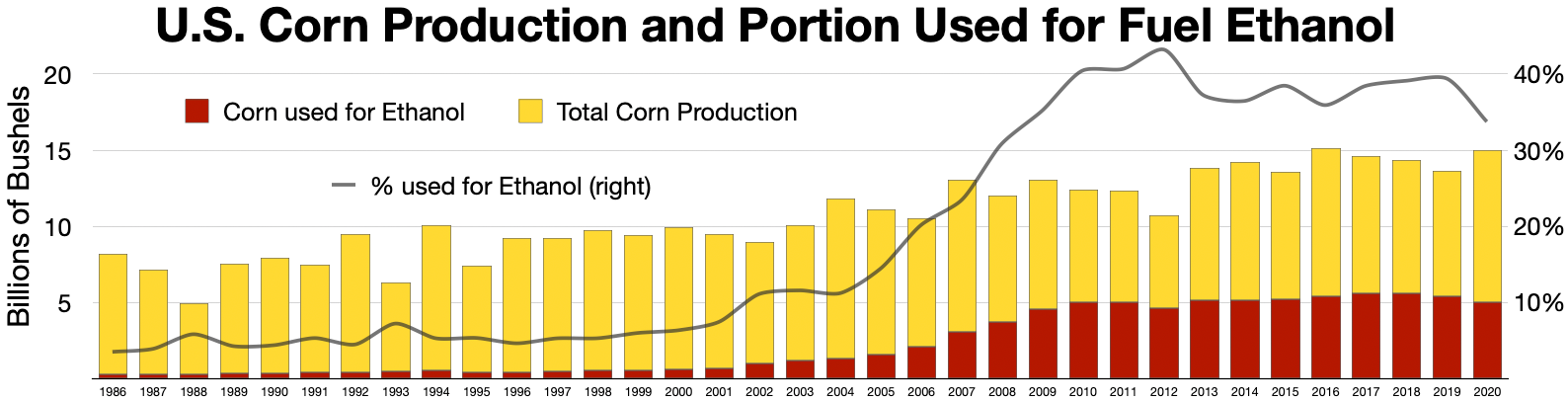
Corn vs Ethanol production in the United States Total corn production (bushels) (left) Corn used for Ethanol fuel (bushels) (left) Percent of corn used for Ethanol (right)

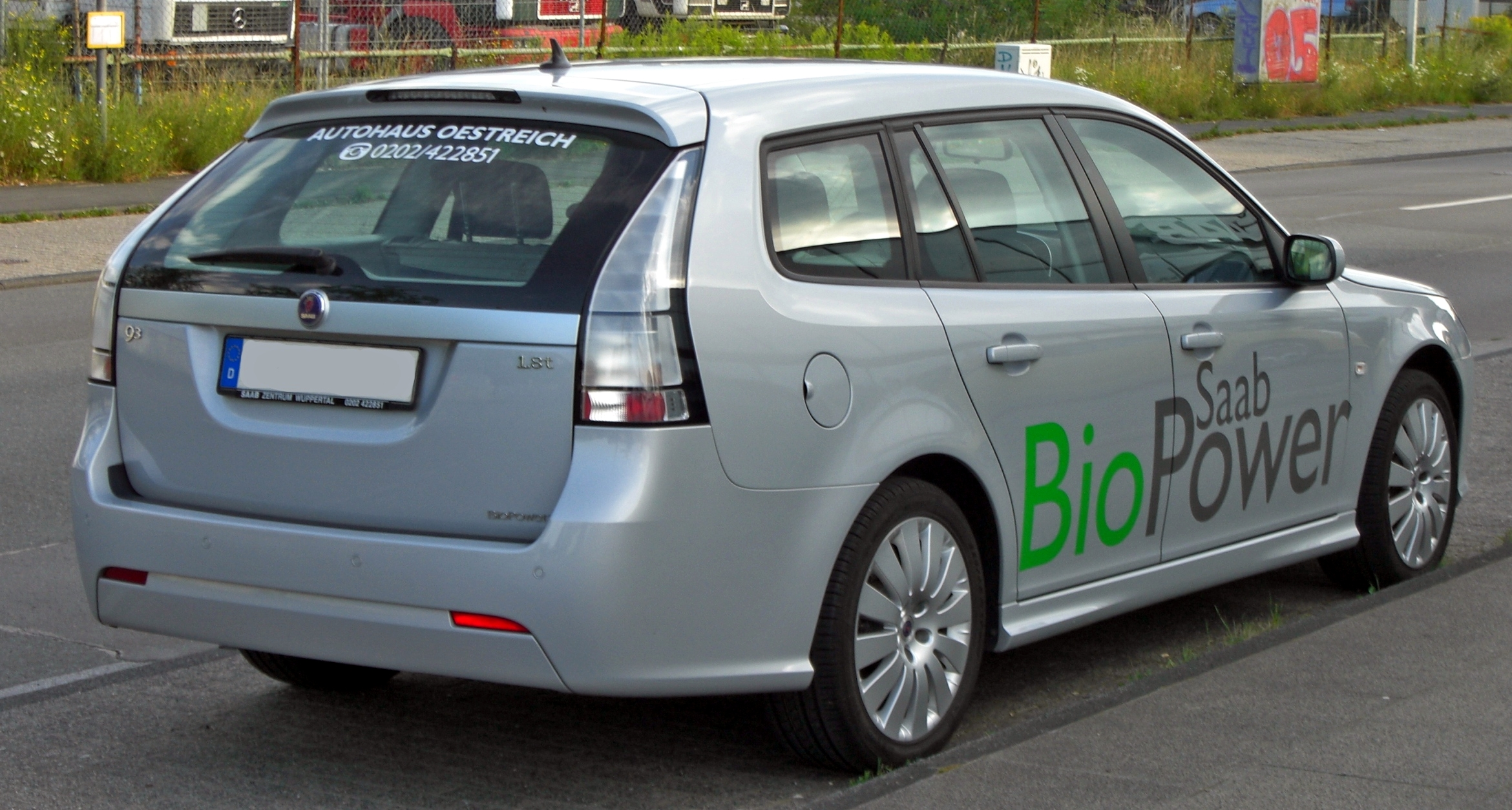
The Saab 9-3 SportCombi BioPower was the second E85 flexifuel model introduced by Saab in the Swedish market.

Ethanol fuel is an alcohol-based fuel commonly produced by fermenting sugars from crops such as corn, sugarcane, and other biomass, although it can also be synthesized from petroleum derivatives. While it is the same type of alcohol as found in alcoholic beverages, it is most often used as an alternative to gasoline in transportation, either as a pure fuel or blended into gasoline mixtures as a biofuel additive, to reduce reliance on fossil fuels and lower greenhouse gas emissions. Ethanol fuel in Brazil and the United States dominate global ethanol production, together accounting for the majority of supply, and many countries mandate ethanol blending in automotive fuels.

Historically, ethanol has been used as a fuel since the early 20th century, with Brazil pioneering large-scale adoption during the 1970s energy crisis. Advances in flexible-fuel vehicle technology and government policies have expanded its use worldwide. Ethanol's chemical composition (C_{2}H_{5}OH) allows it to burn cleanly, producing carbon dioxide and water, and its high octane rating makes it suitable for high-compression engines. Most ethanol is produced through microbial fermentation of sugars, followed by distillation and dehydration, though synthetic ethanol from ethylene remains a small share of global output.

Ethanol is considered a renewable energy source, but its production raises environmental and economic concerns. While sugarcane-based ethanol in Brazil offers a favorable energy balance and lower carbon emissions compared to gasoline, corn-based ethanol in the United States provides more modest benefits. Large-scale cultivation for ethanol can affect food prices, water resources, and land use, and emissions from production and combustion vary by feedstock and process. Research continues into cellulosic ethanol and other advanced methods to improve sustainability and reduce environmental impact.

Several common ethanol fuel mixtures are in use around the world. The use of pure hydrous or anhydrous ethanol in internal combustion engines (ICEs) is possible only if the engines are designed or modified for that purpose. Anhydrous ethanol can be blended with gasoline (petrol) for use in gasoline engines, but only after engine modifications are made since pure ethanol contains only a fraction of the energy of an equivalent volume of pure gasoline. Despite its inefficiency compared to gasoline, ethanol is eco-friendlier and produces less greenhouse emissions upon combustion due to more complete combustion as compared to gasoline, leading to less toxic gases emitted, making it an eco-friendly alternative.

== History and use ==
Global ethanol production for transport fuel tripled between 2000 and 2007 and ethanol production in general has increased over time, although production fell in 2020 due to the COVID-19 pandemic. Ethanol-blended fuel is widely used in Brazil, the United States, Canada, and Europe (see also Ethanol fuel by country). Most cars on the road today in the U.S. can run on blends of up to 15% ethanol, and ethanol represented 10% of the U.S. gasoline fuel supply derived from domestic sources in 2011. Some flexible-fuel vehicles are able to use up to 100% ethanol.

The first production car running entirely on ethanol was the Fiat 147, introduced in 1978 in Brazil by Fiat. Since 1976 the Brazilian government has made it mandatory to blend ethanol with gasoline, and since 2007 the legal blend is around 25% ethanol and 75% gasoline (E25). By December 2011 Brazil had a fleet of 14.8 million flex-fuel automobiles and light trucks and 1.5 million flex-fuel motorcycles that regularly use neat ethanol fuel (known as E100).

World ethanol production for transport fuel tripled between 2000 and 2007 from 17×10^{9} liters (4.5×10^{9} U.S. gal; 3.7×10^{9} imp gal) to more than 52×10^{9} liters (14×10^{9} U.S. gal; 11×10^{9} imp gal). From 2007 to 2008, the share of ethanol in global gasoline type fuel use increased from 3.7% to 5.4%. In 2011 worldwide ethanol fuel production reached 8.46×10^{9} liters (2.23×10^{9} U.S. gal; 1.86×10^{9} imp gal) with the United States of America and Brazil being the top producers, accounting for 62.2% and 25% of global production, respectively. US ethanol production reached 57.54×10^{9} liters (15.20×10^{9} U.S. gal; 12.66×10^{9} imp gal) in May 2017.

== Chemistry ==
Structure of ethanol molecule. All bonds are single bonds.

During ethanol fermentation, sugars like glucose and others in the corn (or sugarcane or other crops) are converted into ethanol and carbon dioxide.

C_{6}H_{12}O_{6} → 2 C_{2}H_{5}OH+ 2 CO_{2} + heat

Ethanol fermentation is not 100% selective with side products such as acetic acid and glycols. They are mostly removed during ethanol purification. Fermentation takes place in an aqueous solution. The resulting solution has an ethanol content of around 15%. Ethanol is subsequently isolated and purified by a combination of adsorption and distillation.

During combustion, ethanol reacts with oxygen to produce carbon dioxide, water, and heat:

C_{2}H_{5}OH + 3 O_{2} → 2 CO_{2} + 3 H_{2}O + heat

Starch and cellulose molecules are strings of glucose molecules. It is also possible to generate ethanol out of cellulosic materials. That, however, requires a pretreatment that splits the cellulose into glucose molecules and other sugars that subsequently can be fermented. The resulting product is called cellulosic ethanol, indicating its source.

Ethanol is also produced industrially from ethylene by hydration of the double bond in the presence of a catalyst and high temperature.

C_{2}H_{4} + H_{2}O → C_{2}H_{5}OH

Most ethanol is produced by fermentation.

== Sources ==
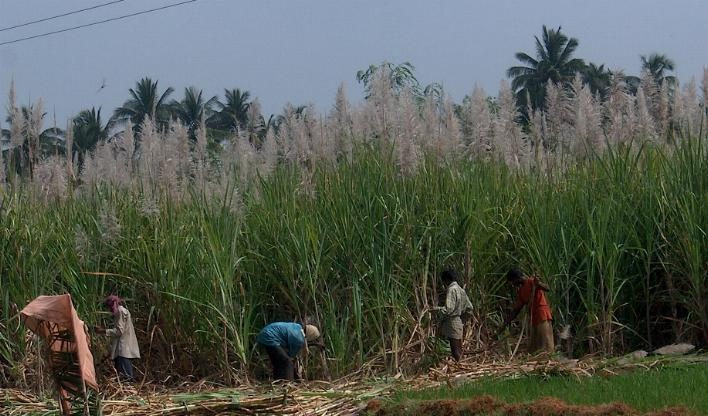
Sugar cane harvest

Maize biomass harvest

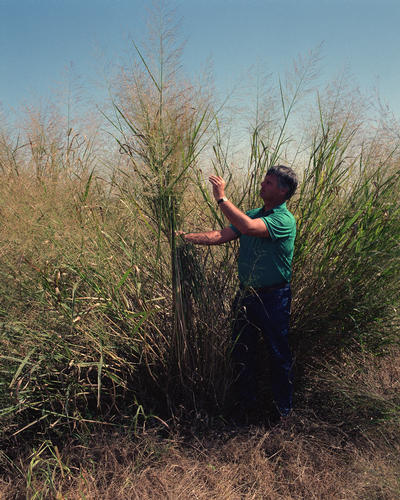
Switchgrass

About 5% of the ethanol produced in the world in 2003 was actually a petroleum product. It is made by the catalytic hydration of ethylene with sulfuric acid as the catalyst. It can also be obtained via ethylene or acetylene, from calcium carbide, coal, oil gas, and other sources. Two million short tons (1,786,000 long tons; 1,814,000 t) of petroleum-derived ethanol are produced annually. The principal suppliers are plants in the United States, Europe, and South Africa. Petroleum derived ethanol (synthetic ethanol) is chemically identical to bioethanol and can be differentiated only by radiocarbon dating.

Bioethanol is usually obtained from the conversion of carbon-based feedstock. Agricultural feedstocks are considered renewable because they get energy from the sun using photosynthesis, provided that all minerals required for growth (such as nitrogen and phosphorus) are returned to the land. Ethanol can be produced from a variety of feedstocks such as sugar cane, bagasse, miscanthus, sugar beet, sorghum, switchgrass, barley, hemp, kenaf, potatoes, sweet potatoes, cassava, sunflower, fruit, molasses, corn, stover, grain, wheat, straw, cotton, other biomass, as well as many types of cellulose waste and harvesting, whichever has the best well-to-wheel assessment.

In 2008 an alternative process to produce bioethanol from algae was announced by the company Algenol. Rather than grow algae and then harvest and ferment it, the algae grow in sunlight and produce ethanol directly, which is removed without killing the algae. It is claimed the process can produce 6,000 U.S. gallons per acre (5,000 imperial gallons per acre; 56,000 liters per hectare) per year compared with 400 US gallons per acre (330 imp gal/acre; 3,700 L/ha) for corn production. In 2015 the project was abandoned.

The first generation processes for the production of ethanol from corn use only a small part of the corn plant: the corn kernels are taken from the corn plant and only the starch, which represents about 50% of the dry kernel mass, is transformed into ethanol. Two types of second generation processes are under development. The first type uses enzymes and yeast fermentation to convert the plant cellulose into ethanol while the second type uses pyrolysis to convert the whole plant to either a liquid bio-oil or a syngas. Second generation processes can also be used with plants such as grasses, wood or agricultural waste material such as straw.

== Production ==
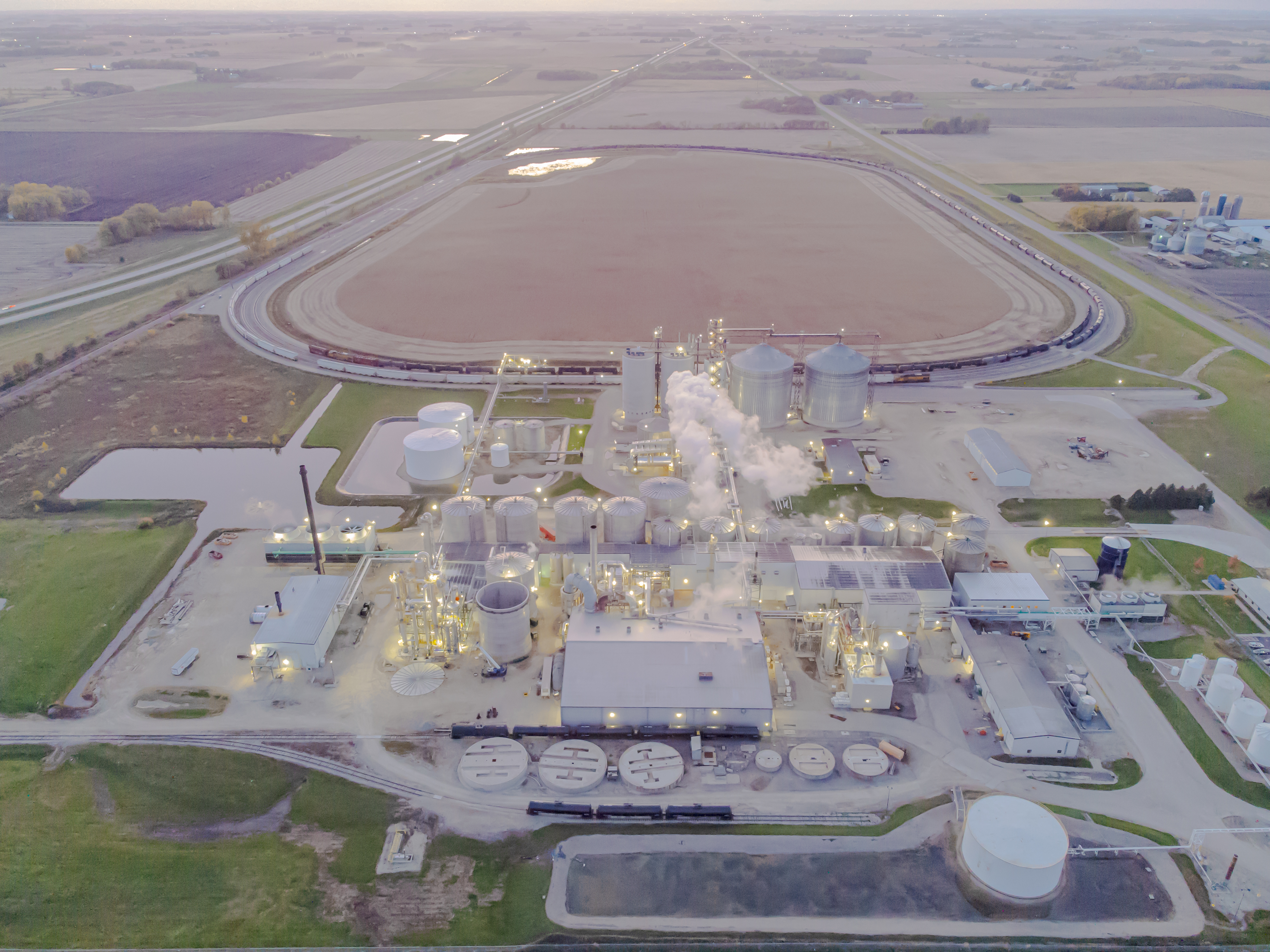
Ethanol plant in Claremont, Minnesota

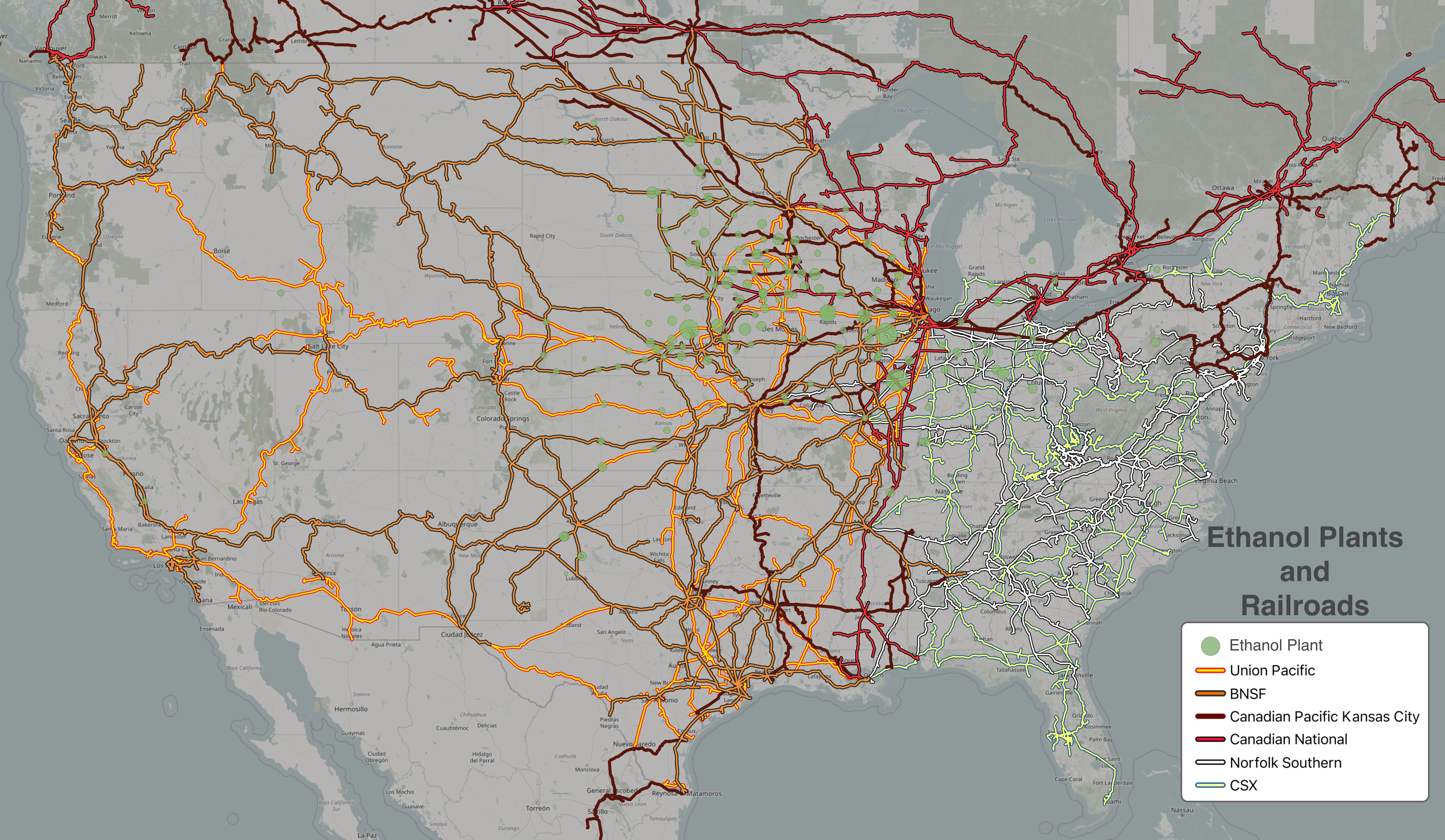
Ethanol plants in the US

Bioethanol is a form of renewable energy that can be produced from agricultural feedstocks. It can be made from very common crops such as hemp, sugarcane, potato, cassava and corn. There has been considerable debate about how useful bioethanol is in replacing gasoline. Concerns about its production and use relate to increased food prices due to the large amount of arable land required for crops (see: Indirect land use change impacts of biofuels), as well as the energy and pollution balance of the whole cycle of ethanol production, especially from corn.

Although there are various ways ethanol fuel can be produced, the most common way is via fermentation.

The basic steps for large-scale production of ethanol are: microbial (yeast) fermentation of sugars, distillation, dehydration (requirements vary, see Ethanol fuel mixtures, below), and denaturing (optional). Prior to fermentation, some crops require saccharification or hydrolysis of carbohydrates such as cellulose and starch into sugars. Saccharification of cellulose is called cellulolysis (see cellulosic ethanol). Enzymes are used to convert starch into sugar.

=== Fermentation ===
Ethanol is produced by microbial fermentation of the sugar. Microbial fermentation currently only works directly with sugars. Two major components of plants, starch and cellulose, are both made of sugars—and can, in principle, be converted to sugars for fermentation. Currently, only the sugar (e.g., sugar cane) and starch (e.g., corn) portions can be economically converted.

There is interest in cellulosic ethanol obtained from breaking down plant cellulose to sugars and converting the sugars to ethanol. However, cellulosic ethanol is currently uneconomical and not practiced commercially. According to a 2006 International Energy Agency report, cellulosic ethanol could be important in the future.

=== Distillation ===
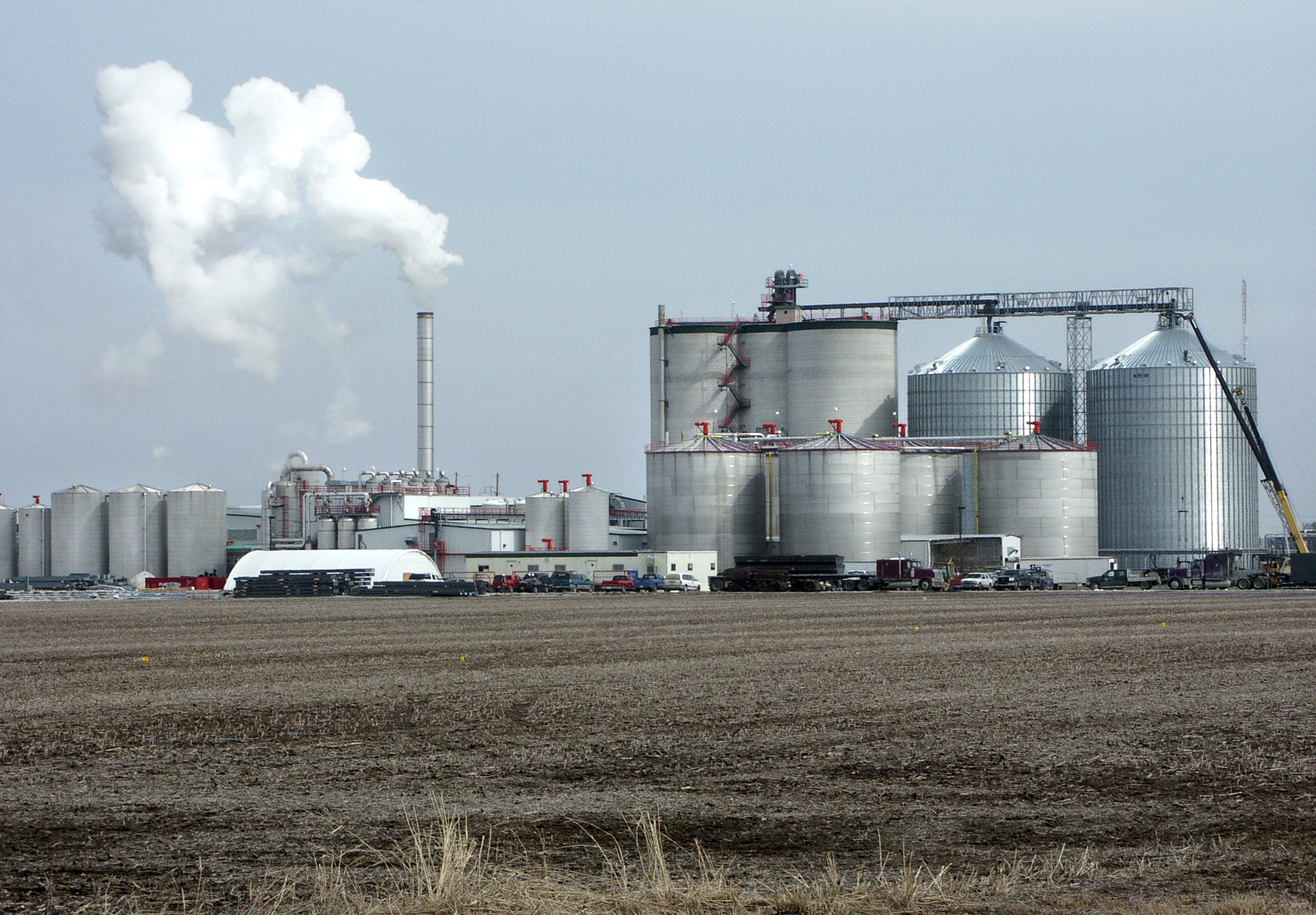
Ethanol plant in West Burlington, Iowa

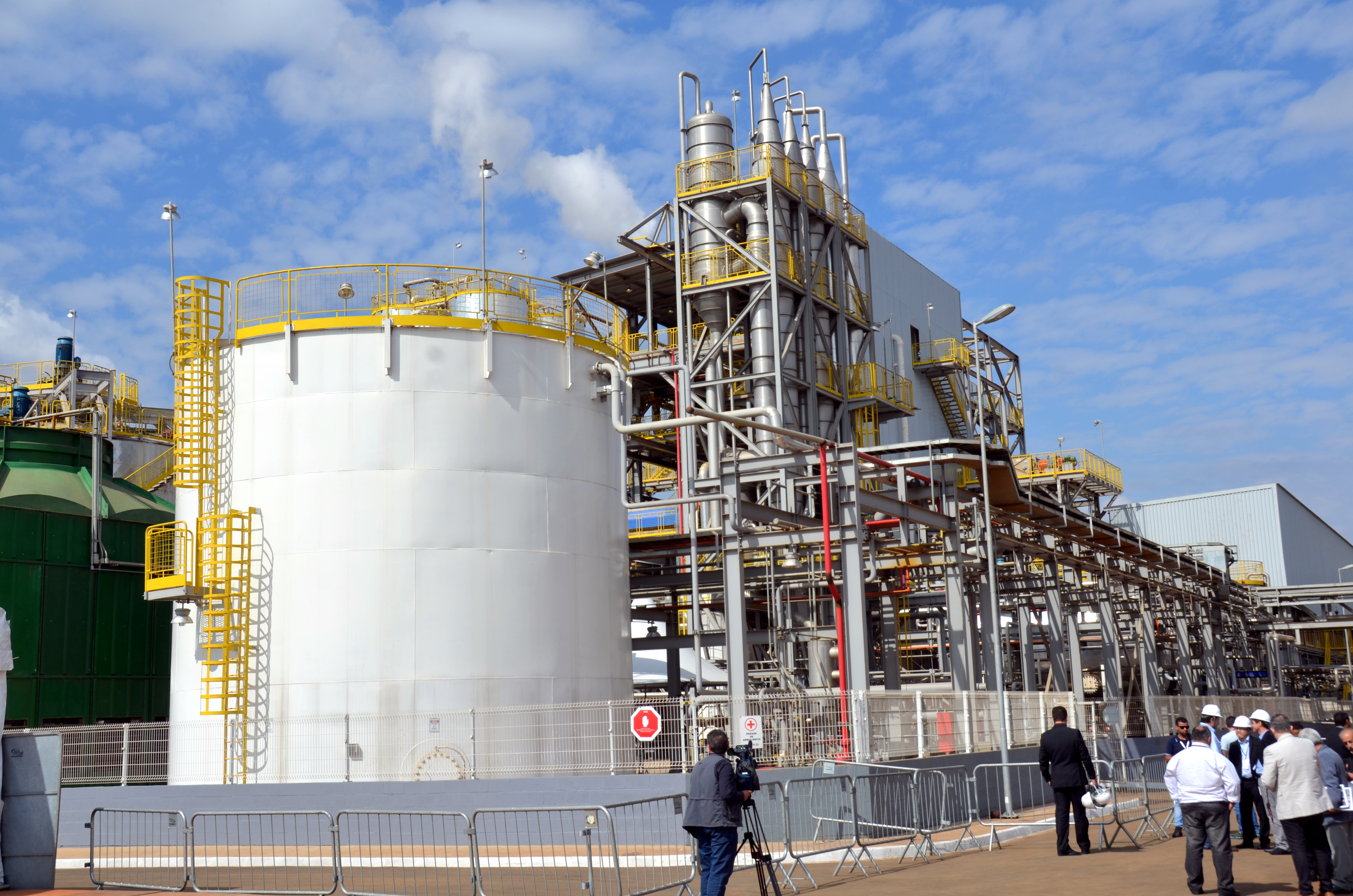
Ethanol plant in Piracicaba, Brazil

For the ethanol to be usable as a fuel, the yeast solids and the majority of the water must be removed. After fermentation, the mash is heated so that the ethanol evaporates. This process, known as distillation, separates the ethanol, but its purity is limited to 95–96% due to the formation of a low-boiling water-ethanol azeotrope with maximum (95.6% m/m (96.5% v/v) ethanol and 4.4% m/m (3.5% v/v) water). This mixture is called hydrous ethanol and can be used as a fuel alone, but unlike anhydrous ethanol, hydrous ethanol is not miscible in all ratios with gasoline, so the water fraction is typically removed in further treatment to burn in combination with gasoline in gasoline engines.

=== Dehydration ===
There are three dehydration processes to remove the water from an azeotropic ethanol/water mixture. The first process, used in many early fuel ethanol plants, is called azeotropic distillation and consists of adding benzene or cyclohexane to the mixture. When these components are added to the mixture, it forms a heterogeneous azeotropic mixture in vapor–liquid-liquid equilibrium, which when distilled produces anhydrous ethanol in the column bottom, and a vapor mixture of water, ethanol, and cyclohexane/benzene.

When condensed, this becomes a two-phase liquid mixture. The heavier phase, poor in the entrainer (benzene or cyclohexane), is stripped of the entrainer and recycled to the feed—while the lighter phase, with condensate from the stripping, is recycled to the second column. Another early method, called extractive distillation, consists of adding a ternary component that increases ethanol's relative volatility. When the ternary mixture is distilled, it produces anhydrous ethanol on the top stream of the column.

With increasing attention being paid to saving energy, many methods have been proposed that avoid distillation altogether for dehydration. Of these methods, a third method has emerged and has been adopted by the majority of modern ethanol plants. This new process uses molecular sieves to remove water from fuel ethanol. In this process, ethanol vapor under pressure passes through a bed of molecular sieve beads. The bead's pores are sized to allow adsorption of water while excluding ethanol. After a period of time, the bed is regenerated under vacuum or in the flow of inert atmosphere (e.g. N_{2}) to remove the adsorbed water. Two beds are often used so that one is available to adsorb water while the other is being regenerated. This dehydration technology can account for energy saving of 3,000 btus/gallon (840 kJ/L) compared to earlier azeotropic distillation.

Recent research has demonstrated that complete dehydration prior to blending with gasoline is not always necessary. Instead, the azeotropic mixture can be blended directly with gasoline so that liquid-liquid phase equilibrium can assist in the elimination of water. A two-stage counter-current setup of mixer-settler tanks can achieve complete recovery of ethanol into the fuel phase, with minimal energy consumption.

=== Post-production water issues ===
Ethanol is hygroscopic, meaning it absorbs water vapor directly from the atmosphere. Because absorbed water dilutes the fuel value of the ethanol and may cause phase separation of ethanol-gasoline blends (which causes engine stall), containers of ethanol fuels must be kept tightly sealed. This high miscibility with water means that ethanol cannot be efficiently shipped through modern pipelines, like liquid hydrocarbons, over long distances.

The fraction of water that an ethanol-gasoline fuel can contain without phase separation increases with the percentage of ethanol. For example, E30 can have up to about 2% water. If there is more than about 71% ethanol, the remainder can be any proportion of water or gasoline and phase separation does not occur. The fuel mileage declines with increased water content. The increased solubility of water with higher ethanol content permits E30 and hydrated ethanol to be put in the same tank since any combination of them always results in a single phase. Somewhat less water is tolerated at lower temperatures. For E10 it is about 0.5% v/v at 21 °C and decreases to about 0.23% v/v at −34 °C.

=== Consumer production systems ===
While biodiesel production systems have been marketed to home and business users for many years, commercialized ethanol production systems designed for end-consumer use have lagged in the marketplace. In 2008, two different companies announced home-scale ethanol production systems. The AFS125 Advanced Fuel System from Allard Research and Development is capable of producing both ethanol and biodiesel in one machine, while the E-100 MicroFueler from E-Fuel Corporation is dedicated to ethanol only.

== Engines ==
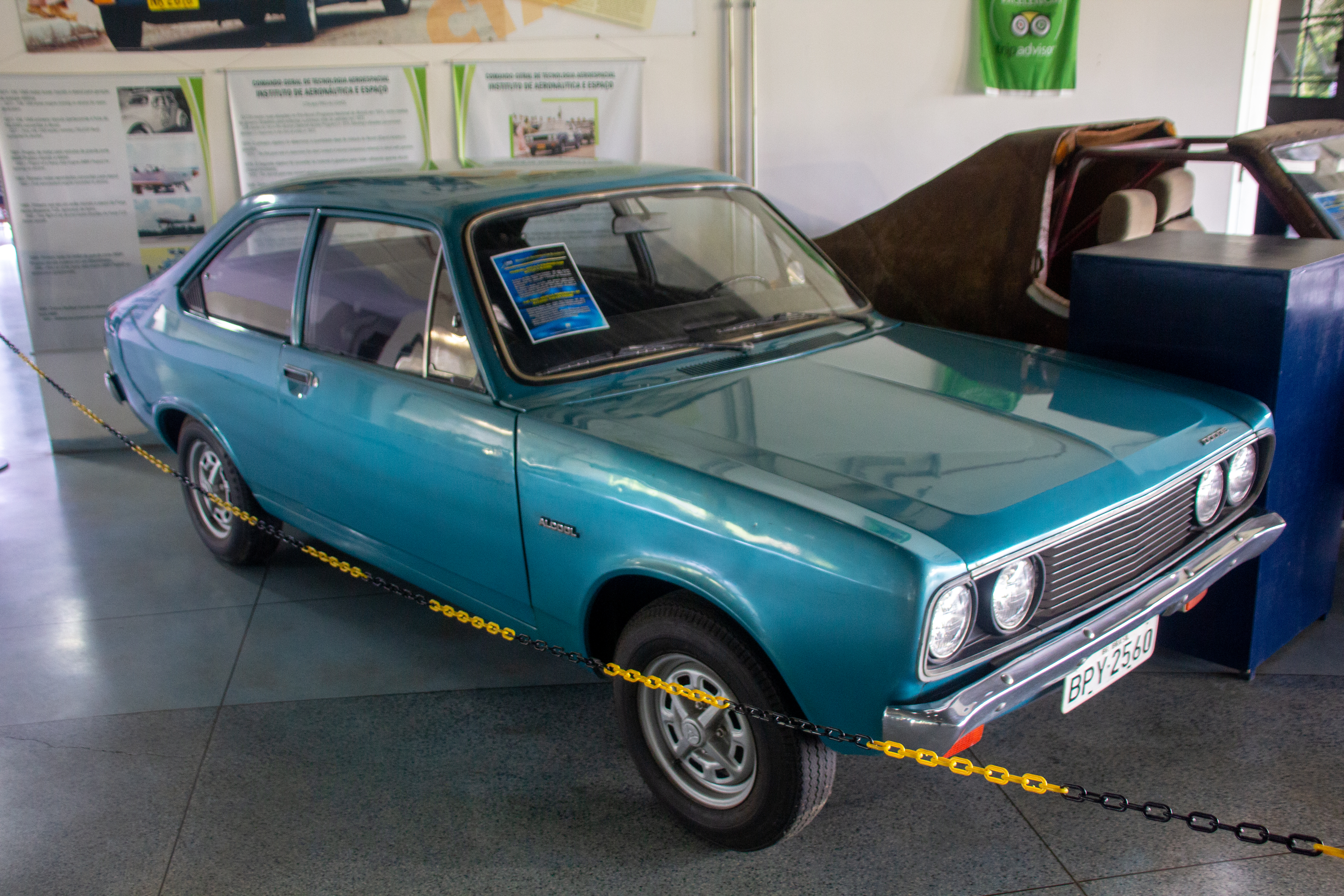
The first ethanol powered car, a Chrysler Dodge 1800, at Brazilian Aerospace Memorial

=== Efficiency ===
In the United States, ethanol fuel has a "gasoline gallon equivalency" (GGE) value of about 1.5, i.e. to replace the energy of 1 volume of gasoline, 1.5 times the volume of ethanol is needed. Although ethanol is usually less expensive than gasoline, ethanol in GGE is rarely cheaper than gasoline as the ethanol price is multiplied by 1.5.

=== Fuel economy ===
Ethanol contains approximately 34% less energy per unit volume than gasoline, and therefore in theory, burning pure ethanol in a vehicle reduces range per unit measure by 34%, given the same fuel economy, compared to burning pure gasoline. However, since ethanol has a higher octane rating, the engine can be made more efficient by raising its compression ratio.

For E10 (10% ethanol and 90% gasoline), the increase in fuel consumption in unmodified vehicles is small (up to 2.8%) when compared to conventional gasoline, and even smaller (1–2%) when compared to oxygenated and reformulated blends. For E85 (85% ethanol), the effect becomes significant. E85 produces lower mileage than gasoline, and requires more frequent refueling. Actual performance may vary depending on the vehicle. Based on EPA tests for all 2006 E85 models, the average fuel economy for E85 vehicles was 25.56% lower than unleaded gasoline. The EPA-rated mileage of current United States flex-fuel vehicles should be considered when making price comparisons, but E85 is a high performance fuel, with an octane rating of about 94–96, and should be compared to premium. Ethanol is not suitable for most aircraft, according to the RACQ, as well as some motorbikes and small engines, though the Embraer EMB 202 Ipanema is an example of an aircraft that has been specifically designed for use with ethanol fuel in some variants.

=== Cold start during the winter ===
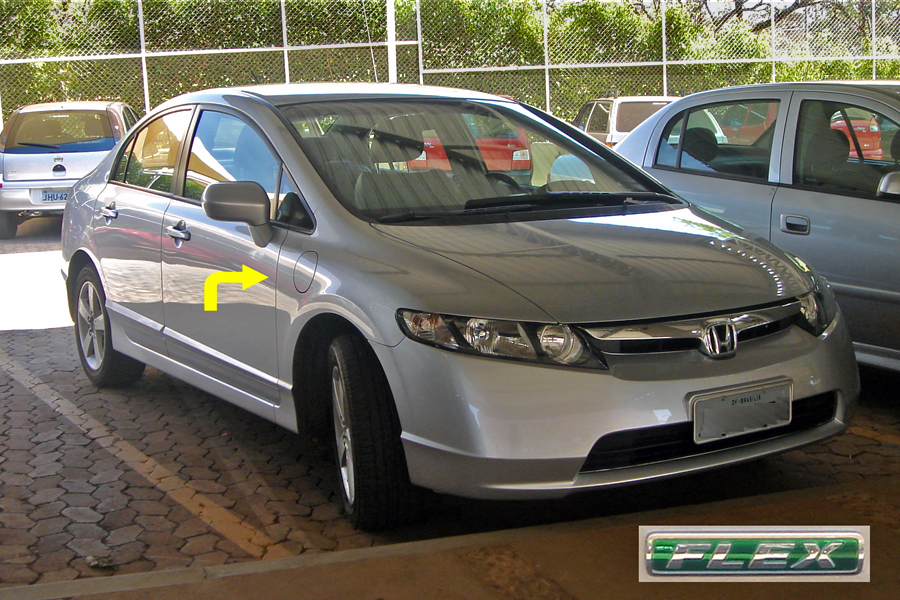
The Brazilian 2008 Honda Civic flex-fuel has outside direct access to the secondary reservoir gasoline tank in the front right side; the corresponding fuel filler door is shown by the arrow.

High ethanol blends present a problem to achieve enough vapor pressure for the fuel to evaporate and spark the ignition during cold weather (since ethanol tends to increase fuel enthalpy of vaporization). When vapor pressure is below 45 kPa starting a cold engine becomes difficult. To avoid this problem at temperatures below 11 °C (52 °F), and to reduce ethanol higher emissions during cold weather, both the US and the European markets adopted E85 as the maximum blend to be used in their flexible fuel vehicles, and they are optimized to run at such a blend. At places with harsh cold weather, the ethanol blend in the US has a seasonal reduction to E70 for these very cold regions, though it is still sold as E85. At places where temperatures fall below −12 °C (10 °F) during the winter, it is recommended to install an engine heater system, both for gasoline and E85 vehicles. Sweden has a similar seasonal reduction, but the ethanol content in the blend is reduced to E75 during the winter months.

Brazilian flex fuel vehicles can operate with ethanol mixtures up to E100, which is hydrous ethanol (with up to 4% water), which causes vapor pressure to drop faster as compared to E85 vehicles. As a result, Brazilian flex vehicles are built with a small secondary gasoline reservoir located near the engine. During a cold start pure gasoline is injected to avoid starting problems at low temperatures. This provision is particularly necessary for users of Brazil's southern and central regions, where temperatures normally drop below 15 °C (59 °F) during the winter. An improved flex engine generation was launched in 2009 that eliminates the need for the secondary gas storage tank. In March 2009 Volkswagen do Brasil launched the Polo E-Flex, the first Brazilian flex fuel model without an auxiliary tank for cold start.

=== Fuel mixtures ===
Hydrated ethanol × gasoline type C price table for use in Brazil

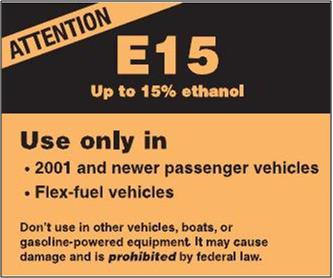
EPA's E15 label required to be displayed in all E15 fuel dispensers in the U.S.

In many countries cars are mandated to run on mixtures of ethanol. All Brazilian light-duty vehicles are built to operate for an ethanol blend of up to 25% (E25), and since 1993 a federal law requires mixtures between 22% and 25% ethanol, with 25% required as of mid July 2011. In the United States all light-duty vehicles are built to operate normally with an ethanol blend of 10% (E10). At the end of 2010 over 90 percent of all gasoline sold in the U.S. was blended with ethanol. In January 2011 the U.S. Environmental Protection Agency (EPA) issued a waiver to authorize up to 15% of ethanol blended with gasoline (E15) to be sold only for cars and light pickup trucks with a model year of 2001 or newer.

Beginning with the model year 1999, an increasing number of vehicles in the world are manufactured with engines that can run on any fuel from 0% ethanol up to 100% ethanol without modification. Many cars and light trucks (a class containing minivans, SUVs and pickup trucks) are designed to be flexible-fuel vehicles using ethanol blends up to 85% (E85) in North America and Europe, and up to 100% (E100) in Brazil. In older model years, their engine systems contained alcohol sensors in the fuel and/or oxygen sensors in the exhaust that provide input to the engine control computer to adjust the fuel injection to achieve stochiometric (no residual fuel or free oxygen in the exhaust) air-to-fuel ratio for any fuel mix. In newer models, the alcohol sensors have been removed, with the computer using only oxygen and airflow sensor feedback to estimate alcohol content. The engine control computer can also adjust (advance) the ignition timing to achieve a higher output without pre-ignition when it predicts that higher alcohol percentages are present in the fuel being burned. This method is backed up by advanced knock sensors – used in most high performance gasoline engines regardless of whether they are designed to use ethanol or not – that detect pre-ignition and detonation.

In June 2021, India brought forward to 2025 its target to implement a 20% ethanol-blended auto fuel. India's ethanol blending rate in fuel (at the time of this target revision) is 8%, which is set to increase to 10% by 2022 based on the 'Roadmap for ethanol blending in India 2020-25' released on 5 June (World Environment Day) by Prime Minister Narendra Modi. The government expects oil marketing companies such as Indian Oil Corp (IOC) and Hindustan Petroleum Corp Ltd (HPCL) to provide 20% ethanol-blended fuel from April 2023 onward. States like Maharashtra and Uttar Pradesh, where ethanol is in surplus, are expected to be the first to adopt the higher ethanol fuel blending rate. India is also prioritizing roll-out of vehicles compatible with ethanol-blended fuel. From March 2021, auto manufacturers are required to indicate the ethanol compatibility of new vehicles and engines must be optimally designed to use 20% ethanol-blended fuel. The government expects automakers to begin production of ethanol-blended fuel compliant vehicles before April 2022. However, environmentalists worry that India's increased target for ethanol blending could incentivise water-intensive crops such as sugarcane and rice, and suggest that the government should focus on lower-water intensity crops such as millets since India is already facing an acute water shortage.

=== Other engine configurations ===
ED95 engines

Since 1989 there have also been ethanol engines based on the diesel principle operating in Sweden. They are used primarily in city buses, but also in distribution trucks and waste collectors. The engines, made by Scania, have a modified compression ratio, and the fuel (known as ED95) used is a mix of 93.6% ethanol and 3.6% ignition improver, and 2.8% denaturants. The ignition improver makes it possible for the fuel to ignite in the diesel combustion cycle. It is then also possible to use the energy efficiency of the diesel principle with ethanol. These engines have been used in the United Kingdom by Reading Buses but the use of bioethanol fuel is now being phased out.

Dual-fuel direct-injection

A 2004 MIT study and an earlier paper published by the Society of Automotive Engineers identified a method to exploit the characteristics of fuel ethanol substantially more efficiently than mixing it with gasoline. The method presents the possibility of leveraging the use of alcohol to achieve definite improvement over the cost-effectiveness of hybrid electric. The improvement consists of using dual-fuel direct-injection of pure alcohol (or the azeotrope or E85) and gasoline, in any ratio up to 100% of either, in a turbocharged, high compression-ratio, small-displacement engine having performance similar to an engine having twice the displacement. Each fuel is carried separately, with a much smaller tank for alcohol. The high-compression (for higher efficiency) engine runs on ordinary gasoline under low-power cruise conditions. Alcohol is directly injected into the cylinders (and the gasoline injection simultaneously reduced) only when necessary to suppress 'knock' such as when significantly accelerating. Direct cylinder injection raises the already high octane rating of ethanol up to an effective 130. The calculated over-all reduction of gasoline use and CO_{2} emission is 30%. The consumer cost payback time shows a 4:1 improvement over turbo-diesel and a 5:1 improvement over hybrid. The problems of water absorption into pre-mixed gasoline (causing phase separation), supply issues of multiple mix ratios and cold-weather starting are also avoided.

Increased thermal efficiency

In a 2008 study, complex engine controls and increased exhaust gas recirculation allowed a compression ratio of 19.5 with fuels ranging from neat ethanol to E50. Thermal efficiency up to approximately that for a diesel was achieved. This would result in the fuel economy of a neat ethanol vehicle to be about the same as one burning gasoline.

Fuel cells powered by an ethanol reformer

In June 2016, Nissan announced plans to develop fuel cell vehicles powered by ethanol rather than hydrogen, the fuel of choice by the other car manufacturers that have developed and commercialized fuel cell vehicles, such as the Hyundai Tucson FCEV, Toyota Mirai, and Honda FCX Clarity. The main advantage of this technical approach is that it would be cheaper and easier to deploy the fueling infrastructure than setting up the one required to deliver hydrogen at high pressures, as each hydrogen fueling station cost US$1 million to US$2 million to build.

Nissan plans to create a technology that uses liquid ethanol fuel as a source to generate hydrogen within the vehicle itself. The technology uses heat to reform ethanol into hydrogen to feed what is known as a solid oxide fuel cell (SOFC). The fuel cell generates electricity to supply power to the electric motor driving the wheels, through a battery that handles peak power demands and stores regenerated energy. The vehicle would include a tank for a blend of water and ethanol, which is fed into an onboard reformer that splits it into pure hydrogen and carbon dioxide. According to Nissan, the liquid fuel could be an ethanol-water blend at a 55:45 ratio. Nissan expects to commercialize its technology by 2020.

== Production by country ==
The world's top ethanol fuel producers in 2011 were the United States with 13.9×10^{9} U.S. gallons (5.3×10^{10} liters; 1.16×10^{10} imperial gallons) and Brazil with 5.6×10^{9} U.S. gallons (2.1×10^{10} liters; 4.7×10^{9} imperial gallons), accounting together for 87.1% of world production of 22.36×10^{9} U.S. gallons (8.46×10^{10} liters; 1.862×10^{10} imperial gallons). Strong incentives, coupled with other industry development initiatives, are giving rise to fledgling ethanol industries in countries such as Germany, Spain, France, Sweden, China, Thailand, Canada, Colombia, India, Australia, and some Central American countries.

Annual fuel ethanol production by country (2007–2011) Top 10 countries/regional blocks (millions of U.S. liquid gallons per year)
World rank	Country/region	2011	2010	2009	2008	2007
1	United States	13,900.00	13,231.00	10,938.00	9,235.00	6,485.00
2	Brazil	5,573.24	6,921.54	6,577.89	6,472.20	5,019.20
3	EU	1,199.31	1,176.88	1,039.52	733.60	570.30
4	China	554.76	541.55	541.55	501.90	486.00
5	Thailand			435.20	89.80	79.20
6	Canada	462.30	356.63	290.59	237.70	211.30
7	India			91.67	66.00	52.80
8	Colombia			83.21	79.30	74.90
9	Australia	87.20	66.04	56.80	26.40	26.40
10	Other			247.27		
	World Total	22,356.09	22,946.87	19,534.99	17,335.20	13,101.70

=== Brazilian ethanol fuel program ===
Since the 1970s, Brazil has had an ethanol fuel program which has allowed the country to become the world's second largest producer of ethanol (after the United States) and the world's largest exporter. Brazil's ethanol fuel program uses modern equipment and cheap sugarcane as feedstock, and the residual cane-waste (bagasse) is used to produce heat and power. There are no longer light vehicles in Brazil running on pure gasoline.

== Environment ==
=== Energy balance ===
Energy balance
Country	Type	Energy balance
United States	Corn ethanol	1.3
Germany	Biodiesel	2.5
Brazil	Sugarcane ethanol	8
United States	Cellulosic ethanol^{†}	2–36^{††}

† experimental, not in commercial production

†† depending on production method

All biomass goes through at least some of these steps: it needs to be grown, collected, dried, fermented, distilled, and burned. All of these steps require resources and an infrastructure. The total amount of energy input into the process compared to the energy released by burning the resulting ethanol fuel is known as the energy balance (or "energy returned on energy invested"). Figures compiled in a 2007 report by National Geographic point to modest results for corn ethanol produced in the US: one unit of fossil-fuel energy is required to create 1.3 energy units from the resulting ethanol. The energy balance for sugarcane ethanol produced in Brazil is more favorable, with one unit of fossil-fuel energy required to create 8 from the ethanol. Energy balance estimates are not easily produced, thus numerous such reports have been generated that are contradictory. For instance, a separate survey reports that production of ethanol from sugarcane, which requires a tropical climate to grow productively, returns from 8 to 9 units of energy for each unit expended, as compared to corn, which only returns about 1.34 units of fuel energy for each unit of energy expended. Producing ethanol from corn uses much less petroleum than producing gasoline.

Carbon dioxide, a greenhouse gas, is emitted during fermentation and combustion. This is canceled out by the greater uptake of carbon dioxide by the plants as they grow to produce the biomass. When produced by certain methods, ethanol releases less greenhouse gases than gasoline does.

=== Air pollution ===
Compared with conventional unleaded gasoline, ethanol is a particulate-free burning fuel source that combusts with oxygen to form carbon dioxide, carbon monoxide, water and acetaldehyde. The Clean Air Act requires the addition of oxygenates to reduce carbon monoxide emissions in the United States. The additive MTBE is currently being phased out due to ground water contamination, hence ethanol becomes an attractive alternative additive. Current production methods include air pollution from the manufacturer of macronutrient fertilizers such as ammonia.

E85 fuel is predicted to increase the risk of air pollution deaths relative to gasoline by 9% in Los Angeles, US: a very large, urban, car-based metropolis that is a worst-case scenario. Ozone levels are significantly increased, thereby increasing photochemical smog and aggravating medical problems such as asthma.

Brazil burns significant amounts of ethanol biofuel. Gas chromatograph studies were performed of ambient air in São Paulo, Brazil, and compared to Osaka, Japan, which does not burn ethanol fuel. Atmospheric Formaldehyde was 160% higher in Brazil, and Acetaldehyde was 260% higher.

=== Carbon dioxide ===
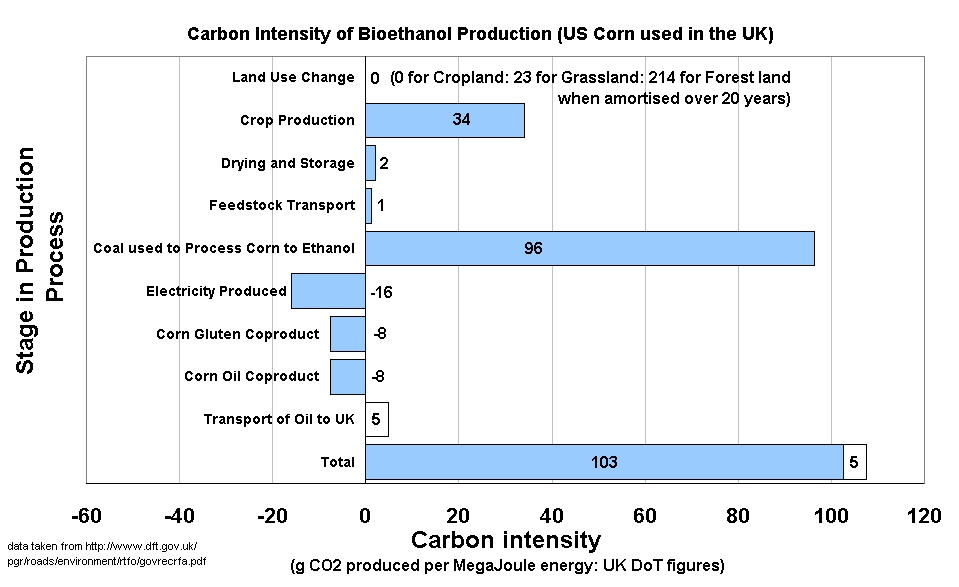
UK government calculation of carbon intensity of corn bioethanol grown in the US and burnt in the UK

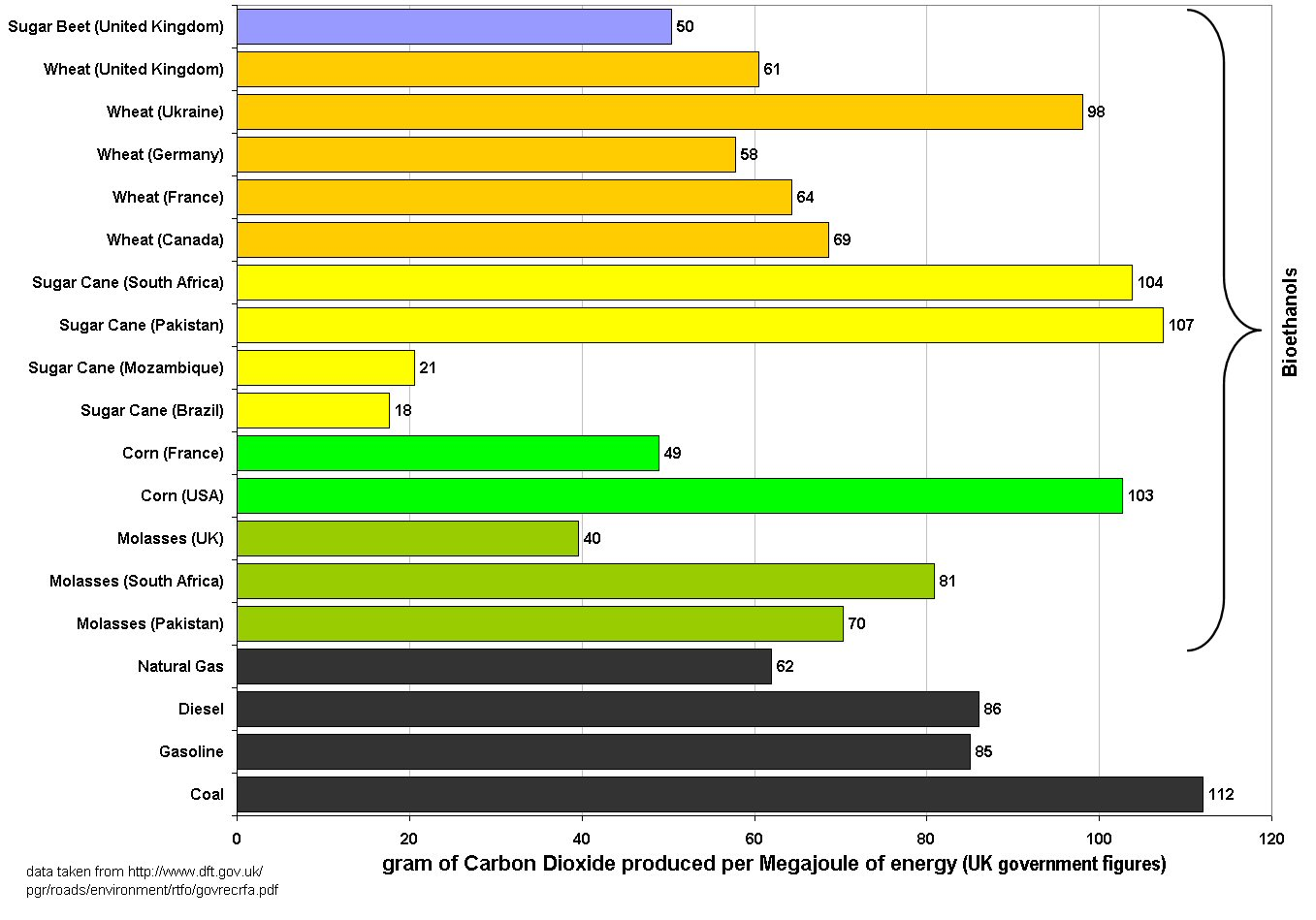
Graph of UK figures for the carbon intensity of bioethanol and fossil fuels. This graph assumes that all bioethanols are burnt in their country of origin and that previously existing cropland is used to grow the feedstock.

The calculation of exactly how much carbon dioxide is produced in the manufacture of bioethanol is a complex and inexact process, and is highly dependent on the method by which the ethanol is produced and the assumptions made in the calculation. A calculation should include:

- The cost of growing the feedstock
- The cost of transporting the feedstock to the factory
- The cost of processing the feedstock into bioethanol

Such a calculation may or may not consider the following effects:

- The cost of the change in land use of the area where the fuel feedstock is grown.
- The cost of transportation of the bioethanol from the factory to its point of use
- The efficiency of the bioethanol compared with standard gasoline
- The amount of carbon dioxide produced at the tail pipe.
- The benefits due to the production of useful bi-products, such as cattle feed or electricity.

The graph on the right shows figures calculated by the UK government for the purposes of the Renewable transport fuel obligation.

The reduction from corn ethanol in GHG is estimated to be 7.4%. A National Geographic overview article (2007) puts the figures at 22% less CO_{2} emissions in production and use for corn ethanol compared to gasoline and a 56% reduction for cane ethanol. Carmaker Ford reports a 70% reduction in CO_{2} emissions with bioethanol compared to petrol for one of their flexible-fuel vehicles.

An additional complication is that production requires tilling new soil which produces a one-off release of GHG that it can take decades or centuries of production reductions in GHG emissions to equalize. As an example, converting grass lands to corn production for ethanol takes about a century of annual savings to make up for the GHG released from the initial tilling.

=== Change in land use ===
Agricultural alcohol requires large-scale farming. According to one estimate, if all corn grown in the U.S. were used to make ethanol it would displace 12% of current U.S. gasoline consumption. There are claims that land for ethanol production is acquired through deforestation, while others have observed that areas currently supporting forests are usually not suitable for growing crops. In any case, farming may involve a decline in soil fertility due to reduction of organic matter, a decrease in water availability and quality, an increase in the use of pesticides and fertilizers, and potential dislocation of local communities. New technology enables farmers and processors to increasingly produce the same output using less inputs.

Cellulosic ethanol production is a new approach that may alleviate land use and related concerns. Cellulosic ethanol can be produced from any plant material, potentially doubling yields, in an effort to minimize conflict between food needs vs. fuel needs. Instead of utilizing only the starch by-products from grinding wheat and other crops, cellulosic ethanol production maximizes the use of all plant materials, including gluten. This approach would have a smaller carbon footprint because the amount of energy-intensive fertilisers and fungicides remain the same for higher output of usable material. The technology for producing cellulosic ethanol is currently in the commercialization stage.

==== Using biomass for electricity instead of ethanol ====
Converting biomass to electricity for charging electric vehicles may be a more "climate-friendly" transportation option than using biomass to produce ethanol fuel, according to an analysis published in Science in May 2009. Researchers continue to search for more cost-effective developments in both cellulosic ethanol and advanced vehicle batteries.

==== Health costs of ethanol emissions ====
For each billion ethanol-equivalent gallons of fuel produced and combusted in the US, the combined climate-change and health costs are $469 million for gasoline, $472–952 million for corn ethanol depending on biorefinery heat source (natural gas, corn stover, or coal) and technology, but only $123–208 million for cellulosic ethanol depending on feedstock (prairie biomass, Miscanthus, corn stover, or switchgrass).

== Efficiency of common crops ==
As ethanol yields improve or different feedstocks are introduced, ethanol production may become more economically feasible in the US. Currently, research on improving ethanol yields from each unit of corn is underway using biotechnology. Also, as long as oil prices remain high, the economical use of other feedstocks, such as cellulose, becomes viable. By-products such as straw or wood chips can be converted to ethanol. Fast growing species like switchgrass can be grown on land not suitable for other cash crops and yield high levels of ethanol per unit area.

Crop	Annual yield (liters/hectare, US gal/acre)	Greenhouse-gas savings vs. petrol[a]	Cold hardiness zone limit	Hot hardiness zone limit	Comments
Sugar cane	6800–8000 L/ha, 727–870 gal/acre	87%–96%	9	13	Long-season annual grass. Used as feedstock for most bioethanol produced in Brazil. Newer processing plants burn residues not used for ethanol to generate electricity. Grows only in tropical and subtropical climates.
Miscanthus	7300 L/ha, 780 gal/acre	37%–73%	5	9	Low-input perennial grass. Ethanol production depends on development of cellulosic technology.
Switchgrass	3100–7600 L/ha, 330–810 gal/acre	37%–73%	5	9	Low-input perennial grass. Ethanol production depends on development of cellulosic technology. Breeding efforts underway to increase yields. Higher biomass production is possible with mixed species of perennial grasses.
Poplar	3700–6000 L/ha, 400–640 gal/acre	51%–100%	3	9	Fast-growing tree. Ethanol production depends on development of cellulosic technology. Completion of genomic sequencing project will aid breeding efforts to increase yields.
Sweet sorghum	2500–7000 L/ha, 270–750 gal/acre	No data	9	12	Low-input annual grass. Ethanol production possible using existing technology. Grows in tropical and temperate climates, but highest ethanol yield estimates assume multiple crops per year (possible only in tropical climates). Does not store well.
Corn	3100–4000 L/ha, 330–424 gal/acre	10%–20%	4	8	High-input annual grass. Used as feedstock for most bioethanol produced in US. Only kernels can be processed using available technology; development of commercial cellulosic technology would allow stover to be used and increase ethanol yield by 1,100 – 2,000 litres/ha.
Sugar beet	6678-8419 L/ha, 714-900 gal/acre	No data	2	10	Grown as ethanol crop in France.
Cassava	3835 L/ha, 410 gal/acre	No data	10	13	Grown as ethanol crop in Nigeria.
Wheat	2591 L/ha, 277 gal/acre	No data	3	12	Grown as ethanol crop in France.
Source (except those indicated): Nature 444 (7 December 2006): 673–676. [a] – Savings of GHG emissions assuming no land use change (using existing crop lands).

== Reduced petroleum imports and costs ==
One rationale given for extensive ethanol production in the U.S. is its benefit to energy security, by shifting the need for some foreign-produced oil to domestically produced energy sources. Production of ethanol requires significant energy, but current U.S. production derives most of that energy from coal, natural gas and other sources, rather than oil. Because 66% of oil consumed in the U.S. is imported, compared to a net surplus of coal and just 16% of natural gas (figures from 2006), the displacement of oil-based fuels to ethanol produces a net shift from foreign to domestic U.S. energy sources.

US ethanol production has caused retail gasoline prices to be US$0.29 to US$0.40 per gallon lower than would otherwise have been the case (2008 data).

== Applications and projects ==
=== Motorsport ===
Ethanol fuel has played an increasing role in motorsport.

- Leon Duray qualified third for the 1927 Indianapolis 500 auto race with an ethanol-fueled car. The IndyCar Series adopted a 10% ethanol blend for the 2006 season, and a 98% blend in 2007.
- The American Le Mans Series sports car championship introduced E10 in the 2007 season to replace pure gasoline. In the 2008 season, E85 was allowed in the GT class and teams began switching to it.
- In 2011, the three national NASCAR stock car series mandated a switch from gasoline to E15, a blend of Sunoco GTX unleaded racing fuel and 15% ethanol.

Australia's V8 Supercar championship uses Shell E85 for its racing fuel, and Stock Car Brasil Championship runs on neat ethanol, E100. Ethanol fuel may also be utilized as a rocket fuel. As of 2010, small quantities of ethanol are used in lightweight rocket-racing aircraft.

=== Alternative cooking fuel ===
Project Gaia is a U.S. non-governmental, non-profit organization involved in the creation of a commercially viable household market for alcohol-based fuels in Ethiopia and other countries in the developing world. The project considers alcohol fuels to be a solution to fuel shortages, environmental damage, and public health issues caused by traditional cooking in the developing world. Targeting poor and marginalized communities that face health issues from cooking over polluting fires, Gaia currently works in Ethiopia, Nigeria, Brazil, Haiti, and Madagascar, and is in the planning stage of projects in several other countries.

== Research ==
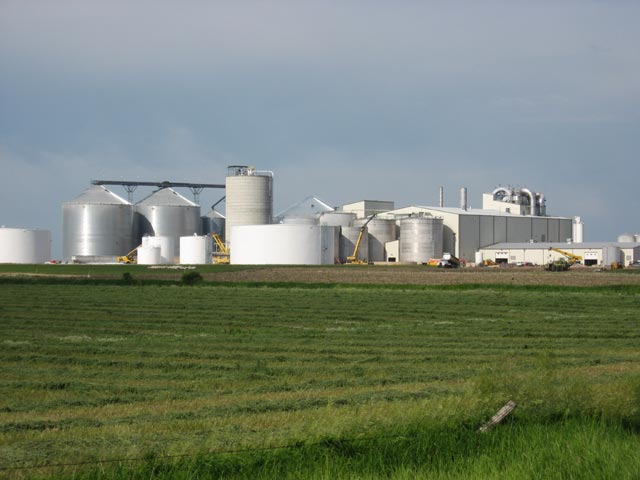
Ethanol plant in Turner County, South Dakota

Ethanol research focuses on alternative sources, novel catalysts and production processes. Ineos produced ethanol from vegetative material and wood waste. The bacterium E.coli when genetically engineered with cow rumen genes and enzymes can produce ethanol from corn stover. Other potential feedstocks are municipal waste, recycled products, rice hulls, sugarcane bagasse, wood chips, switchgrass and carbon dioxide.

== Bibliography ==
- J. Goettemoeller; A. Goettemoeller (2007). Sustainable Ethanol: Biofuels, Biorefineries, Cellulosic Biomass, Flex-Fuel Vehicles, and Sustainable Farming for Energy Independence (Brief and comprehensive account of the history, evolution and future of ethanol). Prairie Oak Publishing, Maryville, Missouri. ISBN 978-0-9786293-0-4.
- Onuki, Shinnosuke; Koziel, Jacek A.; van Leeuwen, Johannes; Jenks, William S.; Grewell, David; Cai, Lingshuang (June 2008). Ethanol production, purification, and analysis techniques: a review. 2008 ASABE Annual International Meeting. Providence, Rhode Island.
- The Worldwatch Institute (2007). Biofuels for Transport: Global Potential and Implications for Energy and Agriculture (Global view, includes country study cases of Brazil, China, India and Tanzania). London, UK: Earthscan Publications. ISBN 978-1-84407-422-8.

== See also ==
- Alcohol fuel
- Biobutanol, a gasoline replacement
- Bioconversion of biomass to mixed alcohol fuels
- Biodiesel
- Biomass
- Cellulosic ethanol
- Common ethanol fuel mixtures
- Corn ethanol
- DMF (potential ethanol competitor biofuel)
- Dimethyl ether
- Energy crop
- Ethanol effect
- Ethanol from coal
- Flexible-fuel vehicle
- Food vs. fuel
- Gasoline gallon equivalent
- Hydrogen fuel
- Issues relating to biofuels
- Liquid fuels
- Low-carbon fuel standard
- Methanol economy
- Methanol fuel
- P-series fuels
- Renewable energy
- Timeline of alcohol fuel
- United States energy law
