= Salt-effect distillation =

Salt-effect distillation is a method of extractive distillation in which a salt is dissolved in the mixture of liquids to be distilled. The salt acts as a separating agent by raising the relative volatility of the mixture and by breaking any azeotropes that may otherwise form. The technique is first attested in writings on alcohol attributed to Jabir ibn Hayyan (9th c. CE).

== Setup ==
The salt is fed into the distillation column at a steady rate by adding it to the reflux stream at the top of the column. It dissolves in the liquid phase, and since it is non-volatile, flows out with the heavier bottoms stream. The bottoms are partially or completely evaporated to recover the salt for reuse.

== Usage ==
Extractive distillation is more costly than ordinary fractional distillation due to costs associated with the recovery of the separating agent. One advantage of salt-effect distillation over other types of azeotropic distillation is the potential for reduced costs associated with energy usage. In addition, the salt ions have a greater effect on the volatility of the mixture to be distilled than other liquid-separating agents. Commercial usage of salt-effect distillation includes adding magnesium nitrate to an aqueous solution of nitric acid to concentrate it further. Calcium chloride is added to acetone-methanol and water-isopropanol mixtures in order to facilitate separation.

== See also ==
- Distillation
- Extractive distillation
- Azeotrope
- Salting out
