= Dean–Stark apparatus =

Chemical lab apparatus for collecting water from a reactor

Dean–Stark apparatus setup for an azeotrope with a solvent whose density is less than that of water: 1. Stirrer bar/anti-bumping granules; 2. Still pot; 3. Fractionating column; 4. Thermometer/Boiling point temperature; 5. Condenser; 6. Cooling water in; 7. Cooling water out; 8. Burette; 9. Tap; 10. Collection vessel

The Marcusson apparatus, Dean-Stark apparatus, Dean–Stark receiver, distilling trap, or Dean–Stark Head is a piece of laboratory glassware used in synthetic chemistry to collect water (or occasionally other liquid) from a reactor. It is used in combination with a reflux condenser and a distillation flask for the separation of water from liquids. This may be a continuous removal of the water that is produced during a chemical reaction performed at reflux temperature, such as in esterification reactions. The original setup by Julius Marcusson (invented in 1905) was refined by the American chemists Ernest Woodward Dean (1888–1959) and David Dewey Stark (1893–1979) in 1920 for determination of the water content in petroleum.

== Function ==
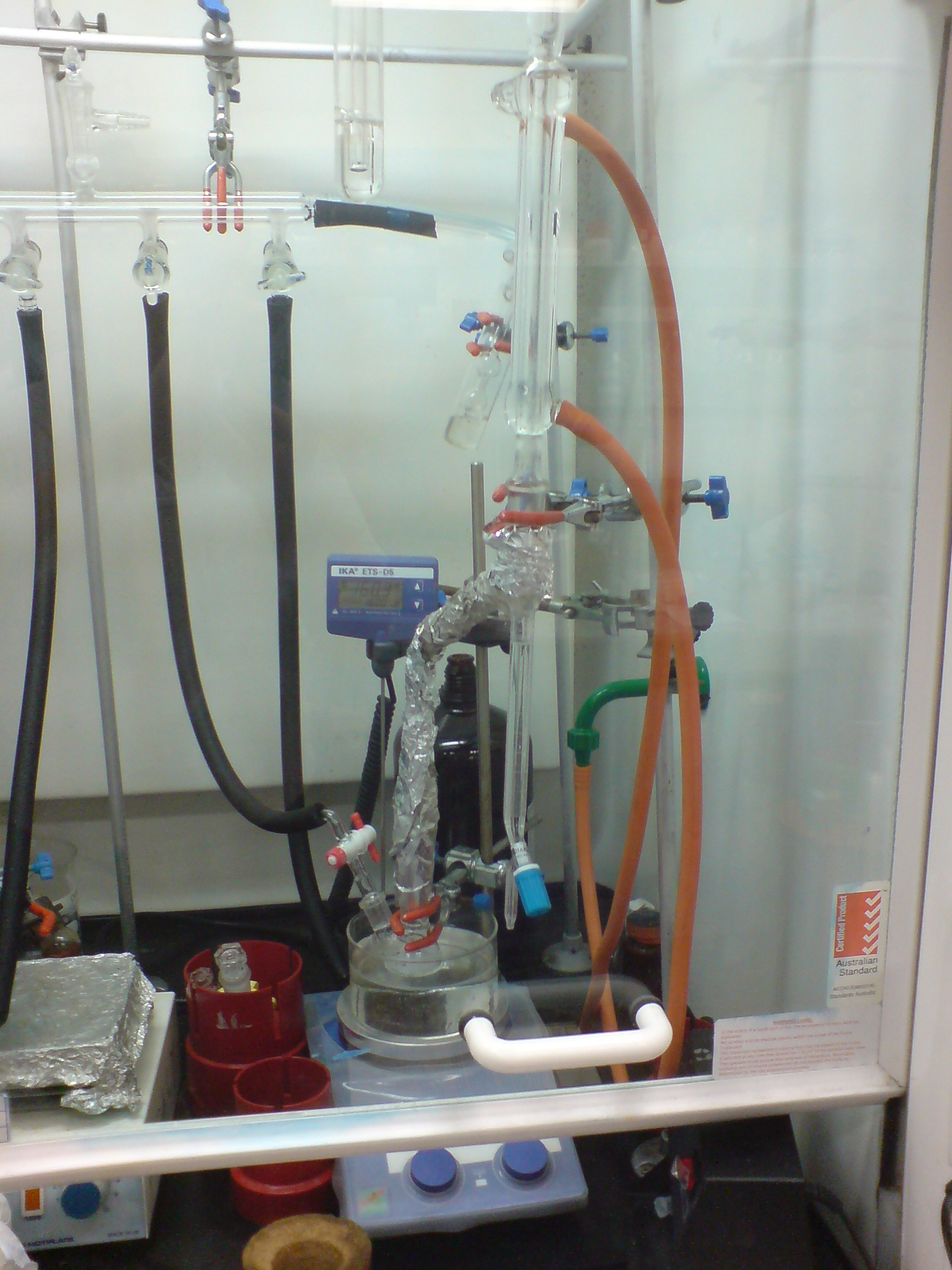
A Dean–Stark apparatus in use; aluminium foil is used to reduce heat losses

Two types of Dean–Stark traps exist – one for use with solvents with a density less than that of water and another for use with solvents with a density greater than that of water.

The Dean–Stark apparatus typically consists of a vertical cylindrical glass tube, often with a volumetric graduation along its full length and a precision stopcock at its lower end, very much like a burette. Traps designed to remove or measure very small amounts of water may be closed, with no tap. The lower end of a reflux condenser fits into the top of the cylinder. Immediately below the joint between the condenser and the cylinder is a sloping side-arm that joins the cylinder to a reaction flask. The lower end of the side-arm turns sharply downward, so that the side-arm is connected to the reaction flask by a vertical tube.

The reaction flask is heated. Boiling chips within it assist with the calm formation of bubbles of vapor containing the reaction solvent and the component to be removed. This vapor travels out of reaction flask up into the condenser where water being circulated around it causes it to cool and drip into the distilling trap. Here, the immiscible liquids separate into layers (water below and solvent above it). When their combined volume reaches the level of the side-arm, the upper, less-dense layer will begin to flow back to the reactor while the water layer will remain in the trap. The trap will eventually reach capacity when the level of the water in it reaches the level of the side-arm. At this point, the trap must be drained into the receiving flask. The process of evaporation, condensation and collection may be continued until it ceases to produce additional amounts of water.

More rarely encountered is the model for solvents with a density greater than water. This type has a tube at the bottom of the collection vessel to allow the organic solvent at the bottom to flow back into the reaction vessel. The water generated during the reaction floats on top of the organic phase. The entire volume must be drained to remove the water and the organic layer can be separated to be returned to the system.

This piece of equipment is usually used in azeotropic distillations. A common example is the removal of water generated during a reaction in boiling toluene. An azeotropic mixture of toluene and water distills out of the reaction, but only the toluene (density 0.865 g/ml) returns, since it floats on top of the water (density 0.998 g/ml), which collects in the trap. Some high-boiling liquids that have an azeotrope with water can be dried by adding toluene or another azeotrope-breaking solvent to allow the extraction of water. The Dean–Stark method is commonly used to measure moisture content of items such as bread in the food industry.

This equipment can be used in cases other than simple removal of water. One example is the esterification of butanol with acetic acid catalyzed by sulfuric acid. The vapor contains 63% ester, 29% water and 8% alcohol at reflux temperature and the organic layer in the trap contains 86% ester, 11% alcohol and 3% water which is reintroduced. The water layer is 97% pure.

Another example is the esterification of benzoic acid and n-butanol where the ester product is trapped and the butanol, immiscible with the water, flows back into the reactor. Removing water in the course of these esterifications shifts the chemical equilibrium in favor of ester formation, in accordance with Le Chatelier's principle.
