= Azeotropic distillation =

Any of a range of techniques used to break an azeotrope in distillation

Phase diagram (left) and process flow diagram (right) of an apparatus for the azeotropic distillation with "material separation agent". In this case the phase diagram includes a zone where components are not miscible, so following the condensation of the azeotrope, it is possible to separate the liquid components through decantation.

In chemistry, azeotropic distillation is any of a range of techniques used to break an azeotrope in distillation. In chemical engineering, azeotropic distillation is usually the specific technique of adding another component to generate a new, lower-boiling azeotrope that is heterogeneous (e.g. producing two, immiscible liquid phases), such as the example below with the addition of benzene to water and ethanol.

Common Equipment used in Azeotropic Distillation

This practice of adding an entrainer which forms a separate phase is a specific sub-set of (industrial) azeotropic distillation methods, or combination thereof. In some senses, adding an entrainer is similar to extractive distillation.

== Material separation agent ==
The addition of a material separation agent, such as benzene to an ethanol/water mixture, changes the molecular interactions and eliminates the azeotrope. Added in the liquid phase, the new component can alter the activity coefficient of various compounds in different ways thus altering a mixture's relative volatility. Greater deviations from Raoult's law make it easier to achieve significant changes in relative volatility with the addition of another component. In azeotropic distillation the volatility of the added component is the same as the mixture, and a new azeotrope is formed with one or more of the components based on differences in polarity. If the material separation agent is selected to form azeotropes with more than one component in the feed then it is referred to as an entrainer. The added entrainer should be recovered by distillation, decantation, or another separation method and returned near the top of the original column.

== Distillation of ethanol/water ==
A common historical example of azeotropic distillation is its use in dehydrating ethanol and water mixtures. For this, a near azeotropic mixture is sent to the final column where azeotropic distillation takes place. Several entrainers can be used for this specific process: benzene, pentane, cyclohexane, hexane, heptane, isooctane, acetone, and diethyl ether are all options as the mixture. Of these benzene and cyclohexane have been used the most extensively, but since the identification of benzene as a carcinogen, toluene is used instead.

A Dean–Stark apparatus is used in azeotropic drying or dehydration processes: 1 stirrer bar/anti-bumping granules, 2 still pot, 3 fractionating column, 4 thermometer/boiling point temperature, 5 condenser, 6 cooling water in, 7 cooling water out, 8 burette, 9 tap, 10 collection vessel

== Pressure-swing distillation ==
Another method, pressure-swing distillation, relies on the fact that an azeotrope is pressure dependent. An azeotrope is not a range of concentrations that cannot be distilled, but the point at which the activity coefficients of the distillates are crossing one another. If the azeotrope can be "jumped over", distillation can continue, although because the activity coefficients have crossed, the component which is boiling will change. For instance, in a distillation of ethanol and water, water will boil out of the remaining ethanol, rather than the ethanol out of the water as at lower concentrations.

Overall the pressure-swing distillation is a very robust and not so highly sophisticated method compared to multi component distillation or membrane processes, but the energy demand is in general higher. Also the investment cost of the distillation columns is higher, due to the pressure inside the vessels.

== Molecular sieves ==
For low boiling azeotropes distillation may not allow the components to be fully separated, and must make use of separation methods that does not rely on distillation. A common approach involves the use of molecular sieves. The sieves can be subsequently regenerated by dehydration using a vacuum oven.

Ethanol can be dried to 99.999% ABV by heating 3A molecular sieves such as 3A zeolite.

== Dehydration reactions ==
In organic chemistry, some dehydration reactions are subject to unfavorable but fast equilibria. One example is the formation of dioxolanes from aldehydes:

RCHO + (CH_{2}OH)_{2} $\rightleftharpoons$ RCH(OCH_{2})_{2} + H_{2}O

Such unfavorable reactions proceed when water is removed by azeotropic distillation.

== See also ==
- Azeotrope tables
- Residue curve
- Theoretical plate
- Vacuum distillation
