= Extractive distillation =

Process flow diagram showing an extractive distillation apparatus. In this case the mixture components A and B are separated in the first column through the solvent E (recovered in the second column).

Extractive distillation is defined as distillation in the presence of a miscible, high-boiling, relatively non-volatile component, the solvent, that forms no azeotrope with the other components in the mixture. The method is used for mixtures having a low value of relative volatility, nearing unity. Such mixtures cannot be separated by simple distillation, because the volatility of the two components in the mixture is nearly the same, causing them to evaporate at nearly the same temperature at a similar rate, making normal distillation impractical.

The method of extractive distillation uses a separation solvent, which is generally non-volatile, has a high boiling point and is miscible with the mixture, but doesn't form an azeotropic mixture. The solvent interacts differently with the components of the mixture thereby causing their relative volatilities to change. This enables the new three-part mixture to be separated by normal distillation. The original component with the greatest volatility separates out as the top product. The bottom product consists of a mixture of the solvent and the other component, which can again be separated easily because the solvent does not form an azeotrope with it. The bottom product can be separated by any of the methods available.

It is important to select a suitable separation solvent for this type of distillation. The solvent must alter the relative volatility by a wide enough margin for a successful result. The quantity, cost and availability of the solvent should be considered. The solvent should be easily separable from the bottom product, and should not react chemically with the components or the mixture, or cause corrosion in the equipment. A classic example to be cited here is the separation of an azeotropic mixture of benzene and cyclohexane, where aniline is one suitable solvent.

== See also ==
- Batch distillation
- Heteroazeotrope
- Theoretical plate
