= Ethanol from coal =

Ethanol produced from coalstock

Ethanol from coal is the ethanol produced using coal as its carbon source. The anaerobic bacterium Clostridium ljungdahlii produces ethanol and acetic acid from CO, CO_{2}, and H_{2} in synthesis gas. Early studies with C. ljungdahlii showed that relatively high concentrations of ethanol could be produced. This process involves three main steps:

1. Gasification: Thermal gasification at temperatures of up to 2,200°F in a reducing, very low oxygen atmosphere transforms organic materials into simple CO, CO_{2} and H_{2} gases.
2. Fermentation: The acetogenic C. ljungdahlii convert the carbon monoxide into ethanol.
3. Distillation: Ethanol is separated from hydrogen and water.

== Sources ==
- Green car
- Springerlink
- Resting cells
- Ethanol from coal advancing
