= Miscibility =

Ability of two substances to form a homogeneous solution when mixed

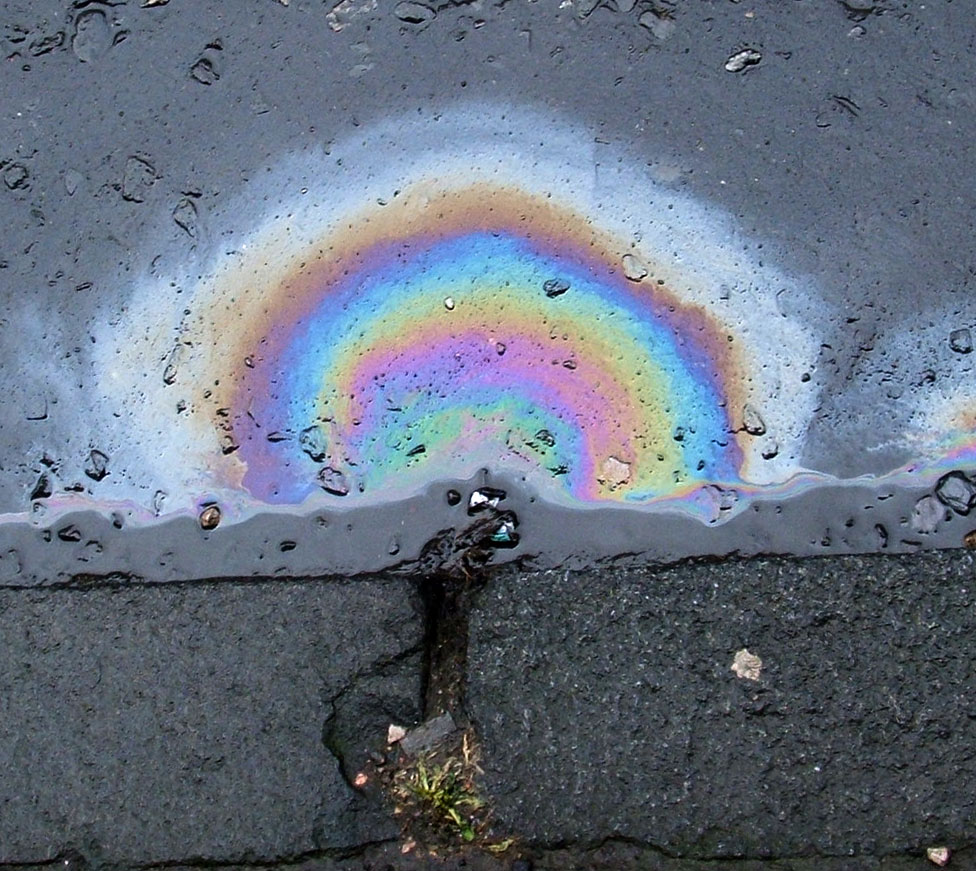
Diesel fuel is immiscible in water, the fuel instead remaining as a distinct layer. The bright rainbow pattern is the result of thin-film interference.

Miscibility (/ˌmɪsɪˈbɪlɪti/) is the property of two substances to mix in all proportions (that is, to fully dissolve in each other at any concentration), forming a homogeneous mixture (a solution). Such substances are said to be miscible (etymologically equivalent to the common term "mixable"). The term is most often applied to liquids, but also applies to solids and gases. An example in liquids is the miscibility of water and ethanol as they mix in all proportions.

By contrast, substances are said to be immiscible if the mixture does not form a solution for certain proportions. For one example, oil is not soluble in water, so these two solvents are immiscible. As another example, butanone (methyl ethyl ketone) is immiscible in water: it is soluble in water up to about 275 grams per liter, but will separate into two phases beyond that.

== Organic compounds ==
In organic compounds, the weight percent of hydrocarbon chain often determines the compound's miscibility with water. For example, among the alcohols, ethanol has two carbon atoms and is miscible with water, whereas 1-butanol with four carbons is not. 1-Octanol, with eight carbons, is practically insoluble in water, and its immiscibility leads it to be used as a standard for partition equilibria. The straight-chain carboxylic acids up to butanoic acid (with four carbon atoms) are miscible with water, pentanoic acid (with five carbons) is partly soluble, and hexanoic acid (with six) is practically insoluble, as are longer fatty acids and other lipids; the very long carbon chains of lipids cause them almost always to be immiscible with water. Analogous situations occur for other functional groups such as aldehydes and ketones.

Thus a practical rule of thumb for determining the solubility of an organic molecule in water (and/or other similarly polar solvents) is to consider the ratio of carbons in the molecule bound to polar functional groups (such as hydroxyl groups), to the number of simple hydrocarbons. If the molecule has a ratio of roughly 1:4 (Polar-to-non-polar carbons), it is soluble in water. It is however necessary to recognise this as a rule of thumb, and not always indicative.

== Metals ==
Immiscible metals are unable to form alloys with each other. Typically, a mixture will be possible in the molten state, but upon freezing, the metals separate into layers. This property allows solid precipitates to be formed by rapidly freezing a molten mixture of immiscible metals. One example of immiscibility in metals is copper and cobalt, where rapid freezing to form solid precipitates has been used to create granular GMR materials.

Some metals are immiscible in the liquid state. One example with industrial importance is that liquid zinc and liquid silver are miscible with each other but neither is miscible in liquid lead. These properties are used for liquid-liquid extraction in the Parkes process, where lead containing any amount of silver is melted with zinc. The silver migrates to the zinc, which is skimmed off the top of the two-phase liquid, and the zinc is then boiled away, leaving nearly pure silver.

== Effect of entropy ==
If a mixture of polymers has lower configurational entropy than the components, they are likely to be immiscible in one another even in the liquid state.

== Determination ==
Miscibility of two materials is often determined optically. When the two miscible liquids are combined, the resulting liquid is clear. If the mixture is cloudy the two materials are immiscible. Care must be taken with this determination. If the indices of refraction of the two materials are similar, an immiscible mixture may be clear and give an incorrect determination that the two liquids are miscible.

== See also ==
- Emulsion
- Heteroazeotrope
- ITIES
- Miscibility gap
- Mixture
- Multiphasic liquid
- Solubility
