= Biofuel in the United States =

The United States produces mainly biodiesel and ethanol fuel, which uses corn as the main feedstock. The US is the world's largest producer of ethanol, having produced nearly 16 billion gallons in 2017 alone. The United States, together with Brazil accounted for 85% of all ethanol production, with total world production of 27.05 billion gallons. Biodiesel is commercially available in most oilseed-producing states. As of 2005, it was somewhat more expensive than fossil diesel, though it is still commonly produced in relatively small quantities, in comparison to petroleum products and ethanol fuel.

Biofuels are mainly used mixed with fossil fuels. They are also used as additives. The largest biodiesel consumer is the U.S. Army. Most light vehicles on the road today in the US can run on blends of up to 10% ethanol, and motor vehicle manufacturers already produce vehicles designed to run on much higher ethanol blends. The demand for bioethanol fuel in the United States was stimulated by the discovery in the late 90s that methyl tertiary butyl ether (MTBE), an oxygenate additive in gasoline, was contaminating groundwater. Cellulosic biofuels are under development, to avoid upward pressure on food prices and land use changes that would be expected to result from a major increase in use of food biofuels.

Biofuels are not just limited to liquid fuels. One of the often overlooked uses of biomass in the United States is in the gasification of biomass. There is a small, but growing number of people using woodgas to fuel cars and trucks all across America.

The challenge is to expand the market for biofuels beyond the farm states where they have been most popular to date. Flex-fuel vehicles are assisting in this transition because they allow drivers to choose different fuels based on price and availability.

The growing ethanol and biodiesel industries are providing jobs in plant construction, operations, and maintenance, mostly in rural communities. According to the Renewable Fuels Association, the ethanol industry created almost 154,000 U.S. jobs in 2005 alone, boosting household income by $5.7 billion. It also contributed about $3.5 billion in tax revenues at the local, state, and federal levels. On the other hand, in 2010, the industry received $6.646 billion in federal support, not counting state and local support.

Based upon average U.S. corn yields for the years 2007 through 2012, conversion of the entire US corn crop would yield 34.4 billion gallons of ethanol which is approximately 25% of 2012 finished motor fuel demand.

== History ==
The United States used biofuel in the beginning of the 20th century. For example, models of Ford T ran with ethanol fuel. Then the interest in biofuels declined until the first and second oil crisis, in 1973 and 1979.

The Department of Energy established the National Renewable Energy Laboratory in 1974 and started to work in 1977. The NREL publish papers on biofuels. Congress also voted the Energy Policy Act in 1994 and a newer in 2005 to promote renewable fuels.

Congress established regulars under the Energy Policy Act of 2005 intended to encourage the mixing of renewable fuels into our nation's motor vehicle fuel supply. Congress supported the renewable fuels program under the Energy Independence and Security Act of 2007 to contain particular annual volume standards for complete renewable fuel and also for the fixed renewable fuel groups of biomass-based diesel, biofuel, and advanced biofuel. The reassessed statutory requirements also incorporate new criteria for both renewable fuels and for the feedstocks used to produce them, including lifecycle greenhouse gas emission thresholds.

== Legislation ==
=== Renewable Fuel Standard (RFS1) ===
The current National Renewable Fuel Standard program (RFS1) was established under the Energy Policy Act of 2005, which amended the Clean Air Act by establishing the first national renewable fuel standard. The U.S. Congress gave the U.S. Environmental Protection Agency (EPA) the responsibility to coordinate with the U.S. Department of Energy, the U.S. Department of Agriculture, and stakeholders to design and implement this new program.

The Renewable Fuel Standard called for 7.5 billion US gallons (28×10^{6} m^{3}) of biofuels to be used annually by 2012, expanding the market for biofuels.

The EPA announced that the 2009 Renewable Fuel Standard will require most refiners, importers, and non-oxygenate blenders of gasoline to displace 10.21% of their gasoline with renewable fuels such as ethanol. That requirement aims to ensure that at least 11.1 billion US gallons (42×10^{6} m^{3}) of renewable fuels will be sold in 2009, in keeping with the targets established by the Energy Independence and Security Act of 2007 (EISA). While the RFS requirement is increasing by about 23%—from 9 billion US gallons (34×10^{6} m^{3}) in 2008 to 11.1 billion US gallons (42×10^{6} m^{3}) in 2009—the percentage requirement is increasing by nearly one third, from 7.76% in 2008 to 10.21% in 2009.

The EPA determines that fuel blenders are meeting renewable fuel requirements by examining Renewable Identification Numbers that they submit to the agency.

The 2009 RFS is also pushing up against what is known as the "blend wall". To address the blend wall issue, DOE and others are studying the use of mid-range blends, such as E15 and E20, for use in standard gasoline-burning vehicles. Allowing all gasoline blends to contain up to 20% ethanol would double the potential market for ethanol.

=== Renewable Fuel Standard (RFS2) ===
In May 2009, the EPA released proposed revisions to the National Renewable Fuel Standard program. These revisions addressed changes to the Renewable Fuel Standard program as required by EISA. The revised statutory requirements establish new specific volume standards for cellulosic biofuel, biomass-based diesel, advanced biofuel, and total renewable fuel that must be used in transportation fuel each year. The revised statutory requirements also include new definitions and criteria for both renewable fuels and the feedstocks used to produce them, including new greenhouse gas emission (GHG) thresholds for renewable fuels. The regulatory requirements for RFS will apply to domestic and foreign producers and importers of renewable fuel.

Of these modifications, several are significantly notable. First, the volume standard under RFS2 was increased beginning in 2008 from 5.4 to 9.0 billion US gallons (20,000,000 to 34,000,000 m^{3}). Thereafter, the required volume continues to increase under RFS2, eventually reaching 36 billion US gallons (140×10^{6} m^{3}) by 2022.

==== Volume Standards ====
Renewable Fuel Volume Requirements for RFS2
| Year | Biomass-based diesel | | Cellulosic biofuel | | Total advanced biofuel | | Total renewable fuel | |
| Year | billion US gallons | million cubic meters | billion US gallons | million cubic meters | billion US gallons | million cubic meters | billion US gallons | million cubic meters |
|---|---|---|---|---|---|---|---|---|
| 2009 | 0.5 | 1.9 | — | — | 0.6 | 2.3 | 11.1 | 42 |
| 2010 | 0.65 | 2.5 | 0.1 | 0.38 | 0.95 | 3.6 | 12.95 | 49.0 |
| 2011 | 0.8 | 3.0 | 0.25 | 0.95 | 1.35 | 5.1 | 13.95 | 52.8 |
| 2012 | 1.0 | 3.8 | 0.5 | 1.9 | 2.0 | 7.6 | 15.2 | 58 |
| 2013 | 1.0 | 3.8 | 1.0 | 3.8 | 2.75 | 10.4 | 16.55 | 62.6 |
| 2014 | 1.0 | 3.8 | 1.75 | 6.6 | 3.75 | 14.2 | 18.15 | 68.7 |
| 2015 | 1.0 | 3.8 | 3.0 | 11 | 5.5 | 21 | 20.5 | 78 |
| 2016 | 1.0 | 3.8 | 4.25 | 16.1 | 7.25 | 27.4 | 22.25 | 84.2 |
| 2017 | 1.0 | 3.8 | 5.5 | 21 | 9.0 | 34 | 24.0 | 91 |
| 2018 | 1.0 | 3.8 | 5.5 | 21 | 9.0 | 34 | 24.0 | 91 |
| 2019 | 1.0 | 3.8 | 8.5 | 32 | 13.0 | 49 | 28.0 | 106 |
| 2020 | 1.0 | 3.8 | 10.5 | 40 | 15.0 | 57 | 30.0 | 114 |
| 2021 | 1.0 | 3.8 | 13.5 | 51 | 18.0 | 68 | 33.0 | 125 |
| 2022 | 1.0 | 3.8 | 16.0 | 61 | 21.0 | 79 | 36.0 | 136 |

==== Greenhouse gas reduction thresholds ====
EISA established new renewable fuel categories and eligibility requirements, including setting the first ever mandatory greenhouse gas reduction thresholds for the various categories of fuels. For each renewable fuel pathway, greenhouse gas emissions are evaluated over the full life cycle, including production and transport of the feedstock; land use change; production, distribution, and blending of the renewable fuel; and end use of the renewable fuel. The GHG emissions are then compared to the life cycle emissions of 2005 petroleum baseline fuels (base year established as 2005 by EISA) displaced by the renewable fuel, such as gasoline or diesel. The life cycle GHG emissions performance reduction thresholds as established by EISA range from 20 to 60 percent reduction depending on the renewable fuel category.

Lifecycle GHG thresholds specified in EISA (percent reduction from 2005 baseline)
| RIN code | Type | % reduction |
|---|---|---|
| D6 | Conventional biofuel | 20% |
| D5 | Advanced biofuels | 50% |
| D4 | Biomass-derived diesel | 50% |
| D3 | Cellulosic biofuel | 60% |
| D7 | Cellulosic diesel | 60% |

A 2022 study found that land use change emissions resulting from the RFS2 were likely large enough to preclude corn ethanol from complying with the 20% greenhouse gas reductions required of "conventional biofuel" under the EISA.

== Renewable fuels ==
=== Ethanol fuel ===
The demand for ethanol fuel in the United States was stimulated by the discovery in the late 1990s that methyl tertiary butyl ether (MTBE), an oxygenate additive in gasoline, was contaminating groundwater. Due to the risks of widespread and costly litigation, and because MTBE use in gasoline was banned in almost 20 states by 2006, the substitution of MTBE opened a new market for ethanol fuel. This demand shift for ethanol as an oxygenate additive took place at a time when oil prices were already significantly rising. This shift also contributed to an expansion in the use of gasohol E10 and to a sharp increase in the production and sale of E85 flex vehicles since 2002.

United States ^{(1)} States with mandatory use of E10 blend
| Iowa | E10 | Missouri | E10 |
| Hawaii | E10 | Montana | E10 |
| Kansas | E10 | Oregon | E10 |
| Louisiana | E10 | Washington | E10 |
| Minnesota | E10 | | |

==== Low ethanol blends ====
Most cars on the road today in the U.S. can run on blends of up to 10% ethanol (E10), and motor vehicle manufacturers already produce vehicles designed to run on much higher ethanol blends. Though E10 is mandatory only in 10 states, ethanol blends in the US are available in other states as optional or added on lower percentages as a substitute to MTBE (used to oxygenate gasoline) without any labeling, making E blends present in two-thirds of the US gas supply.

==== Flex-fuel vehicles ====
Ford, DaimlerChrysler, and GM are among the automobile companies that sell "flexible-fuel" cars, trucks, and minivans that can use gasoline and ethanol blends ranging from pure gasoline up to 85% ethanol (E85). By mid-2008, there were approximately seven million E85-compatible vehicles on U.S. roads. However, a 2005 survey found that 68% of American flex-fuel car owners were not aware they owned an E85 flex. This is due to the fact that the exterior of flex and non-flex vehicles look exactly the same; there is no sale price difference between them; the lack of consumer's awareness about E85s; and also the decision of American automakers of not putting any kind of exterior labeling, so buyers can be aware they are getting an E85 vehicle. Since 2006 many new FFV models in the US feature a bright yellow gas cap to remind drivers of the E85 capabilities, and GM is also using badging with the text "Flexfuel/E85 Ethanol" to clearly mark the car as an E85 FFV.

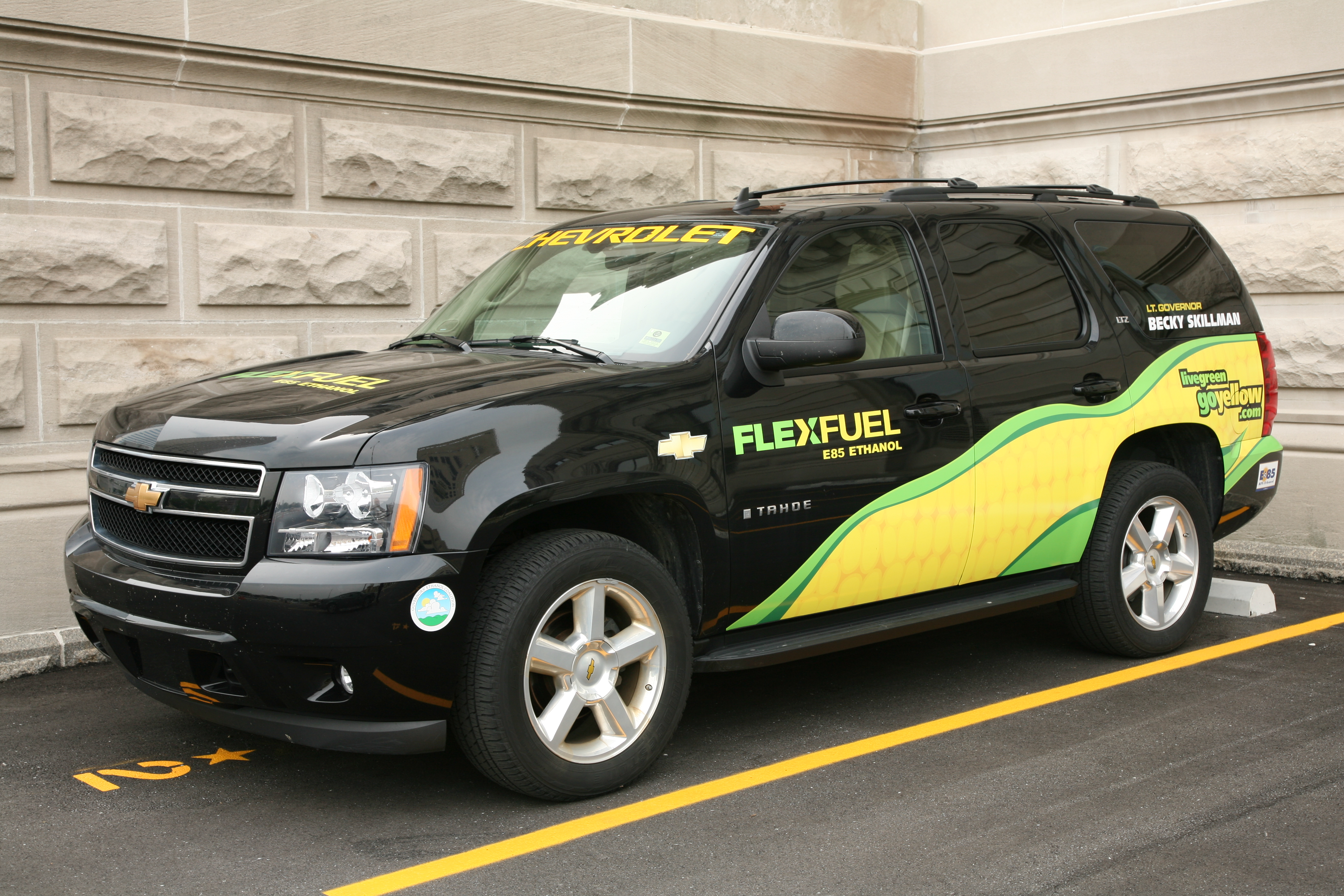
Promotional E85 Flexfuel Chevy Tahoe.

A major restriction hampering sales of E85 flex vehicles or fuelling with E85, is the limited infrastructure available to sell E85 to the public, as by October 2008 there were only 1,802 gasoline filling stations selling E85 to the public in the entire US, with a great concentration of E85 stations in the Corn Belt states, led by Minnesota with 357 stations, more than any other state, followed by Illinois with 189, Wisconsin with 118, and Missouri with 112. Only seven states do not have E85 available to the public, Alaska, Hawaii, Maine, New Hampshire, New Jersey, Rhode Island, and Vermont. The main constraint for a more rapid expansion of E85 availability is that it requires dedicated storage tanks at filling stations, at an estimated cost of USD 60,000 for each dedicated ethanol tank.

Chrysler, General Motors, and Ford have each pledged to manufacture 50 percent of their entire vehicle line as flexible fuel in model year 2012, if enough fueling infrastructure develops. Regarding energy policy, President-elect Barack Obama pledged during his electoral campaign to significantly reduce oil consumption, with measures that among others include mandating all new vehicles to have FFV capability by the end of 2013.

=== Biodiesel ===
GreenHunter Energy, Inc. has begun commercial operations at its biodiesel refinery in Houston, Texas, that can produce 105 million US gallons per year (400×10^{3} m^{3}/a) of biodiesel. That production capacity makes it the largest biodiesel refinery in the United States, barely beating out the 100 million US gallons per year (380×10^{3} m^{3}/a) biodiesel refinery built by Imperium Renewables in Washington.

For comparison, the total U.S. production capacity for biodiesel reached 2,240 million US gallons per year (8.5×10^{6} m^{3}/a) in 2007, although poor market conditions held 2007 production to about 450 million US gallons (1.7×10^{6} m^{3}), according to the National Biodiesel Board (NBB).

In 2006, Fuel Bio Opened the largest biodiesel manufacturing plant on the east coast of the United States in Elizabeth, New Jersey. Fuel Bio's operation is capable of producing a name plate capacity of 50 million US gallons (190×10^{3} m^{3}) of biodiesel per year.

=== Methanol fuel ===
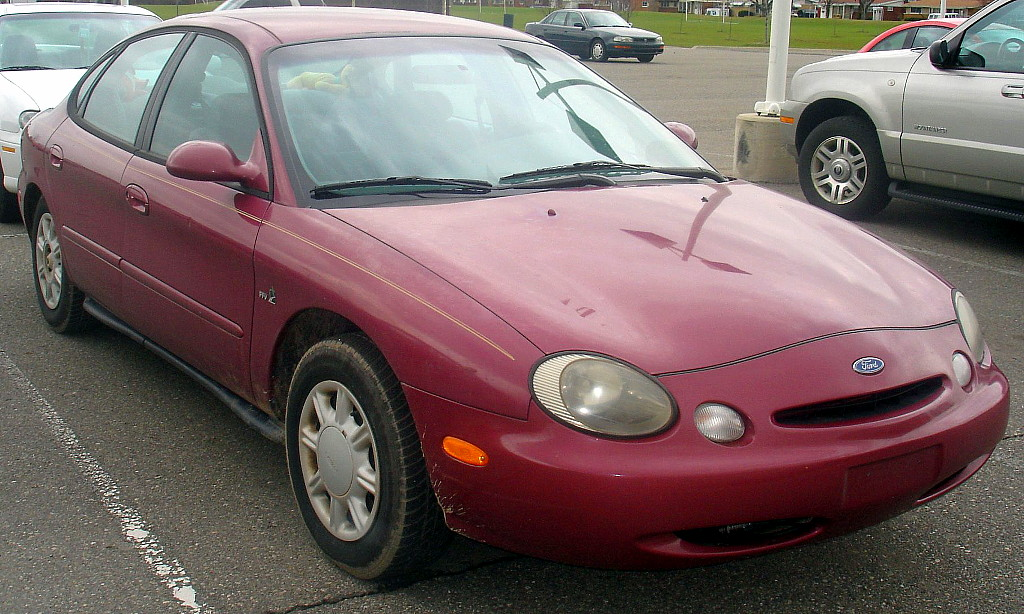
The 1996 Ford Taurus was the first flexible-fuel vehicle produced with versions capable of running with either ethanol (E85) or methanol (M85) blended with gasoline.

Methanol was first produced from pyrolysis of wood, resulting in its common English name of wood alcohol. Presently, methanol is usually produced using methane, the chief constituent of natural gas, as a raw material. It may also be produced by pyrolysis of many organic materials or by Fischer–Tropsch from synthetic gas, so be called biomethanol. Production of methanol from synthesis gas using Biomass-To-Liquid can offer methanol production from biomass at efficiencies up to 75%. Widespread production by this route has a postulated potential (see Olah reference above) to offer methanol fuel at a low cost and with benefits to the environment. These production methods, however, are not suitable for small scale production.

Successful test programs in Europe and the US, mainly in California, were conducted with methanol flex-fuel vehicles, known as M85 flex-fuel vehicles. Ford began development of a flexible-fuel vehicle in 1982, and between 1985 and 1992, 705 experimental FFVs were built and delivered to California and Canada, including the 1.6L Ford Escort, the 3.0L Taurus, and the 5.0L LTD Crown Victoria. These vehicles could operate on either gasoline or methanol with only one fuel system. Legislation was passed to encourage the US auto industry to begin production, which started in 1993 for the M85 FFVs at Ford.

In 1996, a new FFV Ford Taurus was developed, with models fully capable of running on either methanol or ethanol blended with gasoline. This ethanol version of the Taurus became the first commercial production of an E85 FFV. The momentum of the FFV production programs at the American car companies continued, although by the end of the 1990s, the emphasis shifted to the E85 version, as it is today. Ethanol was preferred over methanol because there is a large support from the farming community, and thanks to the government's incentive programs and corn-based ethanol subsidies.

In 2005, California's Governor, Arnold Schwarzenegger, terminated the use of methanol after 25 years and 200 million miles of successful operation, to join the expanding use of ethanol driven by producers of corn. In spite of this, he was optimistic about the future of the program, claiming "it will be back.". In 2009, ethanol was priced at 2 to 3 dollars per gallon, while methanol made from natural gas remains at 47 cents per gallon. Presently there are over 60 operating gas stations in California supplying methanol in their pumps.

=== Butanol fuel ===
A team of chemical engineers at the University of Arkansas have developed a method for converting common algae into butanol, which can be used as fuel in existing gasoline internal combustible engines. The algae are grown on "raceway" troughs and the algaes growth is enhanced by delivering high concentrations of carbon dioxide through hollow fiber membranes.

Questions have been raised about the amount of energy needed to produce fuel-grade ethanol compared to the amount of energy it releases upon combustion. Depending on who you ask, you may get a different answer as to whether or not ethanol from corn produces more energy than it consumes.

Therefore, companies like BP and DuPont have been looking at the next generation of biofuel, specifically investigating butanol.

Specific advantages to using butanol compared to ethanol include, higher energy content per kg, the ability to be blended at higher concentrations without further adaptation of vehicles, and potential to use existing storage/transport infrastructure.

Using corn as a feedstock to produce either ethanol or butanol seems infeasible without significant technology improvements regarding yields. Currently, about 2.5 US gallons (9.5 L) of butanol can be produced per bushel of corn (373 l/t). Meanwhile, about 2.75 US gallons (10.4 L) of ethanol can be produced per bushel of corn (410 l/t). Our current production of ethanol is about 5 billion US gallons per year (19×10^{6} m^{3}/a), but it requires 20% of the United States' corn crop and only replaces 1% of its petroleum use. Reaching the 36 billion US gallons (140×10^{6} m^{3}) biofuel mandate by 2022, would be a difficult task if only using a corn grain feedstock.

=== Renewable Natural Gas (RNG) ===
Many cellulosic biomass materials produce methane naturally. Methane is the main component of natural gas. Naturally occurring methane is often considered a source of pollution from landfills, dairy farms, and human waste sources. The EPA routinely issues rules to reduce the emission of methane from landfills and other sources.

Naturally occurring methane emissions, typically called landfill gas or biogas, are not clean enough to be introduced directly in the US National Natural Gas Pipeline system, but technology to do so has been developed. The pipeline quality gas is called Renewable Natural Gas (RNG).

In July 2014 the EPA issued a ruling that RNG produced from landfills would qualify as D3 RIN qualifying fuel under RFS2. In one month's time, D3 RIN generation soared from the 4,000 recorded for July to 3.49 million for August 2014. As can be seen by the 4,000 D3 RIN credits issued in July 2014, industry had made little progress at developing an economically viable D3 fuel prior to the EPAs ruling that RNG from landfills would qualify as a D3 fuel.

D3 RIN generation has continued to increase and 2 years later in August 2016 it was 15.6 million EGE (ethanol equivalent gallons). In 2015, over 98% of D3 RIN credits issued were issued for RNG.

The American Biogas Council believes 17.9 billion diesel gallon equivalents of RNG can be produced each year from the existing US waste stream.

== By state ==
=== Louisiana ===
Louisiana State University Agricultural Center researchers in the Louisiana Institute for Biofuels and Bioprocessing are studying the regular production of biomass for economically viable conversion to biofuels and bioenergy using existing refinery infrastructure. This project, called the LSU AgCenter Sustainable Bioproducts Initiative, involves a team of university and industry partners who are studying how to use energy cane and sweet sorghum to help reinvigorate the Louisiana sugar and chemical industries. The project will expand the United States' southern regional agricultural sector by utilizing sweet sorghum and energy cane to produce butanol, gasoline, isoprene and byproduct chemicals. Developers believe the project eventually will contribute significantly to improving rural prosperity and job creation in the southern region of the United States.

=== Michigan ===
Michigan State University researcher Bruce Dale says that 30% of USA's energy can be achieved by 2030. The greenhouse emissions are reduced by 86% for cellulose compared to corn's 29% reduction. A plant is being built now in Georgia to make up to 100 million US gallons (380,000 m^{3}) per year.

=== Minnesota ===
Minnesota Governor Tim Pawlenty signed a bill in May 2008, that will require all diesel fuel sold in the state for use in internal combustion engines to contain at least 20% biodiesel by May 1, 2015.

=== Oregon ===
Oregon Governor Ted Kulongoski signed legislation in July 2007 that will require all gasoline sold in the state to be blended with 10% bioethanol, a blend known as BE10, and all diesel fuel sold in the state to be blended with 2% biodiesel, a blend known as BD2. Oregon currently has the only biofuels station in the country that can be used by any type of vehicle.

== United States Department of Energy projects ==
The United States Department of Energy has announced that it has selected six university-led advanced biofuels projects to receive up to $4.4 million, subject to annual appropriations. The awardees—Georgia Tech Research Corporation, the University of Georgia, the University of Maine, Montana State University, Steven's Institute of Technology in New Jersey, and the University of Toledo in Ohio—will all receive funding to conduct research and development of cost-effective, environmentally friendly biomass conversion technologies for turning non-food feedstocks into advanced biofuels. Combined with a university cost share of 20%, more than $5.7 million is slated for investment in these projects.

Most of the projects will involve microbiology, including the University of Georgia and Montana State University projects, which are both focused on producing oils from algae. The University of Georgia will investigate using poultry litter to produce low-cost nutrients for algae, while Montana State, in partnership with Utah State University, will research the oil content, growth, and oil production of algae cultures in open ponds. Applying microbiology to biomass conversion, the University of Maine will study using bacteria to create biofuels from regionally available feedstocks, such as seaweed sludge and paper mill waste streams, while the University of Toledo will attempt to use enzyme-containing pellets to efficiently convert cellulosic biomass into ethanol.

In contrast, Georgia Tech Research Corporation and Steven's Institute of Technology are both investigating the gasification of biomass. Georgia Tech will evaluate two experimental gasifiers run on forest residues, while Steven's Institute will test a novel microchannel reactor that gasifies pyrolysis oil, a petroleum-like oil produced by exposing biomass sources such as wood chips to high temperatures in the absence of oxygen. Gasified biomass can be used as a gaseous fuel or passed through a catalyst to produce a wide range of liquid fuels and chemicals.

== Biofuel companies ==
Costs of producing ethanol from cellulosic feedstock such as wood chips are still about 70% higher than production from corn, because of an extra step in the production process, when compared to production of corn-derived ethanol. Until recently, the idea of extracting ethanol from farm waste and other sources was largely limited to university campuses and federal labs due to production problems, as well as the need to bring together a vast team of specialists.

Environmental groups, biotechnology firms, major oil companies, chemical giants, automakers, defense hawks, and venture capitalists have collaborated in the effort to mass-produce cost-effiective cellulosic ethanol.

The majority of such biofuel companies (Iogen Corporation, SunOpta's BioProcess Group, Genencor, Novozymes, Dyadic International, Inc. (DYAI), Kansas City-based Alternative Energy Sources, Inc. [Nasdaq:AENS], Flex Fuels USA based in Huntsville, Alabama (now owned by Alternative Energy Sources), or BRI Energy, LLC, Abengoa Bioenergy) are located in North America.

Archer-Daniels-Midland Company (ADM) has invested heavily into building approximately 100 corn-ethanol production plants, known as bio-refineries, and churns out about one-fifth of the country's ethanol supply. This occurred due to seasonal overcapacity in its corn syrup plants when surplus was available to produce ethanol. ADM is in a unique position to utilize unused parts of the corn crop, and convert previously discarded waste into a viable product. The hull surrounding corn contains fiber that the Decatur, Illinois, grain-processing giant's ethanol-making microorganisms can not use. Figuring out how to convert the fiber into more sugar could increase the output of an existing corn-ethanol plant by 15%. Consequently, ADM would not have to figure out how to collect a new source of biomass but merely use the existing infrastructure for gathering corn. ADM executives want government help to build a plant that could cost between $50 million and $100 million. ADM hired the head of petroleum refining at Chevron, Patricia A. Woertz, to metamorphose ADM into the Exxon-Mobil of the ethanol industry.

Meanwhile, DuPont, the chemical giant, is attempting to figure out how to construct a bio-refinery fueled by corn stover—the stalk and leaves that are left in the field after farmers harvest their crop. The company's goal is to make ethanol from cellulose as cheaply as from corn kernels by 2009. If it works, the technology could double the amount of ethanol produced by a field of corn.

Cello Energy proposed to produce biofuel from wood chips and other biomass. In 2010, the Environmental Protection Agency planned on blending 100.7 million gallons of biofuel to the country's fuel supply, with 70 percent of the biofuel provided by Cello Energy. However, the company declared bankruptcy in 2010 after losing a federal lawsuit for defrauding investors.

Diversa Corporation, a biotech company based in San Diego, examined how biomass is converted into energy in the natural environment. They have found that the enzymes inherent in the bacteria and protozoa that inhabit the digestive tracts of the household termite efficiently convert 95% of cellulose into fermentable sugars. Using proprietary DNA extraction and cloning technologies, they were able to isolate the cellulose-degrading enzymes. By reenacting this natural process, the company created a cocktail of high-performance enzymes for industrial ethanol production enablers. Although still in the early stages of this work, the initial results are promising. Currently, these expensive enzymes cost about 25 cents per gallon of ethanol, although this price is very likely to decline by half in the coming years.

Construction of the first U.S. commercial plant producing cellulosic ethanol will commence in the State of Iowa in February 2007. The Voyager Ethanol plant in Emmetsburg, owned by POET, LLC, will be converted from a 50-million-US-gallon-per-year (190×10^{3} m^{3}/a) conventional corn dry mill facility into a 125-million-US-gallon-per-year (470×10^{3} m^{3}/a) commercial-scale biorefinery producing ethanol from not only corn but also the stalk, leaves, and cobs of the corn plant.

Most ethanol plants rely on natural gas to power their processing equipment. The process to be used at the Emmetsburg plant will enable the plant to make 11% more ethanol by weight of corn and 27% more by area of corn. The process cuts the need for fossil fuel power at the plant by 83% by using some of its own byproduct for power. The $200 million plant is scheduled to begin in February and take about 30 months to complete. Project completion is contingent upon partial funding from a USDOE grant, which is likely as the U.S. Government views the renewable energy project as a full-blown national security issue.

Green Plains Renewable Energy claims to be the fourth largest ethanol fuel producer in North America (as of February 2012).

== See also ==
- Biobutanol
- Biorefinery
- Ethanol fuel in the United States
- E85 in the United States
- Renewable Fuel Standard
- Woodgas

US renewables:

- Renewable energy in the United States
- Wind power in the United States
- Solar power in the United States
- Geothermal energy in the United States
- Hydroelectric power in the United States

General:

- Energy policy of the United States
- Greenhouse gas emissions by the United States
- Renewable energy commercialization in the United States

International:

- Biofuels by region
- List of renewable energy topics by country
- Renewable energy by country
