= Biodiesel in the United States =

Overview of biodiesel use in the United States

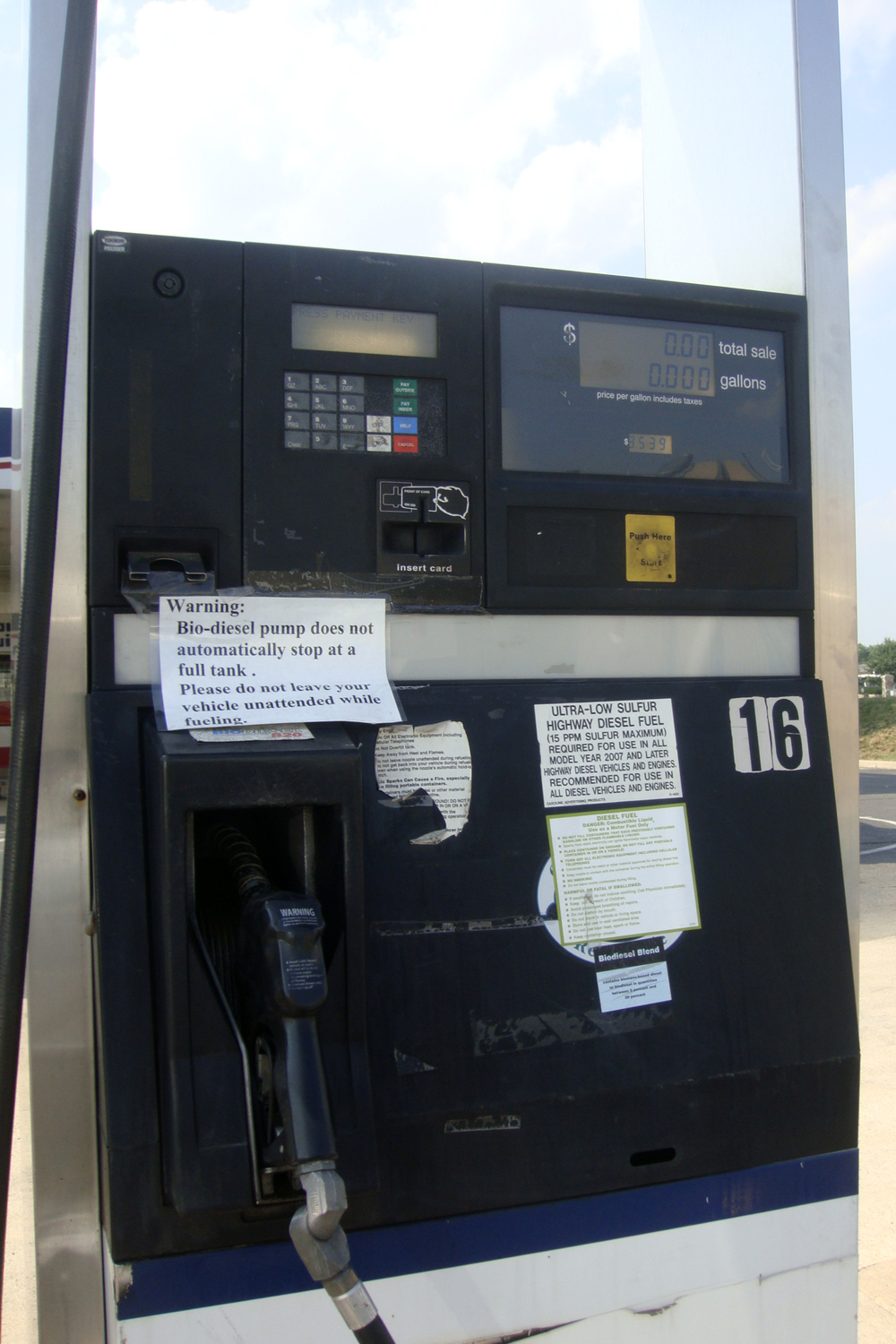
Biodiesel B20 pump in Arlington, Virginia.

Biodiesel is commercially available in most oilseed-producing states in the United States. As of 2023, it is less expensive than petroleum-diesel, though it is still commonly produced in relatively small quantities (in comparison to petroleum products and ethanol fuel).

The total U.S. production capacity for biodiesel reached 2.24 billion US gallons per year (8.5×10^{6} m^{3}/a) in 2007, although poor market conditions held 2007 production to about 450 million US gallons (1.7×10^{6} m^{3}), according to the National Biodiesel Board (NBB).

In 2020, about 1.8 billion gallons of biodiesel were produced in the United States, with about 197 million gallons and 145 million gallons being imported and exported respectively.

U.S. biodiesel production hit an all-time high in 2015, its second record-breaking year in a row. EPA statistics show production of 1.813 billion gallons in 2015, up from the previous record of 1.74 billion gallons in 2014.

== Feedstock development ==
A pilot project in Unalaska/Dutch Harbor, Alaska, is producing fish oil biodiesel from the local fish processing industry in conjunction with the University of Alaska Fairbanks. It is rarely economic to ship the fish oil elsewhere and Alaskan communities are heavily dependent on diesel power generation. The Alaskan Energy Authority factories project 8 million US gallons (30×10^{3} m^{3}) of fish oil annually.

A doctoral student at Utah State University has initiated a program called FreeWays to Fuel, which is growing oilseed crops in previously unused municipal land such as highway rights of way. The student, Dallas Hanks, estimates that in the U.S., 10 million acres (40,000 km^{2}) of such unused land exists—land which generally serves no other purpose and currently costs tax dollars to maintain. Early yields from the crops are promising, and the program has spread to other land-grant universities across the nation.

== Production ==
Imperium Renewables in Washington has the largest biodiesel production facility in the US, capable of making 100 million US gallons per year (380×10^{3} m^{3}/a).

In 2006, Fuel Bio Opened the largest biodiesel manufacturing plant on the east coast of the United States in Elizabeth, New Jersey. Fuel Bio's operation is capable of producing a name plate capacity of 50 million US gallons per year (190×10^{3} m^{3}/a) of biodiesel.

In 2008, ASTM published new Biodiesel Blend Specifications.

In 2019, HollyFrontier announced plans to build a biodiesel plant in Artesia, NM. The facility was completed in 2022, and began production that same year. It has a capacity of 125 million gallons per year.

== Commercialization ==
In 2005, U.S. entertainer Willie Nelson was selling B20 Biodiesel in four states under the name BioWillie. By late 2005 it was available at 13 gas stations and truck stops (mainly in Texas). Most purchasers were truck drivers. It was also used to fuel the buses and trucks for Mr. Nelson's tours as well as his personal automobiles.

On October 16, 2006, the city of Kalamazoo, Michigan announced an agreement with local Western Michigan University's biodiesel R & D program to use the biodiesel research to build a 100 thousand US gallons per year (380 m^{3}/a) production system at the city wastewater treatment plant, and convert the city bus system to run entirely off of the fuel. Its use of "trap grease" from the waste tanks of restaurants around the city may be the first of its kind in the US.

== Incentives ==
=== Tax credits ===
As of 2003, some tax credits were available in the U.S. for using biodiesel.

== By state ==
Biodiesel retailers can be found in all states but Alaska, though all may not offer high percentage blends or B100.

=== Minnesota ===
Then-Governor of Minnesota Tim Pawlenty signed a bill on May 12, 2008, that will require all diesel fuel sold in the state for use in internal compression engines to contain at least 20% biodiesel by May 1, 2015.

In March 2002, the Minnesota State Legislature passed a bill which mandated that all diesel sold in the state must contain at least 2% biodiesel. The requirement took effect on June 30, 2005, and was the first biodiesel mandate in the US.

=== Washington State ===
In March 2006, Washington became the second state to pass a 2% biodiesel mandate, with a start-date set for December 1, 2008.

== See also ==
- BioWillie
- National Biodiesel Board
