= United States biofuel policies =

United States policy in regard to biofuels, such as ethanol fuel and biodiesel, began in the early 1990s as the government began looking more intensely at biofuels as a way to reduce dependence on foreign oil and increase the nation's overall sustainability. Since then, biofuel policies have been refined, focused on getting the most efficient fuels commercially available, creating fuels that can compete with petroleum-based fuels, and ensuring that the agricultural industry can support and sustain the use of biofuels.

== Introduction ==
=== Case for biofuels ===
In 2010, the United States imported about 4.3 billion barrels (680,000,000 m^{3}) of crude oil. Add to this about 2.01 billion barrels (320,000,000 m^{3}) produced in the United States, and the total consumption in the United States is 6.3 billion barrels (1.00×10^{9} m^{3}) of crude for 2010. Imported oil accounted for 2/3 of the oil supply in the US, with about 42% of imported oil coming from OPEC countries.

According to the British Petroleum Statistical Review, world oil reserves are considered to be 1,333.1 billion barrels (2.1195×10^{11} m^{3}). Of this, 754.2 billion barrels (1.1991×10^{11} m^{3}), or close to 60% of the world's oil supply, are located in the Middle East. The United States contains about 2.1% of the world's oil supply, about 28 billion barrels (4.5×10^{9} m^{3}). About 1/3 of U.S. oil consumption comes from domestic supplies, and with current trends in production, U.S. oil reserves are expected to be depleted in about 10 years. The world's two largest developing economies, China and India, are expected to deplete their reserves in about 10 and 21 years, respectively.

At current rates of production, the oil reserves in the Middle East are expected to be depleted in 85 years. Once the reserves in the U.S., China, and India are depleted, these countries will have to rely much more heavily on oil importation, putting more pressure on oil exporting areas of the world, and thus draining reserves in at a faster rate. The BP Statistical Review predicts the depletion of all the world's proven oil reserves in 45.7 years.

In 2009, the world consumed 84 million barrels (13,400,000 m^{3}) of crude oil per day, which translates to 30.7 billion barrels (4.88×10^{9} m^{3}) a year. This is a vast mount of nonrenewable energy, and numerous alternative fuel options are being explored to replace this fossil fuel. Of all the options for new fuels, biofuels stand out as the most compatible. The other possible alternatives have a number of technological and economical hurdles that prevent them from being as feasible as biofuels.

One option being considered is hydrogen. Hydrogen burns clean, and is an extremely abundant atom on Earth. The problem is that hydrogen does not exist by itself on Earth. Instead, it is locked in hydrocarbon molecules and water molecules. Collecting hydrogen, either from reformed methane or electrolysis of water, is a very expensive and energy intensive. Hydrogen cars, either as hydrogen combustion or fuel cells, require the installation of new infrastructure for hydrogen production, transportation, storage, distribution, and vehicle refueling. The current gasoline infrastructure is designed to operate around a liquid fuel, not a gaseous fuel. Current vehicles are not designed to use hydrogen fuel, which would require existing cars to be retrofitted and future cars to be redesigned.

Another option being considered is battery powered electric vehicles. Though they do not directly consume fossil fuels, they do rely on an external source to provide the necessary electricity, and the most widely used fuel for electricity generation is coal. As with hydrogen cars, current cars would need to be retrofitted and future cars would need to be redesigned with electric drive trains. Currently there is no large-scale recharging network for plug in vehicles. Battery technology also hampers the feasibility of electric vehicles. Lead acid batteries are heavy and hold less charge than their competitors, lithium-ion batteries. Lithium-ion batteries hold more charge and are lighter than lead acid batteries, but are also more expensive.

Biofuels on the other hand, do not require new pumping infrastructure. With slight modifications, biofuels, which are a liquid fuel, can be compatible with the storage, transportation, distribution, and vehicle refueling infrastructure currently in existence. Since they are a combustible liquid, biofuels can be used in current internal combustion engines with some modifications.

=== Presidential orders ===
Goals for biofuel policy have usually been led or motivated by orders and recommendations from those in power. During his term as president George W. Bush discussed specific goals for biofuels in his State of the Union address in 2006 and 2007. In his 2006 speech he called for cellulosic ethanol to be cost competitive and on the market with corn based ethanol by the year 2012. A year later President Bush called for a complete reduction of 20% in U.S. gasoline consumption in 10 years. This goal was to be met by setting a Renewable Fuel Standard of 35 billion US gallons (130,000,000 m^{3}) by 2017 and by reforming and modernizing Corporate Average Fuel Economy (CAFE) standards. President Bush also called for increased investment in hydrogen fuels, advanced batteries, biodiesel fuels, and new fuel production methods. Recently Barack Obama has also echoed these sentiments, calling for a reduction in petroleum usage and an increase in biofuel production.

In September 2014, The American Petroleum Institute on Thursday accused the White House accused of attempting to use 2014 biofuel targets to influence a tight U.S. Senate race, stating that increase in the targets could raise the price of gasoline. The Renewable Fuel Standard requires increasing amounts of ethanol and biodiesel to be mixed into U.S. fuel supplies each year until 2022.

== Legislative history ==
=== Energy Policy Act of 1992 (EPAct 1992) ===
One of the first legislative documents to directly address the need of biofuels and their development was the Energy Policy Act of 1992 (Pub. L. 102–486). This Act directed more studies to be done on biofuels as well as gave some guidance for federal programs for the increased implementation of biofuels.

==== Title III – Alternative fuels: general ====
Title III addresses alternative fuels in a general sense. This title amends the Energy Policy and Conservation Act of 1975 (Pub. L. 94–163) and sets a number of guidelines for and requirements of the Secretary of Energy. It establishes guidelines for the Secretary of Energy to acquire alternative fueled vehicle for the Federal Fleet. It also requires the Secretary of Energy to study and report to Congress the Federal experience with alternative fueled heavy duty vehicles. The Secretary of Energy is also required to set a fiscal-year schedule for minimum Federal Fleet requirements for alternative fuel vehicles. Finally, it directs the Secretary to provide guidance and technical assistance to Federal agencies for the procurement and placement of alternative fueled vehicles.

Title III requires two other changes within the federal government related to alternative fuels. First, it directs the Administrator of General Services (the Administrator) to establish an annual recognition and incentive awards program for Federal employees who demonstrate the strongest commitment to the use of alternative fuels and fuel conservation in Federal motor vehicles. Second, it directs the Administrator and the Postmaster General to report to the Congress on the alternative-fueled vehicle program within their respective agencies.

==== Title IV – Alternative fuels: non-federal programs ====
Title IV makes 2 changes to existing laws in terms of alternative fuels. First, it amends the Energy Policy and Conservation Act of 1975 (Pub. L. 94–163) to authorize appropriations for FY 1993 through 1995 for the alternative fuels truck commercial application program. Second, it amends the Motor Vehicle Information and Cost Savings Act of 1972 (Pub. L. 94–364) to reflect the provisions of this Act regarding the use of alternative motor fuels.

Title IV directs the Secretary of Energy (the Secretary) to establish a public information program on the use of alternative fuels in motor vehicles, and requires the Secretary to establish a data collection program for persons engaged in certain activities related to alternative-fuel vehicles and facilities. This order also requires the Federal Trade Commission to formulate and issue rules for labeling requirements for alternative fuels and alternative fueled vehicles. Also, the Secretary is instructed to promulgate guidelines for comprehensive State program plans and incentives to accelerate the introduction and use of alternative fuels and alternative-fueled vehicles.

Title IV also makes changes for the Secretary of Transportation. It authorizes the Secretary of Transportation to enter into cooperative agreements and joint ventures with governmental and regional transit authorities of certain-sized urban areas to demonstrate the feasibility of commercial application of alternative fuels for motor vehicles used for mass transit (including school buses). The Secretary is directed to do 4 things:

- First, to ensure that a Federal certification program is established for technician training programs for converting conventionally fueled motor vehicles into dedicated or dual-fueled vehicles.
- Second, to conduct a study to determine whether the use of alternative fuels in non-road vehicles and engines would contribute substantially to reduced reliance on imported energy sources.
- Third, to report to the Congress on how Federal purchasing policies and governmental traffic control policies affect the use of alternative-fueled vehicles.
- Fourth, to establish a low-interest loan program to increase the use by small businesses of alternative-fueled vehicles.

==== Title V – Availability and use of replacement fuels, alternative fuels, and alternative fueled private vehicles ====
Title V sets forth a timetable for the acquisition of alternative-fueled vehicles by specified persons engaged in fuels transactions. It also sets forth specified fleet program purchase goals for alternative-fueled vehicles for specified calendar years (including mandatory State fleet programs), and sets forth civil penalties for violations of this Act.

This title also instructs the Secretary of Energy to:

- First, establish a program to promote the development and use in light duty motor vehicles of domestic replacement fuels in lieu of petroleum motor fuels.
- Second, estimate annually the use and supply of alternative and replacement fuels, and their effect upon greenhouse gas emissions.
- Third, require suppliers of replacement and alternative fuels to submit specified supply and greenhouse gas-related information to the Secretary.
- Fourth, obtain voluntary commitments from specified persons to make available to the public replacement fuels and alternative-fueled vehicles (and attendant services).

=== Energy Policy Act of 2005 (EPAct 2005) ===
The next major legislative document to specifically deal with biofuels was the Energy Policy Act of 2005 (Pub. L. 109–58 (text) (PDF)). It recommended new studies as well as gave Congress some more power in regulating the biofuel industry. It also made some large steps in encouraging the use of biofuels such as ethanol and biodiesel.

==== Title VII – Vehicles and fuel ====
Title VII makes changes for government agencies and vehicle fleets in relation to alternative fuels. First, in Section 701, the Energy Policy and Conservation Act (Pub. L. 94–163) is amended to cite circumstances that permit an agency to qualify for a waiver of the alternative fuel use requirement applicable to dual fueled federal light duty vehicles. Second, in Section 702, changes from discretionary to mandatory the authority of the General Services Administration (GSA), and any other federal agency that procures motor vehicles for distribution to other federal agencies, to allocate the incremental cost of alternative fueled vehicles over the cost of comparable gasoline vehicles across the entire fleet of motor vehicles distributed by such agency. Third, section 705 changes from November 13, 1999, to February 15, 2006, the deadline for the first annual report by each federal agency on its compliance with alternative fueled vehicle purchasing requirements. Fourth, Section 707 exempts from the alternative fuel requirements of the Energy Policy Act of 1992 (Pub. L. 102–486)vehicles directly used in the emergency repair of transmission lines and in the restoration of electricity service following power outages.

Title VII makes a number of changes for the Secretary of Energy. First, section 703 amends the Energy Policy Act of 1992 (Pub. L. 102–486) to authorize the Secretary of Energy to waive compliance with the fleet requirement program governing federal and state motor vehicle fleets. This applies only if it is shown that the fleet will achieve a reduction in annual petroleum fuel consumption, and complies with all applicable vehicle emission standards. Second, the Secretary of Energy is instructed by section 706 to establish a program to improve technologies for the commercialization two classifications of vehicles: 1) Combination hybrid/flexible fuel vehicle, 2) Combination plug-in hybrid/flexible fuel vehicle. This section also authorizes funds for FY2006-FY2009 for establishing this program. Third, section 704 directs the Secretary to study and report to Congress on the effect that certain alternative fueled vehicle requirements have had on three areas:
1) The development of alternative fueled vehicle technology,
2) The availability of that technology in the market,
3) The cost of alternative fueled vehicles.

==== Title IX – Research and development ====
===== Subtitle C: Renewable energy =====
Section 932 of Subtitle C directs the Secretary to conduct a program of research, development, demonstration, and commercial application for bioenergy. Areas of interest include: (1) biopower energy systems; (2) biofuels; (3) bioproducts; (4) integrated biorefineries that may produce biopower, biofuels, and bioproducts; and (5) cross-cutting research and development in feedstocks; (6) integrated biorefineries.

===== Subtitle D: Agricultural biomass research and development programs =====
Subtitle D creates of number of duties for the Secretaries of Energy and Agriculture. In Section 941 of Subtitle D, the Secretaries of Agriculture and of Energy are instructed to direct research and development toward three areas related to biofuels. First, feedstock production through the development of crops and cropping systems relevant to production of raw materials for conversion to biobased fuels and biobased products. Second, developing technologies for converting cellulosic biomass into intermediates that can subsequently be converted into biobased fuels and biobased products. Third, product diversification through technologies relevant to production of a range of biobased products (including chemicals, animal feeds, and cogenerated power) that eventually can increase the feasibility of fuel production in a biorefinery. This section authorizes funds for the program for FY2006-FY2015.

For the Secretary of Energy, section 942 Instructs the Secretary to establish an incentive program for the production of cellulosic biofuels. This section prescribes procedural guidelines including auction and reverse auction procedures.

For the Secretary of Agriculture, section 944 directs the Secretary to make available on a competitive basis grants for entities that meet any of three classifications. First, certain small manufacturers for biobased product marketing and certification purposes. Second, a certain regional bioeconomy development association, agricultural or energy trade association, or Land Grant institution. Third, enterprises owned by agricultural producers, for the purposes of demonstrating cost-effective, cellulosic biomass innovations for feedstock preprocessing and crop harvesting, with a requirement to produce ethanol, or for another energy purpose. This section authorizes funds for the program for FY2006-FY2015.

The Secretary of Agriculture is also instructed in Section 947 to carry out two actions. First, establish a program of education and outreach on biobased fuels and biobased products. Second, report to certain congressional committees on the economic potential for the United States of the widespread production and use of commercial and industrial biobased products through calendar year 2025.

==== Title XIII – Energy policy tax incentives ====
===== Subtitle D: Alternative motor vehicles and fuels incentives =====
Subtitle D of Title XIII created a number of tax incentives for production of biofuels and other alternative fuel technologies.

Two sections of Subtitle D address investing in alternative fuel technologies and installing small-scale infrastructure for alternative technologies. First, section 1341 allows a tax credit for investment in alternative motor vehicles technology, including qualified fuel cell, advanced lean burn technology, hybrid, and alternative fuel motor vehicles. Bases the amount of such credit on criteria relating to vehicle weight and fuel efficiency. Terminates such credit after 2014 for qualified fuel cell motor vehicles and after 2010 for advanced lean burn, hybrid, and alternative fuel motor vehicles. Second, section 1342 allows a tax credit for 30% of the cost of installing a commercial or residential refueling property for dispensing certain alternative fuels consisting of at least 85% by volume of ethanol, natural gas and petroleum gases, hydrogen, or biodiesel. Limits the dollar amount of such credit to $30,000 for commercial property and $1,000 for residential property. Terminates such credit after 2009 (after 2014 for property relating to hydrogen).

Four sections of Subtitle D address production of biofuels. First, section 1344 extended the biodiesel tax credit. Producers of biodiesel can claim a tax credit of $1.00 per gallon. As of this bill, the $1.00 credit applied to new agricultural-based biodiesel. A credit of 50 cents per gallon was applied to used feedstocks, such as fryer grease. Expired December 31, 2009. Second, section 1345 establishes the Small Agri-Biodiesel Producer Credit. This tax credit, valued at 10 cents per gallon of biodiesel produced directly from agricultural crops or livestock fats. Credit can be claimed on the first 15 million US gallons (57,000 m^{3}) and applies to producers with a production capacity below 60 million US gallons (230,000 m^{3}) per year. This credit, as with other biofuel tax credits, is administered by the Internal Revenue Service (IRS). Expired on December 31, 2009. Third, section 1346 established the Renewable Diesel Tax Credit. $1.00 per gallon tax credit per gallon of biomass-based/renewable biodiesel Renewable diesel if produced through different processes. Expired December 31, 2009. Fourth, section 1347 Revises the definition of eligible small ethanol producer for purposes of the tax credit for alcohol used as fuel to increase the limit on a producer's alcohol production capacity from 30,000 to 60,000 US gallons (230,000 L).

==== Title XV – Ethanol and motor fuels ====
===== Subtitle A: General provisions =====
Subtitle A of Title XV addresses ethanol and fuels for motor vehicles. This section created new programs and duties for federal agencies.

The new program created by this Act in Section 1501 of this subtitle was the Renewable Fuel Standard. The Renewable Fuel Standard (RFS) requires the blending of renewable fuels such as ethanol and biodiesel in transportation fuels. It was later expanded upon by the Energy Independence and Security Act of 2007 (Pub. L. 110–140 (text) (PDF)).

For government agencies, Subtitle A requires the Federal Trade Commission (FTC) to report annually to Congress and the Administrator on a market concentration analysis to determine whether there is sufficient competition among ethanol production industry participants to avoid price-setting and other anticompetitive behavior. In addition, Sec. 1506 directs the Administrator to study and report to Congress on the effects of ethanol content in gasoline on permeation, the process by which fuel molecules migrate through the elastomeric materials (rubber and plastic parts) that make up the fuel and fuel vapor systems of a motor vehicle. Subtitle A also addresses the Department of Energy. In Section 1508, this act amends the Department of Energy Organization Act to instruct the Administrator of the Energy Information Administration to survey and publish monthly the renewable fuels demand in the motor vehicle fuels market. Section 1510 of this Act directs the Secretary to establish a program to provide guarantees of loans by private institutions for the construction of facilities for the processing and conversion of municipal solid waste and cellulosic biomass into ethanol fuel and other commercial byproducts.

Subtitle A also addresses existing pieces of legislation. Section 1511 of this Act amends the Clean Air Act (Pub. L. 88–206) in two ways. First, it authorizes funds for certain loan guarantees to implement commercial demonstration projects for cellulosic ethanol and sucrose-derived ethanol. Second, it directs the Secretary of Energy to issue loan guarantees for up to four projects to commercially demonstrate the feasibility and viability of producing cellulosic biomass ethanol or sucrose-derived ethanol (including use of cereal straw and municipal solid waste as a feedstock). The Clean Air Act (Pub. L. 88–206) is further amended but Section 1513. This amends the Clean Air Act (Pub. L. 88–206) to cite circumstances under which it shall not be a violation of the Act for a gasoline retailer to blend, at a retail location, batches of ethanol-blended and non-ethanol-blended reformulated gasoline. Section 1515 amends the Energy Policy Act of 1992 (Pub. L. 102–486) to redefine biodiesel to include biodiesel derived from: (1) animal wastes, including poultry fats and poultry wastes, and other waste materials; or (2) municipal solid waste and sludges and oils derived from wastewater and the treatment of wastewater.

Subtitle A also provides funding opportunities for areas related to biofuels. It provides for the generation of credits:

- (1) By any person that refines, blends, or imports gasoline that contains renewable fuel exceeding the statutory requirement
- (2) For biodiesel
- (3) By small refineries.

Also provided are funding opportunities for research centers and universities. It authorizes appropriations for FY2005-FY2007 for a resource center to develop bioconversion technology using low-cost biomass for the production of ethanol at the Center for Biomass-Based Energy at the Mississippi State University and the Oklahoma State University.

Subtitle A provides instructions for two government agencies to fund research. The first agency addressed is the Environmental Protection Agency, directing the Administrator of the EPA to provide grants for research, development, and implementation of renewable fuel production technologies in specified states with low rates of ethanol production, including low rates of production of cellulosic biomass ethanol. In addition, Section 1514 directs the EPA Administrator to:

- (1) Establish an Advanced Biofuel Technologies Program to demonstrate advanced technologies for the production of alternative transportation fuels,
- (2) Give priority to projects that enhance the geographical diversity of alternative fuels production and utilize feedstocks that represent 10% or less of domestic ethanol or biodiesel fuel production during the previous fiscal year,
- (3) Fund demonstration projects to develop conversion technologies for producing cellulosic biomass ethanol, and for coproducing value-added bioproducts (such as fertilizers, herbicides, and pesticides) resulting from biodiesel fuel production. Authorizes appropriations for FY2005-FY2009.

The second agency addressed is Department of Energy with ways to provide funding. Section 1512 authorizes the Secretary of Energy to provide grants to merchant producers of cellulosic biomass ethanol, waste-derived ethanol, and approved renewable fuels in the United States to assist them in building eligible production facilities for the production of ethanol or approved renewable fuels. Authorizes appropriations for FY2006-FY2008. Also, Section 1516 authorizes funds for, and authorizes the Secretary to issue, loan guarantees to projects to demonstrate commercially the feasibility and viability of producing ethanol using sugarcane, sugarcane bagasse, and other sugarcane byproducts as a feedstock.

== Energy Independence and Security Act of 2007 (EISA 2007) ==
The Energy Independence and Security Act of 2007 (Pub. L. 110–140 (text) (PDF), H.R. 6) is an omnibus energy policy act. Of the sixteen titles contained within EISA four of them can be related to alternative fuels.

=== Title I – Energy security through improved fuel economy ===
Part of promotion of alternative fuels is ensuring consumers understand the applicability of various fuels. This is done supported by EISA Title I which requires that the Secretary of Transportation to promulgate rules to require fuel compartments of alternative fueled vehicles to be labeled to indicate the types of fuels suitable for use in these vehicles, a final rule is to be issued by June 2011.

The Corporate Average Fuel Economy (CAFE) allows automobile producers to receive credits towards CAFE requirements from production of alternative fueled vehicles. EISA Title I amends this program by extending issuance of credits for alternative fueled vehicles through 2019. Additionally, it Allows vehicles operating on a blend of 20% biodiesel and 80% petroleum to be considered for CAFE credits; these vehicles were previously excluded.

=== Title II – Energy security through increased production of biofuels ===
Of particular importance in Title II is the promotion of alternative fuel production much of which is supported by improved funding mechanisms. As such, the Secretary of Energy is to establish a grant program for advanced biofuels which have at least 80% less GHG emissions than current fuels. In addition, Title II authorizes funds to encourage states with low ethanol and cellulosic ethanol production to increase production. and requires the Secretary of Agriculture is to establish a research and development program to promote small-scale production and local on-farm use of biofuels. To monitor these policies effectiveness the Secretary of Energy is required to report to Congress on the challenges to expanding biodiesel and biogas use. Promotion of alternative fuels is also demonstrated through the Renewable Fuel Standard (RFS), which was set in EPAct 2005, in increased by EISA Title II to a total of 9 billion US gallons (34,000,000 m^{3}) in 2008 and 36 billion US gallons (140,000,000 m^{3}) in 2022.

Title II also allows amends the RFS by allowing for inclusion of all transportation fuels, except for those used in oceangoing vessels, to be used to meet these new requirements. Beginning in 2009, an increasing amount of these fuels must be sourced from something other than corn starch with 50% fewer greenhouse gas (GHG) emissions. This requirement is increased to 21 billion US gallons (79,000,000 m^{3}) of advanced biofuel by the year 2022.

To evaluate the influence of the RFS the Secretary of Energy, in cooperation with the Secretary of Agriculture and the Environmental Protection Agency's (EPAs) Administrator, is required to agree with the National Academy of Sciences (NSA) to study the impacts of the RFS on industries related to alternative fuels production and make recommendations to limit adverse economic impacts of the RFS. To evaluate the environmental and resource impacts of the RFS Title II also requires that the administrator of the EPA, the Secretary of Agriculture, and the Secretary of Energy study the effects that the RFS may have on environmental and resource conservation issues and invasive or noxious species.

EISA Title II introduces a number of requirements intended to promote technological advancement. The Secretary of Energy and the EPA Administrator are required to study the effects of biodiesel on engine performance and durability. Additionally, the Secretary of Energy is required to determine if optimization of FFVs would increase fuel efficiency and the potential for running natural gas fueled vehicles with biogas. Also, the EPA Administrator is required to investigate the feasibility of issuing RFS credits for electric vehicles powered by electricity from renewable sources. In addition to requiring these studies to be performed the Secretary of Energy is to establish a competitive grant-awarding program for research on renewable energy technologies at institutes of higher education and report to Congress on progress toward using algae as a biofuel feedstock. Lastly, Section 932 of Pub. L. 109–58 (text) (PDF) is to include research on biorefinery efficiency and conversion to cellulosic material use at existing corn-based ethanol plants while Section 977 of Pub. L. 109–58 (text) (PDF) to include at least seven bioenergy focused research centers.

Evaluation and development of fuel production and distribution infrastructure is also considered in Title II. More specifically, the Secretary of Energy is to conduct research and development on the impact of biofuels on existing fuel transportation infrastructure. Also, the Secretary is to report to Congress on the market penetration of FFVs and the feasibility of requiring installation of E85 infrastructure by retailers and provide grants to expand infrastructure for ethanol/gasoline blends. Title II amends the Petroleum Marketing Practices Act (15 USC 2081) to make it illegal for a franchiser to prohibit installation of E85 or B20 tanks and pumps. > To evaluate transportation infrastructure the Secretary of Energy in cooperation with the Transportation is to report on the adequacy of transportation of domestically produced renewable fuel and, in cooperation with the Secretary of Transportation, report on the feasibility of construction of a dedicated ethanol pipeline.

With the promotion of alternative fuels, concerns arise regarding their impact on the environment. To address these concerns Title II makes a number of specific changes to existing policies. Changes include the extension of EPAs authority under the Clean Air Act (CAA) to control engines, vehicles, fuels, and fuel additives to include effects on water pollution. Additionally, the EPA administrator is to study adverse effects on air quality resulting from the expansion of the RFS and to promulgate regulations to mitigate said effects. Another area of particular interest is greenhouse gas emission reductions and energy consumption during production and use of alternative fuels. As such, EISA Title II requires the Department of Energy (DOE) to expand biological research and development program to include environmental effects, GHG reduction potential, and sustainable agriculture potential. > Furthermore, The Secretary of Energy is to develop tools for evaluating life cycle energy consumption and GHG emissions from biofuels.

In an effort to promote adoption of alternative fuels Title II includes requirements pertaining to consumer information including the establishment of an information center on biofuels and biorefineries by the Secretary of Energy. Also, the Federal Trade Commission (FTC) must promulgate rules requiring retailer to label diesel pumps with percentage of biomass-based diesel for sale.

=== Title V – Energy savings in government and public institutions ===
EISA Title V prohibits federal agencies from procuring transportation fuels if their lifecycle emissions exceed those of petroleum-based fuels.

=== Title VIII – Improved management of energy policy ===
In Title VIII Congress expresses its wish that renewable resources from agriculture and forestry provide at least 25% of all U.S. energy needs.

=== The Food, Conservation, and Energy Act of 2008 (2008 U.S. Farm Bill) ===
The Food, Conservation, and Energy Act of 2008 (Pub. L. 110–234 (text) (PDF)), also called the U.S. Farm Bill, is a five-year agricultural policy bill that was passed into law by the United States Congress on June 18, 2008. The bill was a continuation of the 2002 Farm Bill. It addresses numerous areas, such as energy, and provides increased support for the production of cellulosic ethanol.

==== Title VII – Research and related matters ====
Title VII provides for increased funding for advanced biofuels research through the Agricultural Bioenergy Feedstock and Energy Efficiency Research and Extension Initiative (Section 7207). Additionally, the Sun Grant Program (Section 7526) found in Title VII provides support for and coordinate advanced biofuels research, extension, and development between government agencies, universities, and research institutes.

==== Title IX – Energy ====
Title IX provides for two programs to be implemented including the Biomass Crop Assistance Program (BCAP, Section 9001) and the Biorefinery Assistance Program (Section 9001). The BCAP supports the production of dedicated crop and forest cellulosic feedstocks and provides incentives for harvest and post-production storage and transport. The Biorefinery Assistance Program (Section 9001) provides grants and loans for the development, construction, and retrofitting of commercial-scale refineries to produce biofuels. Also included are requirements for funding and evaluation of these programs. More specifically $1.1 billion in mandatory funding is to be allocated for FY2008 through FY2012. Provisions are in place requiring a series of reports assessing how ethanol production may be impacting the farm economy, environment, and consumer food prices (Section 15322). Studies include:

- Comprehensive Study of Biofuels, to be conducted by USDA, the EPA, and Department of Energy, and the National Academy of Sciences.
- The Biofuels Infrastructure Study by the USDA, DOE, EPA, and Department of Transportation.

==== Title XV – Trade and tax provisions ====
Title XV includes a number of trade and tax provisions including a tax credit of $1.01 per gallon for fuel blenders using certain cellulosic feedstocks. Also included is an amendment to the ethanol blender tax credit for general ethanol, reducing the tax credit from $0.51 to $0.45 per gallon (Section 15331). Finally, Title XV extends ethanol import tariff of $0.54 per gallons from its original expiration date of the end of 2008 to the end of 2010 (Section 15333).

=== Public Law 110-353 ===
Public Law 110-343 is an Act of Congress signed into law by U.S. President George W. Bush on October 3, 2008. The act was designed to mitigate the 2008 financial crisis.

Its formal title is "An Act To provide authority for the Federal Government to purchase and insure certain types of troubled assets for the purposes of providing stability to and preventing disruption in the economy and financial system and protecting taxpayers, to amend the Internal Revenue Code of 1986 to provide incentives for energy production and conservation, to extend certain expiring provisions, to provide individual income tax relief, and for other purposes."

The Act created a $700 billion Troubled Asset Relief Program (TARP). Public Law 110-343 contained three acts, which were classified as divisions of the larger act. These included The Emergency Economic Stabilization Act of 2008 (Division A), the Energy Improvement and Extension Act of 2008 (Division B), and the Tax Extenders and Alternative Minimum Tax Relief Act of 2008 (Division C).

==== Division B: Energy Improvement and Extension Act of 2008 ====
===== Title II – Transportation and domestic fuel security provisions =====
- (Sec. 201) Includes cellulosic biofuel within the definition of biomass ethanol plant property for purposes of the bonus depreciation allowance.
- (Sec. 202) Increases and extends through 2009 income and excise tax credits for biodiesel and renewable diesel used as fuel.
- (Sec. 203) Disqualifies foreign-produced fuel that is used or sold for use outside the United States from the income and excise tax credits for alcohol, biodiesel, and alternative fuel production.
- (Sec. 204) Extends through 2009 the excise tax credit for alternative fuel and fuel mixtures. Requires such fuels to include compressed or liquefied biomass gas and to meet certain carbon capture requirements.
- (Sec. 207) Extends through 2010 the tax credit for alternative fuel vehicle refueling property expenditures. Includes electricity as a clean burning fuel for purposes of such credit.
- (Sec. 208) Provides for the treatment of certain income and gains from alcohol, biodiesel, and alternative fuels and mixtures as qualifying income for publicly traded partnerships.

=== American Recovery and Reinvestment Act of 2009 (The Recovery Act) ===
The American Recovery and Reinvestment Act of 2009, (Pub. L. 111–5 (text) (PDF)), known as the Stimulus or The Recovery Act, is an economic stimulus package enacted by the 111th United States Congress in February 2009. The stimulus was intended to create jobs and promote investment and consumer spending during the recession.

==== Division A: Appropriations provisions ====
===== Title IV – Energy and water =====
Makes supplemental appropriations for FY2009 to the Department of Energy (DOE) for:

- Programs for Energy Efficiency and Renewable Energy
- Electricity Delivery and Energy Reliability
- Fossil Energy Research and Development
- Non-Defense Environmental Cleanup
- The Uranium Enrichment Decontamination and Decommissioning Fund
- Science
- Advanced Research Projects Agency—Energy
- The Title 17 Innovative Technology Loan Guarantee Program
- The Office of the Inspector General
- Defense Environmental Cleanup
- Construction, rehabilitation, operation, and maintenance, Western Area Power Administration.

Section 406 amends the Energy Policy Act of 2005 (Pub. L. 109–58 (text) (PDF)) to set forth a temporary program for rapid deployment of renewable energy and electric power transmission projects. Restricts federal guarantees to: (1) specified renewable energy systems; (2) electric power transmission systems; and (3) leading edge biofuel projects that will use technologies performing at the pilot or demonstration scale that are likely to become commercial and will produce transportation fuels that substantially reduce life-cycle greenhouse gas emissions compared to other transportation fuels.

==== Division B: Tax, unemployment, health, state fiscal relief, and other provisions ====
===== Title I – Tax provisions =====
====== =Part I: Renewable energy incentives= ======
Section 1101 extends for three years the tax credit for producing electricity from wind, biomass, geothermal or solar, solid waste, and qualified hydropower facilities. Extends such credit for two years for marine and hydrokinetic renewable energy resources.

====== =Part III: Energy conservation incentives= ======
Section 1123 increases in 2009 and 2010 the tax credit for residential and commercial alternative fuel vehicle refueling property expenditures.

== Proposals in the 112th Congress on the United States ==
=== Bills in the House of Representatives ===
==== H.R.230 – 21st Century Energy Independence Act of 2011 ====
- Sponsor: Rep Jackson Lee, Sheila [TX-18] (introduced 1/7/2011)
- Latest Major Action: 2/10/2011 Referred to House subcommittee. Status: Referred to the Subcommittee on Energy and Environment.
- Summary:
  - 21st Century Energy Independence Act of 2011– Instructs the Secretary of Energy (DOE) to seek to ensure: (1) the availability of 200% of the volume of renewable fuels required to be available in the United States by 2013 under the Energy Policy Act of 2005 (Pub. L. 109–58 (text) (PDF)); and (2) the reduction of carbon dioxide emissions from the production and use of renewable fuels by 25%.
  - Directs the Secretary to establish a loan guarantee program for up to 80% of the cost of a project for: (1) the harvesting, storing, and delivery of agriculture residues for use in cellulosic or traditional ethanol production plants; (2) cellulosic ethanol production technologies that will reduce the initial capital cost to $2.50 per annual gallon, and operation and maintenance costs to 125% of those at traditional corn ethanol plants; (3) advanced biomass gasifiers that can provide specified thermal input requirements for traditional ethanol plants to produce syngas; and (4) scaled catalytic conversion projects to convert syngas to liquid fuels.
  - Permits such loan guarantees for: (1) a traditional ethanol plant only if the agriculture residue products are used as feedstock to replace thermal input requirements otherwise provided by fossil fuels; and (2) an existing ethanol plant only if the applicant demonstrates the potential to reduce carbon dioxide emissions related to ethanol production by at least 75%.
  - Authorizes the Secretary to provide grants for up to 50% of the capital costs of the initial commercialization for certain cellulosic ethanol production technologies.

==== H.R.404 – Renewable Fuels for America's Future Act of 2011 ====
- Sponsor: Rep Fortenberry, Jeff [NE-1] (introduced 1/24/2011)
- Related Bills: S.152
- Latest Major Action: 2/1/2011 Referred to House subcommittee. Status: Referred to the Subcommittee on Energy and Power.
- Summary:
  - /home/LegislativeData.php Renewable Fuels for America's Future Act of 2011 – Amends the Internal Revenue Code to: (1) require a reduction in the income and excise tax credits for alcohol used for fuel by the amount of alcohol used to meet the taxpayer's renewable fuel obligation under the Clean Air Act; and (2) extend such credits and payments for alcohol fuel mixtures through 2016.
  - Amends the Harmonized Tariff Schedule of the United States to extend until 2017 the additional tariff on ethyl alcohol blends (ethanol) used as fuel.
  - Requires automobile manufacturers to ensure that at least 50% of 2013 and 2014 model year automobiles and light duty trucks manufactured for sale in the United States are dual fueled. Increases the minimum to 90% for later model years. (Excludes automobiles and light duty trucks that operate only on electricity.)
  - Requires the Secretary of Energy to make grants to eligible facilities to pay the federal share of: (1) installing blender pump fuel infrastructure, including infrastructure necessary for the direct retail sale of ethanol fuel blends (including E-85 fuel) and to directly market such fuels to gas retailers; and (2) providing subgrants to direct retailers of such fuels for the installation of fuel infrastructure for the direct retail sale of such fuels. Defines: (1) "E-85 fuel" as a blend of gasoline at least 85% derived from ethanol; and (2) "ethanol fuel blend" as a blend of gasoline and ethanol, with a minimum of 0% and a maximum of 85% derived from denatured ethanol.
  - Requires the Secretary to promulgate regulations to ensure that each major fuel distributor that sells or introduces gasoline into commerce in the United States through majority-owned stations or branded stations installs one or more blender pumps that dispense E-85 fuel and ethanol fuel blends at specified minimum percentages of such stations for specified years in each state. Allows major fuel distributors to earn and sell credits if they exceed such percentages.

==== H.R.684 – To amend the Internal Revenue Code of 1986 to modify the incentives for the production of biodiesel. ====
- Sponsor: Rep Hirono, Mazie K. [HI-2] (introduced 2/14/2011)
- Cosponsor: Rep Johnson, Timothy V. [IL-15] – 2/14/2011
- Latest Major Action: 2/14/2011 Referred to House committee. Status: Referred to the House Committee on Ways and Means.
- /home/LegislativeData.php To Amend the Internal Revenue Code of 1986 to Modify the Incentives for the Production of Biodiesel. Amends the Internal Revenue Code to revise the income and excise tax credits for biodiesel used as fuel to: (1) allow a $1.00 tax credit for each gallon of biodiesel produced; (2) provide for an increased income tax credit for small biodiesel producers; (3) revise the definitions of "biodiesel" and "small biodiesel producer"; (4) treat renewable diesel in the same manner as biodiesel for income tax purposes; and (5) treat biodiesel as a taxable fuel for excise tax purposes. Extends the biodiesel income and excise tax credits through December 31, 2016.

==== /home/LegislativeData.php H.R.1149 – To amend the Clean Air Act to include algae-based biofuel in the renewable fuel program and amend the Internal Revenue Code of 1986 to include algae-based biofuel in the cellulosic biofuel producer credit. ====
- Sponsor: Rep Bilbray, Brian P. [CA-50] (introduced 3/17/2011)
- Cosponsors:
  - Rep Bartlett, Roscoe G. [MD-6] – 3/17/2011
  - Rep Bono Mack, Mary [CA-45] – 3/17/2011
  - Rep Carnahan, Russ [MO-3] – 3/17/2011
  - Rep Davis, Susan A. [CA-53] – 3/17/2011
  - Rep Dreier, David [CA-26] – 3/17/2011
  - Rep Hunter, Duncan D. [CA-52] – 3/17/2011
  - Rep Inslee, Jay [WA-1] – 3/17/2011
- Latest Major Action: 3/17/2011 Referred to House committee. Status: Referred to the Committee on Ways and Means, and in addition to the Committee on Energy and Commerce, for a period to be subsequently determined by the Speaker, in each case for consideration of such provisions as fall within the jurisdiction of the committee concerned.

=== Bills in the Senate ===
==== S.152 – Dual Fuel Vehicle Act of 2011 ====
The Dual Fuel Vehicle Act of 2011 was introduced to Congress on January 25, 2011. This act requires automobile manufacturers to ensure that at least 50% of automobiles and light duty trucks manufactured for sale in the United States are dual fueled (capable of operating on alternative fuel and on gasoline or diesel fuel or a mixture of biodiesel and diesel fuel). This requirement is increased to 90% duel fueled vehicles for later model years. Automobiles and light duty trucks that operate only on electricity are excluded from these requirements.

- Sponsor: Sen Lugar, Richard G. [IN] (introduced 1/25/2011)
- Related Bills: H.R.404
- Latest Major Action: 1/25/2011 Referred to Senate committee. Status: Read twice and referred to the Committee on Commerce, Science, and Transportation.

==== S.187 – Biofuels Market Expansion Act of 2011 ====
Biofuels Market Expansion Act of 2011

- Sponsor: Sen Harkin, Tom [IA] (introduced 1/25/2011)
- Cosponsors
  - Sen Franken, Al [MN] – 1/25/2011
  - Sen Johnson, Tim [SD] – 1/25/2011
  - Sen Klobuchar, Amy [MN] – 1/25/2011
- Latest Major Action: 1/25/2011 Referred to Senate committee. Status: Read twice and referred to the Committee on Energy and Natural Resources.
- Summary of Bill
  - Biofuels Market Expansion Act of 2011 – Requires automobile manufacturers to ensure that at least 50% of 2014 and 2015 model year automobiles and light duty trucks manufactured for sale in the United States are dual fueled. Increases the minimum to 90% for 2016 and subsequent model years. (Excludes automobiles and light duty trucks that operate only on electricity.)
  - Requires the Secretary of Energy (DOE) to make grants to eligible facilities to pay the federal share of: (1) installing blender pump fuel infrastructure, including infrastructure necessary for the direct retail sale of ethanol fuel blends (including E-85 fuel); and (2) providing subgrants to direct retailers of such fuels for the installation of such infrastructure. Prohibits a major fuel distributor (any person that owns a refinery or that directly markets the output of a refinery through more than 49 retail fueling stations) from being eligible for such grants or subgrants.
  - Amends the Clean Air Act to revise the renewable fuel program to require the Secretary to promulgate regulations to ensure that each major fuel distributor that sells or introduces gasoline into commerce in the United States through majority-owned stations or branded stations installs one or more blender pumps that dispense E-85 fuel and ethanol fuel blends at: (1) an overall percentage of such stations increasing from 10% in 2014 to 50% in 2020; and (2) a specified minimum percentage of such stations in each state. Allows such distributors to earn credits if they exceed such percentages and to sell such credits to other distributors, except for use to fulfill the state distribution requirement.
  - Amends the Energy Policy Act of 2005 to make renewable fuel pipelines eligible for loan guarantees for projects that avoid, reduce, or sequester air pollutants or anthropogenic emissions of greenhouse gases and employ new or significantly improved technologies as compared to commercial technologies in service in the United States at the time the guarantee is issued.
  - Amends the temporary program for rapid deployment of renewable energy and electric power transmission projects to make eligible for loan guarantees projects for the installation of sufficient infrastructure to allow for the cost-effective deployment of clean energy technologies appropriate to each region of the United States.

== Federal programs ==
=== Renewable fuel Standard ===
One of the many policy tools used to promote biofuel fuels is a minimum renewable fuel usage requirement. In the United States, this usage requirement is known as the Renewable Fuel Standard (RFS), whereby a minimum volume of biofuels is to be used in the national transportation fuel supply each year. Congress established the RFS in Title XV, Subtitle A, Section 1501 of the Energy Policy Act of 2005 (Pub. L. 109–58 (text) (PDF)). This initial RFS (referred to as RFS1) mandated that a minimum of 4 billion US gallons (15,000,000 m^{3}) be used in 2006, and that this minimum usage volume rise to 7.5 billion US gallons (28,000,000 m^{3}) by 2012. Two years later, Congress passed the Energy Independence and Security Act of 2007 (Pub. L. 110–140 (text) (PDF)) The provisions in the act amended the provisions in EPAct 2005 and expanded the biofuels blending mandate. The expanded RFS (referred to as RFS2)required the annual use of 9 billion US gallons (34,000,000 m^{3}) of biofuels in 2008 and expanded the mandate to 36 billion gallons annually in 2022. The Act included the provision that of the 36 billion US gallons (140,000,000 m^{3}) used, no more than 15 billion US gallons (57,000,000 m^{3}) could be corn-based ethanol. In addition, of the 36 billion US gallons (140,000,000 m^{3}), no less than 16 billion must be from cellulosic biofuels. The act also contained provisions setting usage requirements for biodiesel.

Congress delegated the powers of establishing and implementing regulations relating to the RFS to the Environmental Protection Agency (EPA). The EPA is responsible for ensuring that the nation's transportation fuel supply contains the mandated biofuel volumes. EPA's initial regulations for administering RFS1 (issued in April 2007) established detailed compliance standards for fuel suppliers, a tracking system based on renewable identification numbers (RINs) with credit verification and trading, special treatment of small refineries, and general waiver provisions. EPA rules for administering RFS2 (issued in February 2010) built upon the earlier RFS1 regulations, but with four major distinctions:

- (1) Mandated volumes are greatly expanded and the time frame over which the volumes ramp up is extended through at least 2022.
- (2) The total renewable fuel requirement is divided into four separate, but nested categories—total renewable fuels, advanced biofuels, biomass-based diesel, and cellulosic ethanol—each with its own volume requirement.
- (3) Biofuels qualifying under each category must achieve certain minimum thresholds of lifecycle greenhouse gas (GHG) emission reductions, with certain exceptions applicable to existing facilities.
- (4) All renewable fuel must be made from feedstocks that meet a new definition of renewable biomass, including certain land use restrictions.

With the expansion of the RFS under EISA 2007 came a system for categorizing biofuels. Each category has a specific volume mandate and lifecycle GHG emission reduction threshold. These categories are also subject to strict biomass feedstock criteria.

- Total Renewable Fuels: The total volumetric amount of biofuels mandated, which grows from nearly 13 billion US gallons (49,000,000 m^{3}) in 2010 to 36 billion US gallons (140,000,000 m^{3}) in 2022. Most biofuels, including corn-starch ethanol, fall into this category and must meet a lifecycle GHG emission reduction of 20%. Provisions state that the volume of corn-starch ethanol included under the RFS cannot exceed 12 billion US gallons (45,000,000 m^{3}) in 2010. The cap grows to 15 billion US gallons (57,000,000 m^{3}) by 2015 and is fixed thereafter.
- Advanced Biofuels: Part of the Total Renewable Fuels, this category includes biofuels produced from non-corn feedstocks. This can include sources such as grains like sorghum and wheat, imported Brazilian sugarcane ethanol, as well as biomass-based biodiesel and biofuels from cellulosic materials. Advanced biofuels must reduce lifecycle GHG emissions by 50%. The mandate grows from nearly 1 billion US gallons (3,800,000 m^{3}) in 2010 to 21 billion US gallons (79,000,000 m^{3}) in 2022.
- Cellulosic and Agricultural Waste-Based Biofuel: Part of the Total Renewable Fuels, this category 100 million US gallons (380,000 m^{3}) in 2010 to 16 billion US gallons (61,000,000 m^{3}) in 2022. Cellulosic biofuels must reduce lifecycle GHG emissions by at least 60% to qualify. Cellulosic biofuels are renewable fuels derived from cellulose, hemicellulose, or lignin. This includes cellulosic biomass ethanol as well as any biomass-to-liquid fuel such as cellulosic gasoline or diesel.
- Biomass-based biodiesel. Part of the Total Renewable Fuels, this category grows from 0.5 billion US gallons (1,900,000 m^{3}) in 2009 to 1 billion US gallons (3,800,000 m^{3}) in 2012. Qualifying biofuels include any diesel fuel made from biomass feedstocks including biodiesel (mono-alkyl esters) and non-ester renewable diesel (cellulosic diesel). The lifecycle GHG emissions reduction threshold is 50%.

EISA changed the definition of renewable fuel to require that it be made from feedstocks that qualify as "renewable biomass." This includes not just the types of feedstocks that can be used, but also the land that these feedstocks are grown on. EISA excludes new farm land cultivated after December 19, 2007, as well as tree crops, tree residues, biomass materials obtained from federal lands, and range land. Existing agricultural land includes three land categories: cropland, pastureland, and Conservation Reserve Program (CRP) land. The EPA determined that fuels produced from five categories of feedstocks qualify as renewable biomass:

- (1) Crop residues such as corn stover, wheat straw, rice straw, citrus residue;
- (2) Forest material including eligible forest thinnings and solid residue remaining from forest product production;
- (3) Secondary annual crops planted on existing cropland, such as winter cover crops;
- (4) Separated food and yard waste, including biogenic waste from food processing;
- (5) Perennial grasses, including switchgrass and miscanthus.

As part of its final rule determination, the EPA included an analysis of the market and environmental impact of the increased use of renewable fuels under the RFS2 standards. The results include:

- Reduced Dependence on Foreign Sources of Crude Oil: By 2022, the mandated 36 billion US gallons (140,000,000 m^{3}) of renewable fuel will displace about 13.6 billion US gallons (51,000,000 m^{3}) of petroleum-based gasoline and diesel fuel, representing about 7% of expected annual U.S. transportation fuel consumption.
- Reduced Price of Domestic Transportation Fuels: By 2022, the increased use of renewable fuels is expected to decrease gasoline costs by $0.024 per gallon and diesel costs by $0.121 per gallon, producing a combined annual savings of nearly $12 billion.
- Reduced GHG Emissions: When fully implemented in 2022, the expanded use of biofuels under the RFS is expected to reduce annual GHG emissions by 138 million metric tons. This is equivalent to taking about 27 million vehicles off the road.
- Increased U.S. Farm Income: By 2022, the expanded market for agricultural products such as corn and soybeans resulting from biofuels production is expected to increase annual net farm income by $13 billion.
- Decreased Corn and soybean exports: The expanded use of corn starch and soybean oil for biofuels is expected to reduce corn exports by 8% and soybean exports by 14% by 2022.
- Increased Cost of Food in the United States: The increased demand for U.S. agricultural products is expected to raise the overall commodity price structure, leading to an annual increase in the cost of food per capita of about $10 by 2022, or over $3 billion.
- Increased Emissions of Certain Air Contaminants, But Decreased Emissions of Others: Contaminants expected to increase include hydrocarbons, nitrogen oxides (NOx), acetaldehyde, and ethanol; those expected to decrease include carbon monoxide (CO) and benzene. The effects are expected to vary widely across regions, but in the net, increases in population-weighted annual average ambient PM and ozone concentrations are anticipated to lead to up to 245 cases of adult premature mortality.

The RFS is subject to arguments both for and against the policy. Supporters of the RFS claim it serves several public policy interests. The RFS reduces the risk of investing in renewable biofuels by guaranteeing demand for a projected period. It enhances U.S. energy security by promoting production of a liquid fuel from renewable, domestic sources. This, in turn, results in a decreased reliance on imported fossil fuels. The RFS acts as a boost to the US agricultural sector by providing an additional source of demand for U.S. agricultural products, and increases rural incomes and rural employment opportunities. Supporters argue that renewable biofuels go unrecognized for the full extent of their environmental benefits. Unlike gasoline and gasoline additives, biofuels are non-toxic and biodegradable, and emit substantially lower volumes of direct greenhouse gases than fossil fuels when produced, harvested, and processed under the right circumstances.

The RFS has received a fair amount of criticism, particularly of the EISA expansion of the original RFS. Opponents argue that by picking the biofuels as a sort of "winner" alternative fuel, policymakers may exclude or slowed down the development of other, potentially preferable alternative energy sources. Critics contend that biofuels are given an advantage through the billions of dollars of annual subsidies. This distorts the market and investment incentives, redirecting venture capital and other investment dollars away from competing alternative energy sources. Instead, these critics have argued for a more "technology-neutral" policy. The argument also states that continued large federal incentives for ethanol production are no longer necessary since the sector is no longer in its "economic infancy" and would have been profitable during much of 2006 and 2007 without federal subsidies. The expanded mandate could have substantial unintended consequences in other areas of policy importance, including energy/petroleum security, pollutant and greenhouse gas emissions, agricultural commodity and food markets, land use patterns, and soil and water quality and conservation. Though biofuels are a liquid fuel that can be incorporated into the current storage, distribution, and pumping infrastructure, the ability to do so has its limits. Biofuels have a number of properties that will make it difficult to fully and effectively incorporate them into the gasoline infrastructure and vehicle fleet. Biofuels can differ from gasoline in a number of ways, depending on the particular fuel: lower energy content, different physical and combustion characteristics, and corrosive properties. These differences would require modifications to current infrastructure and vehicle design. Opponents also argue that taxpayers are being asked to finance ever-increasing biofuels subsidies that have the potential to affect future federal budgetary choices.

=== Biomass Crop Assistance Program (BCAP) ===
In the Renewable Fuel Standard (RFS), the federal government set up a program to guarantee a demand for biofuels and thus promote the biofuels industry. This demand can only be met if there is a steady, readily available supply of biomass feedstocks for producing biofuels. In the Food, Conservation, and Energy Act of 2008 (Pub. L. 110–234 (text) (PDF)), the federal government created a program to help guarantee this supply, called the Biomass Crop Assistance Program (BCAP). As with the RFS, investors in the market are reluctant to place money in a currently unproven technology, or are reluctant to dedicate other resources to some endeavor, without a guarantee of a market to sell the eventual products. Such technologies and resources include the ability to convert cellulosic biomass to biofuels and cropland for feedstocks.

The Biomass Crop Assistance Program (BCAP) was created for two purposes:

- (1) To support the establishment and production of eligible crops for conversion to bioenergy in selected areas
- (2) To assist agricultural and forest land owners and operators with collection, harvest, storage, and transportation of eligible material for use in a biomass conversion facility.

One of the difficulties associated with bioenergy is the need for a steady supply of biomass feedstocks. The BCAP was created with the intention of helping to relieve this problem.

In 2009, the U.S. Department of Agriculture began to implement the program. In June 2009, the USDA's Farm Service Agency (FSA) began the Collection, Harvest, Storage, and Transportation (CHST) payment portion of BCAP with a Notice of Funds Availability in the Federal Register. On February 8, 2010, the USDA began the rulemaking process for implementing of the rest of the BCAP program. On October 27, 2010, the USDA issued the BCAP final rule which will implement both components of the program. Payment for these components are split into two forms:

- (1) Annual and Establishment Payments, which share in the cost of establishing eligible biomass crops and maintaining production
- (2) Matching Payments, which share in the cost of the collection, harvest, storage, and transportation of biomass to an eligible biomass conversion facility.

Annual and Establishment Payments: Created to assist producers with establishing new dedicated biomass crops for bioenergy production and to cover any lost income and additional risk from shifting away from traditional crop production. This includes such things as clearing, planting, and seeding new, purely feedstock crops. Annual payments would be made to eligible producers of biomass crops within a specific project area. Establishment payments would cover the cost associated with establishing these crops within a project area.

Matching Payments: Created to provide incentives for collecting underutilized biomass for bioenergy production. This would remove existing biomass where it might not currently be profitable to do so, such as from crop residue or forest undergrowth. Through a matching payment, USDA would pay dollar-for-dollar, up to $45 per ton, of the price to collect, harvest, store, and transport eligible material to biomass conversion facilities. The payments have different eligibility and sign-up requirements, payment rates, and contract length.

== State laws ==
There are a number of states that have implemented laws and programs to influence the economics of alternative fuel production and market penetration. As of 2006, Demand for agriculture-based renewable energy is being promoted in part by state Renewable Portfolio Standards (RPS) which require utilities to produce a percentage of their energy from renewable sources. As of January 2006, 34 states had implemented RPSs requiring, at a minimum, that state vehicles utilize certain volumes or percentages of renewable fuels. Some states have taken the RPS a step further and applied it to all motor vehicles within a state. In addition to the large legislative documents dealing with biofuels there are also many rules and regulations created by federal agencies dealing specifically with biofuel development, creation, infrastructure, economy, efficiency, supply, and types of biofuel.

=== Tax credits ===
Several states have tax credits specifically geared towards selling and buying more ethanol and biodiesel. These can be applied to producers trying to make more biofuels and give them bonuses to sell more fuel. They can also be given to buyers to reduce prices at the pump. Since there are only a couple significant federally mandated tax credits for biofuels many states have their own set of incentives. Table 1: The different types of tax credits from different states, as noted from the Department of Energy's State Incentives for Biodiesel database.

| Alabama | Biofuel Production Facility Tax Credit |
| California | Low Emission Vehicle Incentives |
| Colorado | Alternative Fuel Infrastructure Tax Credit |
| Delaware | Alternative Fuel Tax Exemption |
| Florida | Alternative Fuels Production Incentive, Hydrogen and Biofuels Investment Tax Credit, Excise Tax Exemption for Biodiesel Production at Schools |
| Georgia | Alternative Fuels Production Assistance |
| Hawaii | Business Investment Tax Credit |
| Idaho | Biofuel Fueling Infrastructure Tax Credit, Exemptions for Biodiesel Production for Personal Use, Alternative Fuels Tax Refund |
| Illinois | Alternative Fuel Vehicle (AFV) and Alternative Fuel Rebates, Alternative Fuel Vehicle (AFV) Fleet Incentives, Biodiesel Tax Exemption |
| Indiana | Biodiesel Production Tax Credit, Biodiesel Blending Tax Credit, Biodiesel Blend Tax Exemption, Biodiesel Price Preference, Biodiesel Blend Tax Exemption |
| Iowa | Biodiesel Tax Credit, Alternative Fuel Production Tax Credits, |
| Kansas | Alternative Fuel Vehicle (AFV) Tax Credit, Alternative Fueling Infrastructure Tax Credit, Renewable Fuel Retailer Incentive, Biofuel Blending Equipment Tax Incentives, Biofuel Blending Equipment Tax Exemption, Biodiesel Production Incentive |
| Kentucky | Biodiesel Production and Blending Tax Credit, Alternative Fuel Production Tax Incentives |
| Louisiana | Alternative Fuel Vehicle (AFV) and Fueling Infrastructure Tax Credit, Green Jobs Tax Credit, Biodiesel Equipment and Fuel Tax Exemption |
| Maine | Biofuels Production Tax Credit, Biodiesel Fuel Tax Exemption |
| Maryland | Biofuels Production Incentive |
| Michigan | Alternative Fueling Infrastructure Tax Credit, Alternative Fuel and Vehicle Research, Development, and Manufacturing Tax Credits, Reduced Biofuels Tax, Alternative Fuel Development Property Tax Exemption |
| Mississippi | Biofuels Production Incentive |
| Missouri | Alternative Fueling Infrastructure Tax Credit, Biodiesel Production Incentive, Biodiesel Fuel Use Incentive, State Fleet Biodiesel Fuel Use Incentive |
| Montana | Biodiesel Blending Tax Credit, Biodiesel Production Facility Tax Credit, Biodiesel Tax Refund, Alternative Fuel Vehicle (AFV) Conversion Tax Credit, Renewable Energy Property Tax Incentive, Biodiesel Tax Exemption |
| Nebraska | Biodiesel Production Investment Tax Credit, Ethanol and Biodiesel Tax Exemption |
| New Mexico | Biodiesel Blend Tax Credit, Biodiesel Blending Facility Tax Credit, Biofuels Production Tax Deduction, Alternative Fuel Tax Exemption |
| New York | Biofuel Production Tax Credit |
| North Carolina | Renewable Fuel Production Facility Tax Credit, Renewable Energy Property Tax Credit, Alternative Fuel Tax Exemption, Biodiesel Tax Exemption, Bond Exemption for Small Biofuels Suppliers |
| North Dakota | Biodiesel Blender Tax Credit, Biodiesel Sales Equipment Tax Credit, Biodiesel Production and Blending Equipment Tax Credit, Biodiesel Equipment Tax Exemption, Agriculturally-Based Fuel Production Wage and Salary Tax Credit |
| Ohio | Biofuels Retail Tax Credit |
| Oklahoma | Biodiesel Production Tax Credit, Biofuels Tax Exemption, |
| Oregon | Biofuels Use Tax Credit, Alternative Fuel Vehicle (AFV) and Fueling Infrastructure Tax Credit for Businesses, Alternative Fuel Production Tax Credit, Biofuels Production Property Tax Exemption |
| Pennsylvania | Alternative Fuel Production Tax Credits, Biodiesel Production Refund |
| Rhode Island | Biodiesel Tax Exemption |
| South Carolina | Biofuels Retail Incentive, Biofuels Production Tax Credit, Biofuels Research and Development Tax Credit, Biofuels Distribution Infrastructure Tax Credit, Biofuels Production Facility Tax Credit |
| South Dakota | Biodiesel Blend Tax Credit, Tax Refund for Methanol Used in Biodiesel Production |
| Tennessee | Biodiesel Production Incentive |
| Texas | Ethanol and Biodiesel Blend Tax Exemption |
| Vermont | Alternative Fuel and Advanced Vehicle Research and Development Tax Credit |
| Virginia | Biodiesel Production Tax Credit, Green Jobs Tax Credit, Registration Exemption for Biofuel Feedstock |
| Washington | Biofuels Distribution Tax Exemption, Biofuels Tax Deduction, Biofuels Production Tax Exemption, Biodiesel Feedstock Tax Exemption |
| West Virginia | Alternative Fuel School Bus Incentive |
| Wisconsin | Renewable Fuel InfrastructureTax Credit, Renewable Fuel Producer Excise Tax and Inspection Exemption, Alternative Fuel Tax Exemption, Biodiesel Fuel Use Incentive |

=== Grants ===
Many states have money set aside to specifically encourage the research of biofuels with the goals of increasing fuel efficiency and cost effectiveness. This money is given out in the form of grants and is usually awarded to universities, private companies, and government facilities conducting research on biofuels. These grants differ greatly by state.

Table 2: Grants and grant programs awarded to groups in each state from the US DOE database on Biodiesel Incentives and Laws

| Alabama | Biofuels for Schools Grants |
| Arizona | Biofuel Infrastructure Grants |
| Arkansas | Alternative Fuel Grants |
| California | Alternative Fuel and Vehicle Research and Development Incentives, Low Emissions School Bus Grants, Employer Invested Emissions Reduction Funding |
| Colorado | Biofuels Research Grants |
| Connecticut | Biodiesel Production and Distribution Grants, Biofuels Support, School Bus Retrofit Program |
| Florida | Renewable Energy Grants |
| Georgia | Alternative Fuels Production Assistance |
| Illinois | Biofuels Production Facility Grants, Clean School Bus Program |
| Indiana | Vehicle Research and Development Grants |
| Iowa | Biofuels Infrastructure Grants, Alternative Fuel Loan Program, Alternative Fuel Production Loans, Alternative Fuel Research and Development Funding |
| Kentucky | Alternative Fuel Research, Development, and Promotion, Alternative Fuel and Vehicle Promotion |
| Michigan | Alternative Fueling Infrastructure Grants |
| Minnesota | Biodiesel Fueling Infrastructure Grants, Alternative Fuel and Technology Grants |
| New Hampshire | Vehicle and Fueling Infrastructure Project Funding |
| New Mexico | Alternative Fuel Vehicle (AFV) and Fueling Infrastructure Grants |
| New York | Biofuel Fueling Infrastructure Funding, Alternative Fuel Bus and Infrastructure Funding, Alternative Fuel Vehicle (AFV) and Fueling Infrastructure Funding, Alternative Fuel Vehicle (AFV) Technical Assistance, Alternative Fuel Vehicle (AFV) and Fueling Infrastructure Technical Assistance, Alternative Fuel Product Development Funding |
| North Carolina | Biofuels Commercialization Grants, Biofuels Industry Development Grants, Alternative Fuel and Idle Reduction Grants, Alternative Fuel Vehicle (AFV) and Hybrid Electric Vehicle (HEV) Support, Alternative Fuel and Alternative Fuel Vehicle (AFV) Fund |
| North Dakota | Biofuels Infrastructure Grants, Biofuels Loan Program |
| Ohio | Biofuels Development Funding, School Bus Retrofit Grant Program, Alternative Fuel and Fueling Infrastructure Grants |
| Oklahoma | Alternative Fuel Vehicle (AFV) and Fueling Infrastructure Loans, Alternative Fuel Vehicle (AFV) Loans |
| Oregon | Alternative Fuel Loans |
| Pennsylvania | Alternative Fuel Vehicle (AFV), Hybrid Electric Vehicle (HEV), and Fueling Infrastructure Funding, Renewable Energy Grants |
| Tennessee | Biofuel Fueling Infrastructure Grants, Biofuel Innovations Grants |
| Texas | Clean Vehicle and Infrastructure Grants, Alternative Fuel and Advanced Vehicle Grants, Ethanol, Biodiesel, and Renewable Diesel Production Grants |
| Vermont | Agricultural Economic Development Plan for Biofuels |
| Virginia | Biofuels Production Grants, Alternative Fuels Grants and Loans, Alternative Fuel Vehicle (AFV) and Fueling Infrastructure Loans |
| Washington | Alternative Fuel Loans and Grants |

=== State regulations ===
In addition to grants and tax incentives several states have other laws to encourage the use and production of biofuels. Many of these other laws require some type of conversion to alternative fuels for state vehicle fleets, or require some percentage of fuel within a state to come from a renewable source.

Table 3: The various laws and regulations dealing with biofuel standards, state fleets, and other alternative fuels, as pulled from the US DOE's database for state Laws and Incentives for Biodiesel. An "etc." denotes more than 4 specific laws and regulations

| Alabama | Fuel-Efficient Green Fleets Policy, Biodiesel Use in School Buses and Government Vehicles, Interagency Alternative Fuels Working Group, etc. |
| Alaska | Alternative Fuel Vehicle Acquisition Requirement, Global Warming Mitigation Initiative |
| Arizona | Biofuels Definitions and Specifications, Clean Fuel Contracts for Heavy-Duty Equipment, State Alternative Fuel Vehicle (AFV) Acquisition Requirements, etc. |
| Arkansas | Alternative Fuel Vehicle (AFV) Conversion, Biodiesel Use Requirement, Alternative Fuels Tax |
| California | Low Carbon Fuel Standard, State Transportation Plan, Low Emission Vehicle (LEV) Standards, etc. |
| Colorado | Alternative Fuel Vehicle (AFV) Registration, Clean Energy Development Authority, Promulgation of Renewable Fuel Storage Tank Regulations, etc. |
| Connecticut | Alternative Fuel and Fuel-Efficient Vehicle Acquisition and Emissions Reduction Requirements, School Bus Emissions Reduction |
| Delaware | State Agency Energy Plan, Alternative Fuel and Advanced Vehicle Acquisition Requirements |
| Florida | Alternative Fuel Economic Development, Fuel-Efficient Vehicle Acquisition and Alternative Fuel Use Requirements, Biofuels Promotion, etc. |
| Georgia | Alternative Fuel Use and Alternative Fuel Vehicle (AFV) Acquisition Requirements, Biodiesel Specifications, Motor Fuel Excise Tax |
| Hawaii | Alternative Fuel Development Support, Alternative Fuel and Advanced Vehicle Acquisition Requirements, Alternative Fuels Promotion, etc. |
| Idaho | Biodiesel Definitions |
| Illinois | Fuel-Efficient Vehicle Acquisition Goals, Alternative Fuel Promotion, Biofuels Production Promotion, etc. |
| Indiana | Regional Biofuels Promotion Plan, Biodiesel Definition, Biofuels Blend Use Requirement, etc. |
| Iowa | Renewable Fuels Promotion and Education, Renewable Fuel Replacement Goal, Renewable Fuel Labeling Requirement, etc. |
| Kansas | Biofuels Use Requirement, Regional Biofuels Promotion Plan, Biodiesel and Renewable Fuel Definitions |
| Kentucky | Biomass and Biofuels Industry Development, Vehicle Acquisition Priorities and Alternative Fuel Use Requirement, State Energy Plan Alternative Fuel Requirements |
| Louisiana | Authorization for Alternative Fuel Vehicle (AFV) Loans, Renewable Fuel Standard, Biofuels Feedstock Requirements |
| Maine | Policy Recommendations for Biofuels Promotion, Transportation Efficiency Fund, Provision for Establishment of Clean Fuel Vehicle Insurance Incentives |
| Maryland | Alternative Fuel Use Requirement |
| Massachusetts | Biodiesel Blend Mandate, Voluntary Biofuels Program, Hybrid Electric (HEV) Alternative Fuel Vehicle (AFV) Acquisition Requirements, etc. |
| Michigan | Vehicle Research and Development Promotion, Regional Biofuels Promotion Plan, Biofuels Blender Requirements, etc. |
| Minnesota | Biodiesel Blend Mandate, Biofuels Promotion, Biofuel Use Requirement, etc. |
| Mississippi | Fuel-Efficient and Alternative Fuel Vehicle Use, Biodiesel and Renewable Diesel Definitions, Registration, and Labeling Requirements, State Employee Travel Policy |
| Missouri | Alternative Fuel Vehicle (AFV) Acquisition and Alternative Fuel Use Requirements, Biodiesel Use Requirement, Alternative Fuel Vehicle (AFV) Decal, Alternative Fuel Promotion |
| Montana | Biofuels Promotion, Alternative Fuel Promotion |
| Nebraska | Alternative Fuel Use, Biotechnology and Advanced Biofuels Strategic Plan, Regional Biofuels Corridor |
| Nevada | Biodiesel Producer Requirements, Alternative Fuel Use in County School Districts, Funds for School District Alternative Fuel Use, etc. |
| New Hampshire | Alternative Fuel and Advanced Vehicle Study, Biodiesel Blend Purchase Requirement, Biodiesel Study Commission, etc. |
| New Jersey | High Occupancy Vehicle (HOV) Lane Exemption, Low Emission or Alternative Fuel Bus Acquisition Requirement |
| New Mexico | Biodiesel Blend Mandate, Green Jobs Training Program, Biofuels Strategic Plan, etc. |
| New York | Fuel Exclusivity Contract Regulation, Alternative Fuel Vehicle (AFV) Acquisition Requirements |
| North Carolina | Biodiesel Warranty Requirement, Biodiesel Requirement for School Buses, Alternative Fuel Vehicle (AFV) Acquisition Requirements |
| North Dakota | Authorization to Provide Advanced Biofuel Incentives, Alternative Fuel Labeling Requirement, Regional Biofuels Corridor, etc. |
| Ohio | Alternative Fuel Signage, Regional Biofuels Promotion Plan, Alternative Fuel Vehicle (AFV) Acquisition and Fuel Use Requirements, Alternative Fuel Vehicle Conversion |
| Oklahoma | Access to State Alternative Fueling Stations, Biofuels Research and Development Promotion, State Energy Efficiency and Conservation Plans, etc. |
| Oregon | Establishment Low Carbon Transportation Fuel Standards, Renewable Fuels Mandate, Biodiesel Quality Testing Procedures, etc. |
| Pennsylvania | Renewable Fuels Mandate, Alternative Fuels Tax |
| Rhode Island | Alternative Fuel Vehicle (AFV) and Hybrid Electric Vehicle (HEV) Acquisition Requirements |
| South Carolina | Biofuel Blending Capability Requirements and Regulations, State Agency Biodiesel Blend Mandate, State Agency Preference for Alternative Fuel and Advanced Vehicles, etc. |
| South Dakota | Biofuels Production Protection, Regional Biofuels Promotion Plan, Biofuels Economic Development Plan, etc. |
| Tennessee | Biofuel Blending Contract Regulation, Supply of Petroleum Products for Blending with Biofuels, Biodiesel and Ethanol Definitions and Retail Requirements, etc. |
| Texas | Alternative Fuel Use and Vehicle Acquisition Requirements, Renewable Fuel Promotion, Ethanol, Biodiesel, and Renewable Diesel Production Fee |
| Utah | Provision for Establishment of Alternative Fuel Use Mandate |
| Vermont | Green Workforce Collaborative, Alternative Fuel Vehicle (AFV) Acquisition Requirements, State Agency Energy Plan Transportation Requirements |
| Virginia | Alternative Fuel Use and Fuel-Efficient Vehicle Acquisition Requirements, Biodiesel and Green Diesel Fuel Use Requirement, State Energy Plan, etc. |
| Washington | Renewable Fuel Standard, Provision for Alternative Fuels Corridor Pilot Projects, Biofuel Blend Dispenser Labeling Requirement |
| West Virginia | Alternative Fuels Studies, Alternative Fuel Production Subsidy Prohibition, Provision for Establishment of Alternative Fuel Vehicle (AFV) Acquisition Requirements, Alternative Fuel Use Requirement |
| Wisconsin | Alternative Fuel Vehicle (AFV) Acquisition and Alternative Fuel Use Requirements, Alternative Fuel Use and Promotion Plan, Petroleum Reduction Requirements, etc. |

== Rules and regulations ==
=== Rule making process ===
The rule making process differs from the legislative Acts of Congress. It requires much more public involvement and generally requires many rewrites of certain policies.

==== Motives for change ====
Federal regulations from different agencies are the results of Congress mandating the creation of standards for some type of industry. In this case Congress will have mandated programs in agencies such as the DOE, DOT, USDA, and FTC to regulate and encourage the production, distribution, and implementation of biofuels throughout the US.

==== Full procedure ====
The Rule making process usually takes a couple years, and requires public involvement, but is usually done outside of Congress. After the legislature mandates an agency to make a new regulation that agency may make an announcement via the Federal Register that is considering creating a new regulation, call an Advanced Notice of Proposed Rule-making (ANOPR). In this general statement the agency is simply making a declaration of changes it might make and is letting the public know dates and times of which discussion on these changes may be. Once that agency has decided to make the rule they will send out a new announcement called a Notice of Proposed Rule-making (NOPR) saying that it intends to make a new rule, and the details of what it may be. These NOPRs then ask for public feedback, both in the form of letters, emails, and open forum discussion set up by that agency. The exact date and times of meetings and deadlines will also be detailed. After that deadline the agency will use the public feedback and revise the proposed standards to meet those. Another NOPR will then be sent it out, again, calling for feedback, and more revisions will take place. After this process takes place a few times the agency will send out a final copy of the new regulations and they will take effect as law for that industry.

=== Agency policy ===
Every agency mandated by the federal government to work with some aspect of biofuel creation and implementation has several different responsibilities in regulating the biofuel industry. These include policies to encourage their development, regulate the mass production, reduce their costs, and promote biofuel in government vehicles.

==== Department of Energy (DOE) ====
The DOE has created a number of programs intended to disseminate information regarding alternative fuels.

- Energy Efficiency & Renewable Energy (EERE)
  - Biomass Program
  - Clean Cities
  - Alternative Fuels & Advanced Vehicles Data Center

The DOE is also responsible for administration of various financial incentive programs including the following.

- Biorefinery Project Grants
- Loan Guarantees for Ethanol and Commercial Byproducts from Cellulose, Municipal Solid Waste (MSW), and Sugar Cane
- DOE Loan Guarantee Program
- Cellulosic Ethanol Reserve Auction

==== Environmental Protection Agency (EPA) ====
The EPA is responsible for administration of the Renewable Fuel Standard (RFS) established by EPAct 2005 (P.L. 109-58) and amended by EISA 2007 (P.L. 110-140). These responsibilities include promulgating rules detailing compliance standards for fuel suppliers and for establishing a system which allows renewable fuel credits to be traded between fuel suppliers.

==== Department of Transportation (DOT) ====
The DOT is responsible for administration of the Flexible Fuel Vehicle (FFV) Production Incentive.

==== Internal Revenue Service (IRS) ====
The IRS is responsible for administration of a variety of tax credits and related incentives.

- Volumetric Ethanol Excise Tax Credit
- Small Ethanol Excise Tax Credit
- small Ethanol Producer Credit
- Biodiesel Tax Credit
- Small Agri-Biodiesel Producer Credit
- Renewable Diesel Tax credit
- Credit for Production of Cellulosic Biofuel
- Special Depreciation Allowance for Cellulosic Biofuel Plant Property
- Alternative Fuel Station Credit

==== United States Department of Agriculture (USDA) ====
The USDA is responsible for programs related to promotion of alternative fuels.

- Biorefinery Assistance
- Repowering Assistance
- Bioenergy Program for Advanced Biofuels
- Feedstock Flexibility Program for Producers of Biofuels
- Biomass Crop Assistance Program (BCAP)
- Rural Energy for America Program (REAP)
- Biomass Research and Development
- Business and Industry (B&I) Guaranteed Loans
- Rural Business Enterprise Grants (RBEG)
- Value-Added Grants
- Rural Economic Development Loan and Grant Programs
