= Cello Energy =

Cello Energy was an Alabama biofuels company. The company proposed to produce energy from cellulosic ethanol. In 2010, the United States Environmental Protection Agency projected the company could produce 70 million gallons of cellulosic diesel before reducing their projections to 5 million gallons and then removing the company from supplier listings in 2011. Cello Energy filed for bankruptcy in 2010. In 2009, Cello Energy lost a federal lawsuit based on allegations of breach of contract and fraudulent claims, and was ordered to pay $10.4 million.

== See also ==
- Abengoa Bioenergy
- Range Fuels
- DuPont Danisco
