= Renewable Energy Group =

Renewable Energy Group, Inc.
- Type: Subsidiary
- Traded as: Nasdaq: REGI
- Industry: Renewable energy industry
- Predecessor: West Central Cooperative
- Founded: 2006
- Headquarters: Ames, Iowa, United States
- Key people: Cynthia Warner, President and CEO
- Products: Biodiesel
- Revenue: ▼$2.135 billion (2020)
- Net income: ▼$122.813 million (2020)
- Total assets: ▼$1.461 billion (2020)
- Number of employees: 900+ (US), 126 (Intl) (2017)
- Parent: Chevron Corporation
- Website: www.regi.com

Renewable Energy Group is a biodiesel production company headquartered in Ames, Iowa. The company operates 12 biorefineries and a feedstock processing facility. As of 2018, the company is a Fortune 1000 corporation.

== History ==
Renewable Energy Group began in 1996 as the biodiesel division of West Central Cooperative with the construction of a plant in Ralston, Iowa. In 2006, the company separated from West Central and moved its headquarters to Ames.

In 2013, the company acquired Tulsa-based biofuels company Syntroleum Corporation amid that company's struggles for profitability. In 2015 it acquired the assets of Seattle-based biodiesel company Imperium Renewables.

On February 28, 2022, the company announced they would be acquired by the California-based oil company Chevron Corporation. On June 13, the acquisition was completed.

=== Leadership ===
Upon separation from West Central, the initial CEO of the company was Jeff Stroburg, succeeded in 2011 by Daniel Oh. After Oh's abrupt and unexpected resignation in 2017, Reginald Howard became interim CEO, and was replaced in 2018 by Cynthia Warner.

== Plant explosions ==
In June 2001, the predecessor company's InterWest facility in Ralston exploded, leaving one man in critical condition.

The company's biofuels production facility in Geismar, Louisiana suffered from explosions in April and September 2015. As a result of this explosion, Renewable Energy Group was cited with three "willful" safety violations and was fined $70,000 by OSHA.
