= Danisco =

Danish producer of enzymes, excipients, and bioingredients

Danisco A/S
- Company type: Subsidiary
- Industry: Agriculture, chemicals
- Founded: 1989; 37 years ago
- Headquarters: Copenhagen, Denmark
- Key people: Craig F. Binetti (president)
- Products: Enzymes and excipients, bioingredients
- Revenue: DKK 13.71 billion (2009/10)
- Operating income: DKK 895 million (2009/10)
- Net income: DKK 480 million (2009/10)
- Number of employees: 6,880 (April 2010)
- Parent: IFF

Danisco A/S is a Danish bio-based company with activities in food production, enzymes and other bioproducts as well as a wide variety of pharmaceutical grade excipients. It was formed in 1989 from the largest Danish industrial merger ever of the two old C.F. Tietgen companies Danish Sugar (founded 1872), and Dansk Handels- og Industri Company (Danisco A/S).

Danisco is one of the world's leading producers of ingredients for food and other consumer products and was also one of the biggest sugar producers in Europe until the divestment of its sugar division to Nordzucker in 2009.

Headquartered in Copenhagen, the group has approximately 6,800 employees in more than 80 locations in 40 countries.

Danisco shares were listed on the Copenhagen Stock Exchange and a member of the blue chip OMX Copenhagen 20 index until June 2011, when DuPont completed a US$6.3 billion acquisition of the company. On February 1, 2021, DuPont's Nutrition & Biociences business unit, which includes Danisco, spun off from DuPont and merged with IFF through a Reverse Morris Trust transaction.

== Activities ==
The company's activities were structured into two lines of business: Food Ingredients and Industrial enzymes. The Food Ingredients business supplied bio-based ingredients for food and beverage products and comprises the business segments Enablers, Cultures, and Sweeteners, while the Industrial Enzymes business (handled by subsidiary Genencor) focuses on industrial biotechnology and encompasses business segments such as Fabric and Household Care (enzymes for laundry and dishwashing detergents), Technical Enzymes (enzymes for bioethanol and carbohydrate processing as well as textile treatment), and Food and Animal Nutrition (enzymes for bread, feed, and brewing applications).

Danisco also had two biochemical projects: DuPont Danisco Cellulosic Ethanol LLC, a biofuels joint venture with DuPont, and a project with Goodyear to develop a new type of synthetic rubber, called bioIsoprene.

On 9 January 2011, DuPont announced that it had reached agreement to buy Danisco for US$6.3 billion. The acquisition was motivated by a desire by DuPont "to gain production of food additives and enzymes used in biofuels." On 16 May 2011 DuPont announced that its tender offer for Danisco had been successful and that it would proceed to redeem the remaining shares and delist the company.

The food ingredients and enzyme businesses were combined with similar pre-existing efforts at DuPont into two business divisions named 'Nutrition and Health' and 'Industrial Biosciences', and subsequently into one 'Nutrition & Biosciences' division.

=== Research and development ===
A considerable number of the employees are engaged in research and development of new products for the international food industry. Today, the Group holds more than 9,300 active patents and patent applications. Their work led to the understanding of the mechanism of CRISPR, the bacterial antiviral defense.
