= Green Plains =

American ethanol producer

Green Plains Inc.
- Type: Public
- Traded as: Nasdaq: GPRE
- Industry: Ethanol; Commodity
- Founded: 2004; 22 years ago
- Founder: Barry Ellsworth
- Headquarters: Omaha, Nebraska, U.S.
- Area served: Worldwide
- Key people: [Chris Osowski] (CEO)
- Products: Energy trading
- Number of employees: 1,427 (2017)
- Website: gpreinc.com

Green Plains Inc. is an American company based in Omaha, Nebraska that was founded in 2004. The company is the third largest ethanol fuel producer in North America (as of February 2012). It was reported in early 2012 that the company ships approximately one billion gallons of ethanol per year. The company employs approximately 640 people, and was founded by Barry Ellsworth. Green Plains Inc. is listed on the NASDAQ Stock Exchange as GPRE.

== Corporate events ==
- 2014 - Green Plains changed their name from Green Plains Renewable Energy, Inc. to Green Plains Inc. in May 2014.
- 2012 - Green Plains completed sale of agribusiness assets including 12 grain elevators in northwestern Iowa and western Tennessee to The Andersons in December 2012.
  - XMS Capital Partners served as financial advisor to Green Plains in the transaction.

== See also ==
- Biofuel in the United States
- Ethanol fuel in the United States
- Methanol economy
- Renewable Fuels Association
