= Genencor =

US biotech company

Genencor International
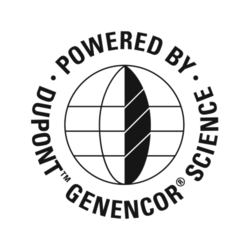
- Company type: Subsidiary
- Industry: Biotechnology
- Founded: 1982; 44 years ago
- Headquarters: Palo Alto, California, U.S.
- Key people: Tjerk de Ruiter (Chairman & CEO)
- Products: Purafect, Properase, Spezyme
- Revenue: ▲US$380 million (2005)
- Number of employees: 1,500 (2005)
- Parent: IFF
- Website: biosciences.dupont.com

Genencor is a biotechnology company based in Palo Alto, CA and a subsidiary of IFF. Genencor is a producer of Industrial enzymes and low-priced bulk protein. It is considered to have pioneered the field of industrial biotechnology, as distinct from traditional applications of biotechnology to health care and agriculture.

== History ==
The name Genencor originates with Genencor, Inc., the original joint venture between Genentech and Corning Incorporated, which was founded in 1982. A.E. Staley made a substantial investment to the company in 1984, making it a partner with Corning and Genentech. After Eastman bought A.E. Staley's share, Genencor became part of Eastman Kodak.

In 2005 Genencor was acquired by Danisco.

In 2008 Genencor entered a joint venture with DuPont, called DuPont Danisco Cellulosic Ethanol LLC, to develop and commercialize low cost technology for the production of cellulosic ethanol. In 2008, Genencor and Goodyear announced they were working to develop BioIsoprene.

In 2011, DuPont acquired Danisco for $6.3 billion.

In 2021, portions of DuPont including the Genencor division were acquired by International Flavors & Fragrances.

== See also ==
- Environmental biotechnology
- Agricultural biotechnology
