= DuPont Danisco =

50/50 joint venture between DuPont and Genencor

DuPont Danisco Cellulosic Ethanol LLC
- Type: LLC; Joint venture
- Founded: July 21, 2008
- Headquarters: Itasca, IL, USA
- Key people: Joseph R. Skurla, President
- Parent: DuPont, Danisco

DuPont Danisco Cellulosic Ethanol LLC (DDCE) was a 50/50 joint venture between DuPont and Genencor, a subsidiary of Danisco. The company was formed to accelerate the development and deployment of cellulosic ethanol, which is made from non-food biomass. DDCE planned aimed to commercialize low-cost technology for the production of cellulosic ethanol. It also engaged in limited operations of cellulosic ethanol biorefineries.

== History ==
The company's collaborations include work with Genera Energy and the University of Tennessee Research Foundation. DDCE has constructed a demonstration-scale biorefinery and research and development facility for cellulosic ethanol in Vonore, Tennessee. The plant went into operation at the end of 2009. It produced ethanol through biochemical fermentation using corn stover, cobs, fiber, and switchgrass. The facility was capable of 250,000 gallons of ethanol output annually. The company, however, stated that it did not intend to produce more than 150,000 gallons of ethanol from the facility as its operations merely provided information for future construction and optimization of larger, commercial scale cellulosic ethanol production facilities.

In 2011, the company was awarded a $9 million grant by the Iowa Power Fund Board to break ground for a 25 MMgy refinery that can convert corn stover to ethanol. The fund added to the $226 million cost of the project.

DDCE was founded as a joint venture with Genencor in 2008. It was eventually dissolved in 2011 due to the acquisition of Danisco by DuPont.
