= Range Fuels =

- Company type: Private
- Founded: 2006
- Founder: Vinod Khosla
- Defunct: 2011
- Fate: Insolvency
- Headquarters: Broomfield, Colorado
- Key people: David Aldous, CEO
- Products: cellulosic ethanol
- Parent: Khosla Ventures
- Website: www.rangefuels.com

Range Fuels was a company that tried to develop technology for the conversion of biomass into ethanol without the use of enzymes. The technology employed was biomass gasification followed by syngas conversion over heterogeneous molybdenum-based catalysts to a mixture of aliphatic alcohols. The company began in 2006 as Kergy and changed its name to Range Fuels in 2007. The company broke ground on its first commercial-scale cellulosic ethanol facility in November 2007.

According to the Washington Examiner, Range Fuels' Soperton, GA plant closed down in January 2011 after receiving a $76 million grant from the US Department of Energy, $6 million from the State of Georgia, and an $80 million loan guaranteed by the U.S. Biorefinery Assistance Program.

Range Fuel officially closed down in late 2011 with a foreclosure sale of its plant held on 3 January 2012.

The facility was sold to New Zealand-based start-up LanzaTech in 2012 for $5.4 million and renamed the Freedom Pines Biorefinery. Unlike Range Fuels, LanzaTech will use microbes to transform the gas into ethanol; a byproduct to their process is butanediol. Both products can be formulated into jet fuel with assistance from LanzaTech partner firms. Lanzatech is also a Vinod Khosla-funded venture.
