= Fuel Bio =

Fuel Bio One, LLC, is a commercial producer of Biodiesel at its facility in Elizabeth, NJ. Biodiesel is a renewable, clean burning diesel replacement. It is made from a diverse mix of naturally occurring oils and fats.
