= Imperium Renewables =

Renewable energy company

Imperium Renewables, Inc. was a renewable energy company based in Seattle, Washington. It is the parent company for Seattle Biodiesel and Imperium Hawaii in Oahu. The company was founded in 2004 by John Plaza.

The company experienced financial hardships when the European Union finalized a tariff on United States biodiesel and forced the company to halt all production in mid-2009. In March 2010, the company restarted its operations.

Imperium Renewables is a stakeholder in Sustainable Aviation Fuels Northwest (SAFN), an organization with over 40 members, that promotes the production of sustainable aviation fuels in the Northwest United States. In September 2013, the Federal Aviation Administration chose Washington state as the location for a national aviation biofuel research center, the Center of Excellence in Alternative Jet Fuels and Environment, which will include Imperium Renewables as one of the industry partners.

The company has been represented by the law firm Wilson Sonsini Goodrich & Rosati.

In August 2015, Renewable Energy Group Inc (REG), a biofuels company headquartered in Ames, Iowa, announced that it would acquire "substantially all" of Imperium Renewables' assets.
