= Ethanol fuel in Brazil =

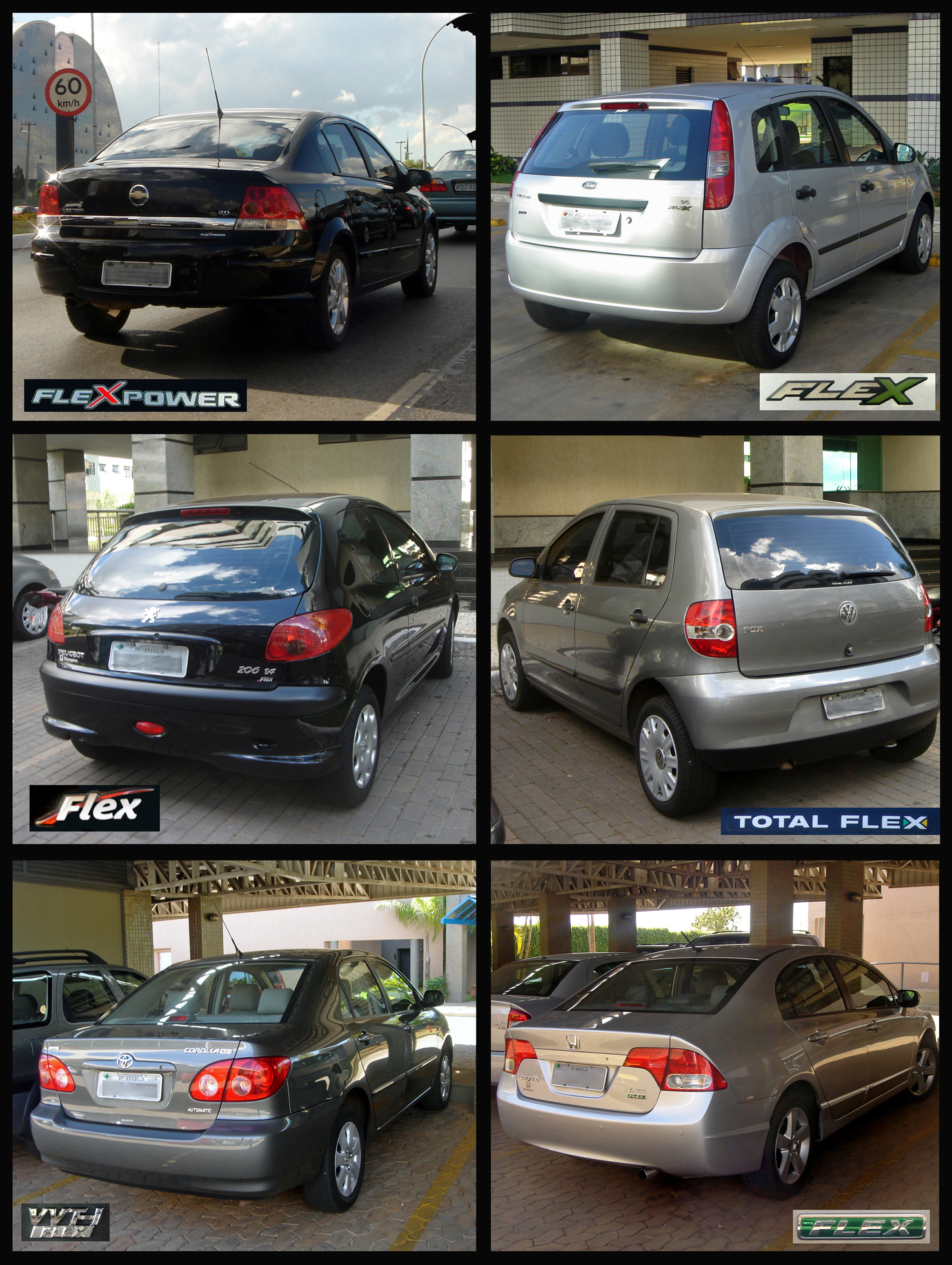
Six typical Brazilian flex-fuel models from several car makers, popularly called "flex" cars, that run on any blend of hydrous ethanol (E100) and gasoline (E20 to E25)

Brazil is the world's second largest producer of ethanol fuel. Brazil and the United States have led the industrial production of ethanol fuel for several years, together accounting for 85 percent of the world's production in 2017. Brazil produced 26.72 billion liters (7.06 billion U.S. liquid gallons), representing 26.1 percent of the world's total ethanol used as fuel in 2017.

Between 2006 and 2008, Brazil was considered to have the world's first "sustainable" biofuels economy and the biofuel industry leader, a policy model for other countries; and its sugarcane ethanol "the most successful alternative fuel to date." However, some authors consider that the successful Brazilian ethanol model is sustainable only in Brazil due to its advanced agri-industrial technology and its enormous amount of arable land available; while according to other authors it is a solution only for some countries in the tropical zone of Latin America, the Caribbean, and Africa. In recent years however, later-generation biofuels have sprung up which use crops that are explicitly grown for fuel production and are not suitable for use as food.

Brazil's 40-year-old ethanol fuel program is based on the most efficient agricultural technology for sugarcane cultivation in the world, uses modern equipment and cheap sugar cane as feedstock, the residual cane-waste (bagasse) is used to produce heat and power, which results in a very competitive price and also in a high energy balance (output energy/input energy), which varies from 8.3 for average conditions to 10.2 for best practice production. In 2010, the U.S. EPA designated Brazilian sugarcane ethanol as an advanced biofuel due to its 61% reduction of total life cycle greenhouse gas emissions, including direct indirect land use change emissions.

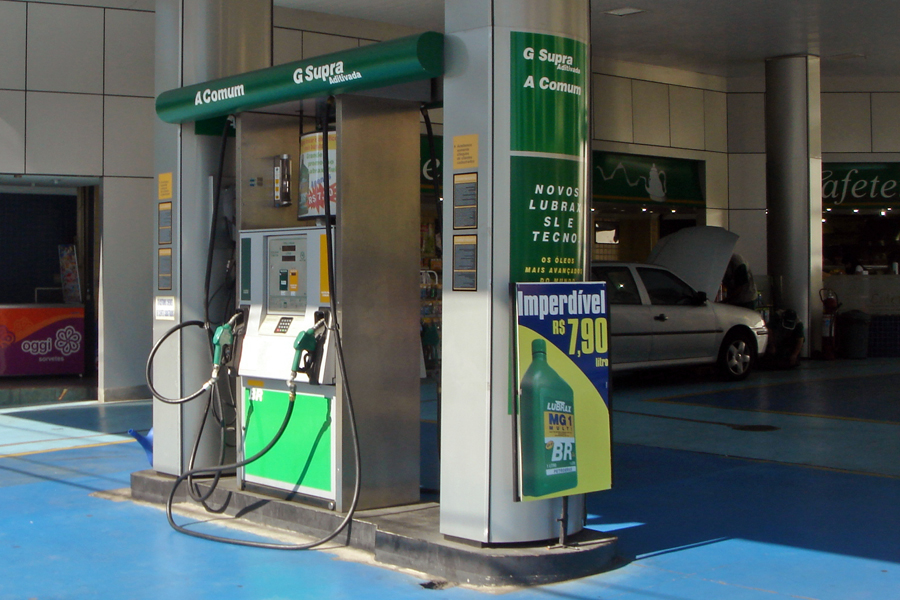
Brazil has ethanol fuel available throughout the country. Shown here a typical Petrobras gas station at São Paulo with dual fuel service, marked A for alcohol (ethanol) and G for gasoline.

There are no longer any light vehicles in Brazil running on pure gasoline. Since 1976 the government made it mandatory to blend anhydrous ethanol with gasoline, fluctuating between 10% and 22%. and requiring just a minor adjustment on regular gasoline engines. In 1993 the mandatory blend was fixed by law at 22% anhydrous ethanol (E22) by volume in the entire country, but with leeway to the Executive to set different percentages of ethanol within pre-established boundaries. In 2003 these limits were set at a minimum of 20% and a maximum of 25%. Since July 1, 2007, the mandatory blend is 25% of anhydrous ethanol and 75% gasoline or E25 blend. The lower limit was reduced to 18% in April 2011 due to recurring ethanol supply shortages and high prices that take place between harvest seasons. By mid March 2015 the government temporarily raised the ethanol blend in regular gasoline from 25% to 27%.

The Brazilian car manufacturing industry developed flexible-fuel vehicles that can run on any proportion of gasoline (E20-E25 blend) and hydrous ethanol (E100). Introduced in the market in 2003, flex vehicles became a commercial success, dominating the passenger vehicle market with a 94% market share of all new cars and light vehicles sold in 2013. By mid-2010 there were 70 flex models available in the market, and as of December 2013, a total of 15 car manufacturers produce flex-fuel engines, dominating all light vehicle segments except sports cars, off-road vehicles and minivans. The cumulative production of flex-fuel cars and light commercial vehicles reached the milestone of 10 million vehicles in March 2010, and the 20 million-unit milestone was reached in June 2013. As of June 2015, flex-fuel light-duty vehicle cumulative sales totaled 25.5 million units, and production of flex motorcycles totaled 4 million in March 2015.

The success of "flex" vehicles, together with the mandatory E25 blend throughout the country, allowed ethanol fuel consumption in the country to achieve a 50% market share of the gasoline-powered fleet in February 2008. In terms of energy equivalent, sugarcane ethanol represented 17.6% of the country's total energy consumption by the transport sector in 2008.

== History ==
Historical evolution of ethanol blends used in Brazil (1976–2015)
| Year | Ethanol blend | Year | Ethanol blend | Year | Ethanol blend |
|---|---|---|---|---|---|
| 1931 | E5 | 1989 | E18–22–13 | 2004 | E20 |
| 1976 | E11 | 1992 | E13 | 2005 | E22 |
| 1977 | E10 | 1993–98 | E22 | 2006 | E20 |
| 1978 | E18–20–23 | 1999 | E24 | 2007 | E23-25 |
| 1981 | E20–12–20 | 2000 | E20 | 2008 | E25 |
| 1982 | E15 | 2001 | E22 | 2009 | E25 |
| 1984–86 | E20 | 2002 | E24–25 | 2010 | E20–25 |
| 1987–88 | E22 | 2003 | E20–25 | 2011 | E18–25 |
| | | | | 2015 | E27 |
Source: J.A. Puerto Rica (2007), Table 3.8, pp. 81–82; Note: The 2010 reduction from E25 to E20 was temporary and took place between February and April. In April 2011 the lower blend floor was reduced to E18.

Sugarcane has been cultivated in Brazil since 1532 as sugar was one of the first commodities exported to Europe by the Portuguese settlers. The first use of sugarcane ethanol as a fuel in Brazil dates back to the late 1920s and early 1930s, with the introduction of the automobile in the country. Ethanol fuel production peaked during World War II and, as German submarine attacks threatened oil supplies, the mandatory blend became as high as 50% in 1943. After the end of the war cheap oil caused gasoline to prevail, and ethanol blends were only used sporadically, mostly to take advantage of sugar surpluses, until the seventies, when the first oil crisis resulted in gasoline shortages and awareness of the dangers of oil dependence. As a response to this crisis, the Brazilian government began promoting bioethanol as a fuel. The National Alcohol Program -Pró-Álcool- (Portuguese: Programa Nacional do Álcool), launched in 1975, was a nationwide program financed by the government to phase out automobile fuels derived from fossil fuels, such as gasoline, in favor of ethanol produced from sugar cane.

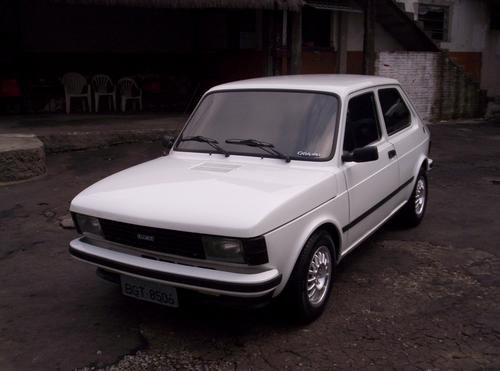
The 1979 Brazilian Fiat 147 was the first modern automobile launched to the market capable of running only on hydrous ethanol fuel (E100).

The first phase of the program concentrated on production of anhydrous ethanol for blending with gasoline. The Brazilian government made mandatory the blending of ethanol fuel with gasoline, fluctuating from 1976 until 1992 between 10% and 22%. Due to this mandatory minimum gasoline blend, pure gasoline (E0) is no longer sold in the country. A federal law was passed in October 1993 establishing a mandatory blend of 22% anhydrous ethanol (E22) in the entire country. This law also authorized the Executive to set different percentages of ethanol within pre-established boundaries; and since 2003 these limits were fixed at a maximum of 25% (E25) and a minimum of 20% (E20) by volume. Since then, the government has set the percentage of the ethanol blend according to the results of the sugarcane harvest and the levels of ethanol production from sugarcane, resulting in blend variations even within the same year.

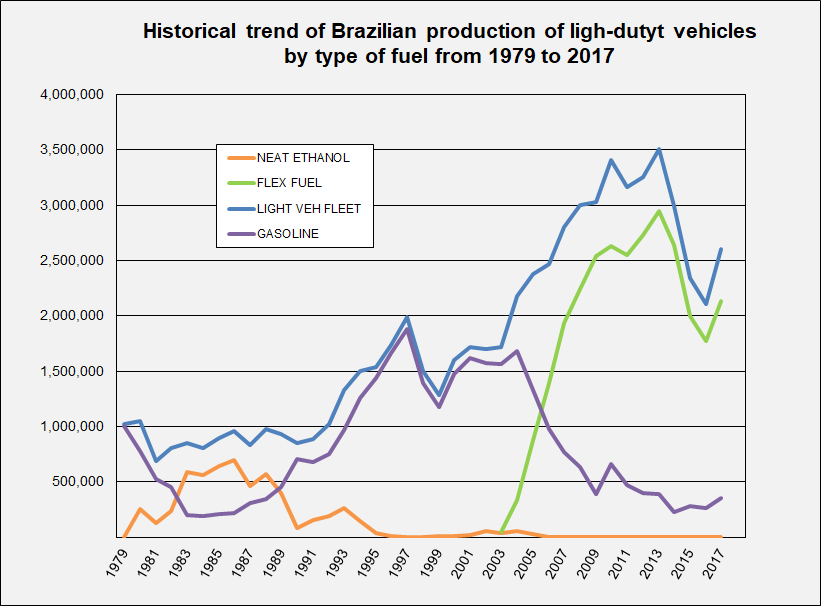
Historical trend of Brazilian production of light vehicles by type of fuel, neat ethanol (alcohol), flex fuel, and gasoline vehicles from 1979 to 2017

Since July 2007 the mandatory blend is 25% of anhydrous ethanol and 75% gasoline or E25 blend. However, in 2010, and as a result of supply concerns and high ethanol fuel prices, the government mandated a temporary 90-day blend reduction from E25 to E20 beginning February 1, 2010. By mid March 2015 the government raised temporarily the ethanol blend in regular gasoline from 25% to 27%. The blend on premium gasoline was kept at 25% upon request by ANFAVEA, the Brazilian association of automakers, because of concerns about the effects on the higher blend on cars that were built for E25, as opposed to flex-fuel cars. The government approved the higher blend as an economic incentive for ethanol producers, due to an existing overstock of over 1 billion liters (264 million US gallons) of ethanol. The implementation of E27 is expected to allow the consumption of the overstock before the end of 2015.

After testing in government fleets with several prototypes developed by the local carmakers, and compelled by the second oil crisis, the Fiat 147, the first modern commercial neat ethanol car (E100 only) was launched to the market in July 1979. The Brazilian government provided three important initial drivers for the ethanol industry: guaranteed purchases by the state-owned oil company Petrobras, low-interest loans for agro-industrial ethanol firms, and fixed gasoline and ethanol prices where hydrous ethanol sold for 59% of the government-set gasoline price at the pump. Subsidising ethanol production in this manner and setting an artificially low price established ethanol as an alternative to gasoline.

After reaching more than 4 million cars and light trucks running on pure ethanol by the late 1980s, representing one-third of the country's motor vehicle fleet, ethanol production and sales of ethanol-only cars tumbled due to several factors. First, gasoline prices fell sharply as a result of the 1980s oil glut, but mainly because of a shortage of ethanol fuel supply in the local market left thousands of vehicles in line at gas stations or out of fuel in their garages by mid-1989. As supply could not keep pace with the increasing demand required by the now significant ethanol-only fleet, the Brazilian government began importing ethanol in 1991. Since 1979 until December 2010 neat ethanol vehicles totaled 5.7 million units. The number of neat ethanol vehicles still in use was estimated between 2 and 3 million vehicles by 2003, and estimated at 1.22 million as of December 2011.

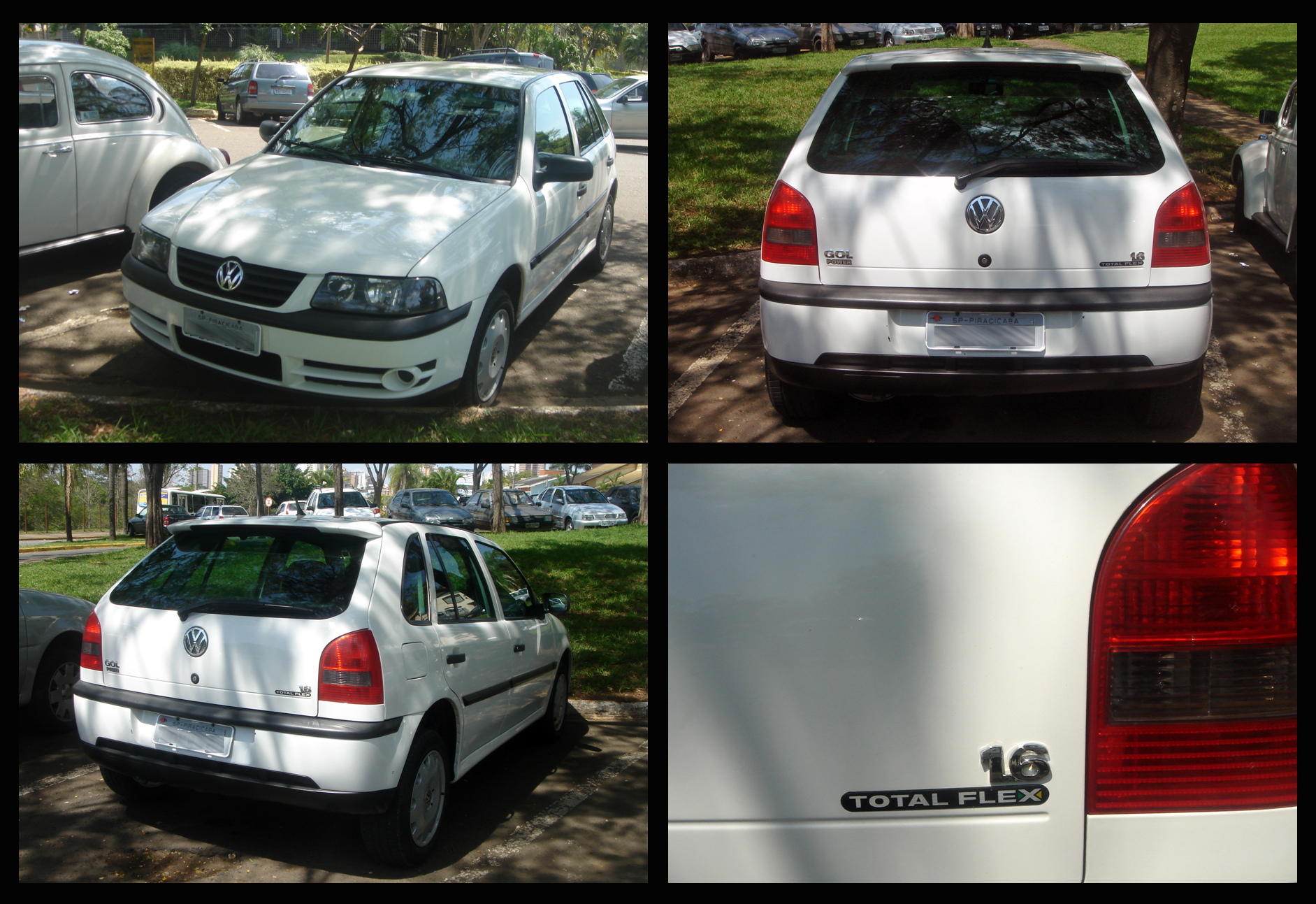
The 2003 Brazilian VW Gol 1.6 Total Flex was the first flexible-fuel car capable of running on any blend of gasoline and ethanol.

Confidence on ethanol-powered vehicles was restored only with the introduction in the Brazilian market of flexible-fuel vehicles. In March 2003 Volkswagen launched in the Brazilian market the Gol 1.6 Total Flex, the first commercial flexible-fuel vehicle capable of running on any blend of gasoline and ethanol. By 2010 manufacturers that build flexible fuel vehicles include Chevrolet, Fiat, Ford, Peugeot, Renault, Volkswagen, Honda, Mitsubishi, Toyota, Citroën, Nissan, and Kia Motors. In 2013, Ford launched the first flex fuel car with direct injection: the Focus 2.0 Duratec Direct Flex.

Flexible fuel cars were 22% of the car sales in 2004, 73% in 2005, 87.6% in July 2008, and reached a record 94% in August 2009. The cumulative production of flex-fuel cars and light commercial vehicles reached the milestone of 10 million vehicles in March 2010, and 15 million in January 2012. Registrations of flex-fuel cars and light trucks represented 87.0% of all passenger and light duty vehicles sold in the country in 2012. Production passed the 20 million-unit mark in June 2013. By the end of 2014, flex-fuel cars represented 54% of the Brazilian registered stock of light-duty vehicles, while gasoline only vehicles represented 34.3%. As of June 2015, flex-fuel light-duty vehicle cumulative sales totaled 25.5 million units.

The rapid adoption and commercial success of "flex" vehicles, as they are popularly known, together with the mandatory blend of alcohol with gasoline as E25 fuel, have increased ethanol consumption up to the point that by February 2008 a landmark in ethanol consumption was achieved when ethanol retail sales surpassed the 50% market share of the gasoline-powered fleet. This level of ethanol fuel consumption had not been reached since the end of the 1980s, at the peak of the Pró-Álcool Program.

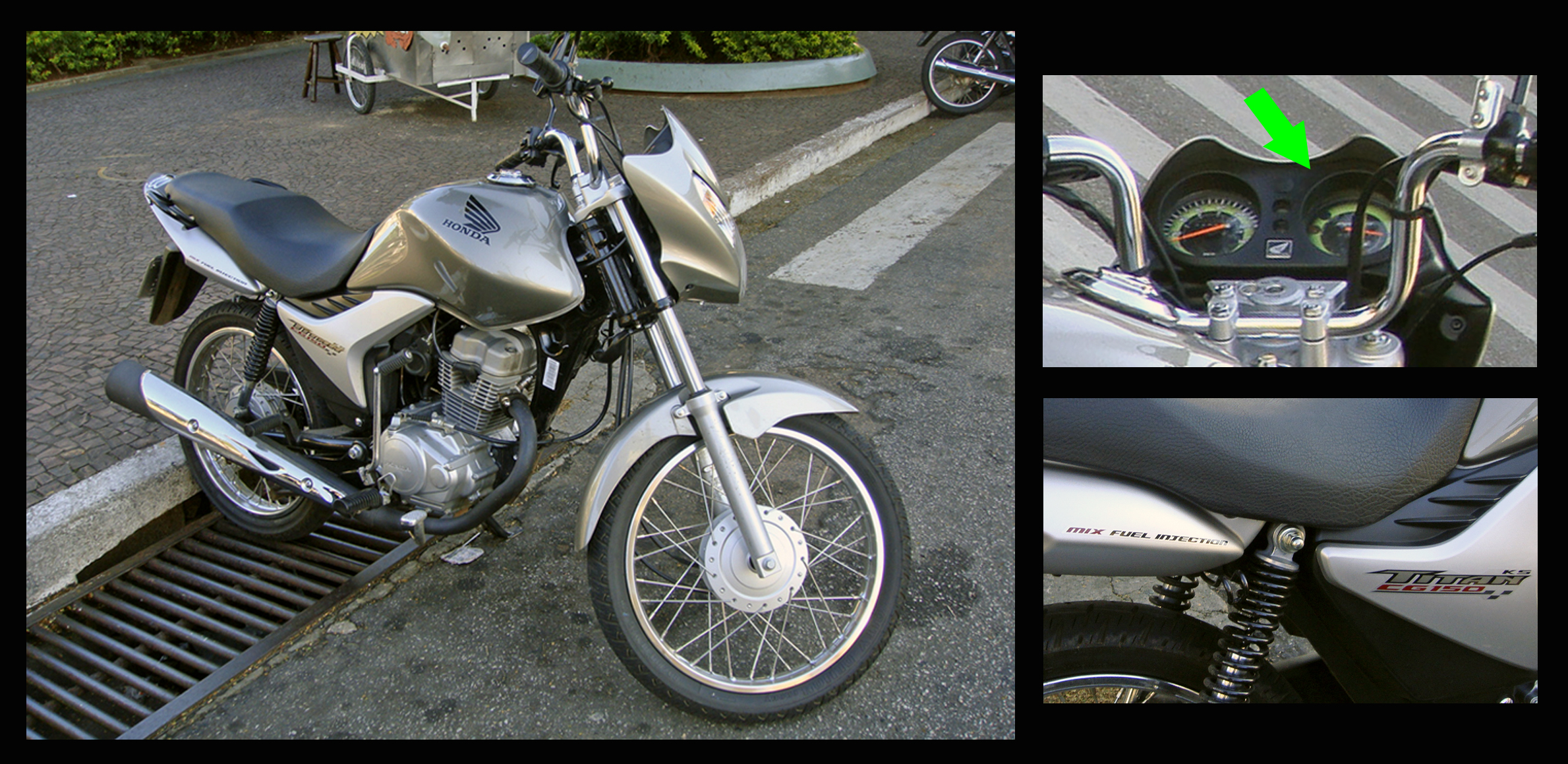
The 2009 Honda CG 150 Titan Mix was launched in the Brazilian market and became the first flex-fuel motorcycle sold in the world.

Under the auspices of the BioEthanol for Sustainable Transport (BEST) project, the first ethanol-powered (ED95) bus began operations in São Paulo city in December 2007 as a one-year trial project. A second ED95 trial bus began operating in São Paulo city in November 2009. Based on the satisfactory results obtained during the 3-year trial operation of the two buses, in November 2010 the municipal government of São Paulo city signed an agreement with UNICA, Cosan, Scania and Viação Metropolitana", the local bus operator, to introduced a fleet of 50 ethanol-powered ED95 buses by May 2011. The local government objective is for the city's entire bus fleet, which is made of 15,000 diesel-powered buses, to use only renewable fuels by 2018. The first ethanol-powered buses were delivered in May 2011, and the 50 ethanol-powered ED95 buses are scheduled to begin regular service in São Paulo in June 2011.

Another innovation of the Brazilian flexible-fuel technology was the development of flex-fuel motorcycles. The first flex motorcycle was launched by Honda in March 2009. Produced by its Brazilian subsidiary Moto Honda da Amazônia, the CG 150 Titan Mix is sold for around US$2,700. In order to avoid cold start problems, the fuel tank must have at least 20% of gasoline at temperatures below 15 °C (59 °F). In September 2009, Honda launched a second flexible-fuel motorcycle, the on-off road NXR 150 Bros Mix. By December 2010 both Honda flexible-fuel motorcycles had reached cumulative sales of 515,726 units, representing an 18.1% market share of the Brazilian new motorcycle sales in 2010. Two other flex-fuel motorcycles manufactured by Honda were launched in October 2010 and January 2011, the CG 150 FAN and the Honda BIZ 125 Flex. During 2011 a total of 956,117 flex-fuel motorcycles were produced, raising its market share to 56.7%. Production reached the 2 million mark in August 2012. Flexible-fuel motorcycle production passed the 3 million-unit milestone in October 2013, and the 4 million mark in March 2015.

== Production ==
=== Economic and production indicators ===
Brazilian ethanol production^{(a)(b)} 2004–2020 (Millions of U.S. gallons)
| 2004 | 2005 | 2006 | 2007 | 2008 | 2009 | 2010 | 2011 | 2012 | 2013 | 2014 | 2015 | 2016 | 2017 | 2018 | 2019 | 2020 |
|---|---|---|---|---|---|---|---|---|---|---|---|---|---|---|---|---|
| 3,989 | 4,227 | 4,491 | 5,019 | 6,472 | 6,578 | 6,922 | 5,573 | 5,577 | 6,267 | 6,760 | 7,200 | 6,750 | 6,650 | 7,990 | 8,590 | 7,930 |
Note: (a) 2004–06 for all grades. (b) 2007–2010 and 2014–2020 ethanol fuel only.

Ethanol production in Brazil uses sugarcane as feedstock and relies on first-generation technologies based on the use of the sucrose content of sugarcane. Ethanol yield has grown 3.77% per year since 1975 and productivity gains have been based on improvements in the agricultural and industrial phases of the production process. Further improvements on best practices are expected to allow in the short to mid-term an average ethanol productivity of 9,000 liters per hectare.

There were 378 ethanol plants operating in Brazil by July 2008, 126 dedicated to ethanol production and 252 producing both sugar and ethanol. There are 15 additional plants dedicated exclusively to sugar production. These plants have an installed capacity of crushing 538 million metric tons of sugarcane per year, and there are 25 plants under construction expected to be on line by 2009 that will add an additional capacity of crushing 50 million tons of sugarcane per year. The typical plant costs approximately US$150 million and requires a nearby sugarcane plantation of 30,000 hectares.

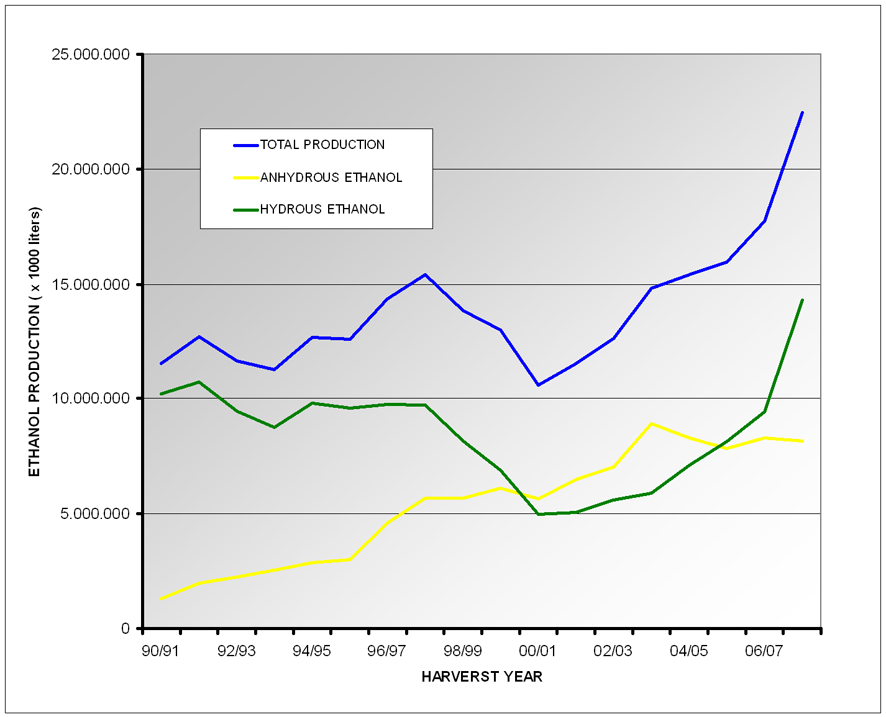
Production by harvest year 1990/91 to 2007/08. Green is hydrated ethanol (E100) and yellow is anhydrous ethanol use for gasohol blending.

Ethanol production is concentrated in the Central and Southeast regions of the country, led by São Paulo state, with around 60% of the country's total ethanol production, followed by Paraná (8%), Minas Gerais (8%) and Goiás (5%). These two regions have been responsible for 90% of Brazil's ethanol production since 2005 and the harvest season goes from April to November. The Northeast Region is responsible for the remaining 10% of ethanol production, led by Alagoas with 2% of total production. The harvest season in the North-Northeast region goes from September to March, and the average productivity in this region is lower than the South-Central region. Due to the difference in the two main harvest seasons, Brazilian statistics for sugar and ethanol production are commonly reported on a harvest two-year basis rather than on a calendar year.

For the 2008/09 harvest it is expected that about 44% of the sugarcane will be used for sugar, 1% for alcoholic beverages, and 55% for ethanol production. An estimate of between 24.9 billion litres (6.58 billion U.S. liquid gallons) and 27.1 billion litres (7.16 billion gallons) of ethanol are expected to be produced in 2008/09 harvest year, with most of the production being destined for the internal market, and only 4.2 billion liters (1.1 billion gallons) for exports, with an estimated 2.5 billion liters (660 million gallons) destined for the US market. Sugarcane cultivated area grew from 7 million to 7.8 million hectares of land from 2007 to 2008, mainly using abandoned pasture lands. In 2008 Brazil has 276 million hectares of arable land, 72% use for pasture, 16.9% for grain crops, and 2.8% for sugarcane, meaning that ethanol is just requiring approximately 1.5% of all arable land available in the country.

As sugar and ethanol share the same feedstock and their industrial processing is fully integrated, formal employment statistics are usually presented together. In 2000 there were 642,848 workers employed by these industries, and as ethanol production expanded, by 2005 there were 982,604 workers employed in the sugarcane cultivation and industrialization, including 414,668 workers in the sugarcane fields, 439,573 workers in the sugar mills, and 128,363 workers in the ethanol distilleries. While employment in the ethanol distilleries grew 88.4% from 2000 to 2005, employment in the sugar fields just grew 16.2% as a direct result of expansion of mechanical harvest instead manual harvesting, which avoids burning the sugarcane fields before manual cutting and also increases productivity. The states with the most employment in 2005 were São Paulo (39.2%), Pernambuco (15%), Alagoas (14.1%), Paraná (7%), and Minas Gerais (5.6%).

==== 2009–2014 crisis ====
Since 2009 the Brazilian ethanol industry has experienced a crisis due to multiple causes. They include the 2008 financial crisis; poor sugarcane harvests due to unfavorable weather; high sugar prices in the world market that made more attractive to produce sugar rather than ethanol; a freeze imposed by the Brazilian government on the petrol and diesel prices. Brazilian ethanol fuel production in 2011 was 21.1 billion liters (5.6 billion U.S. liquid gallons), down from 26.2 billion liters (6.9 billion gallons) in 2010, while in 2012 the production of ethanol was 26% lower than in 2008. By 2012 a total of 41 ethanol plants out of about 400 have closed and the sugar-cane crop yields dropped from 115 tonnes per hectare in 2008 to 69 tonnes per hectare in 2012.

A supply shortage took place for several months during 2010 and 2011, and prices climbed to the point that ethanol fuel was no longer attractive for owners of flex-fuel vehicles; the government reduced the minimum ethanol blend in gasoline to reduce demand and keep ethanol fuel prices from rising further; and for the first time since the 1990s, (corn) ethanol fuel was imported from the United States. The imports totaled around 1.5 billion litres in 2011–2012. The ethanol share in the transport fuel market decreased from 55% in 2008 to 35% in 2012. As a result of higher ethanol prices combined with government subsidies to keep gasoline price lower than the international market value, by November 2013 only 23% flex-fuel car owners were using ethanol regularly, down from 66% in 2009.

During 2014 Brazil produced 23.4 billion liters (6.19 billion U.S. liquid gallons) of ethanol fuel, however, during that year Brazil imported ethanol from the United States, ranking as the second largest U.S. export market in 2014 after Canada, and representing about 13% of total American exports. Production recovered since 2015, and Brazil produced 26.72 billion liters (7.06 billion U.S. liquid gallons) in 2017, representing 26.1 percent of the world's total ethanol used as fuel.

=== Agricultural technology ===
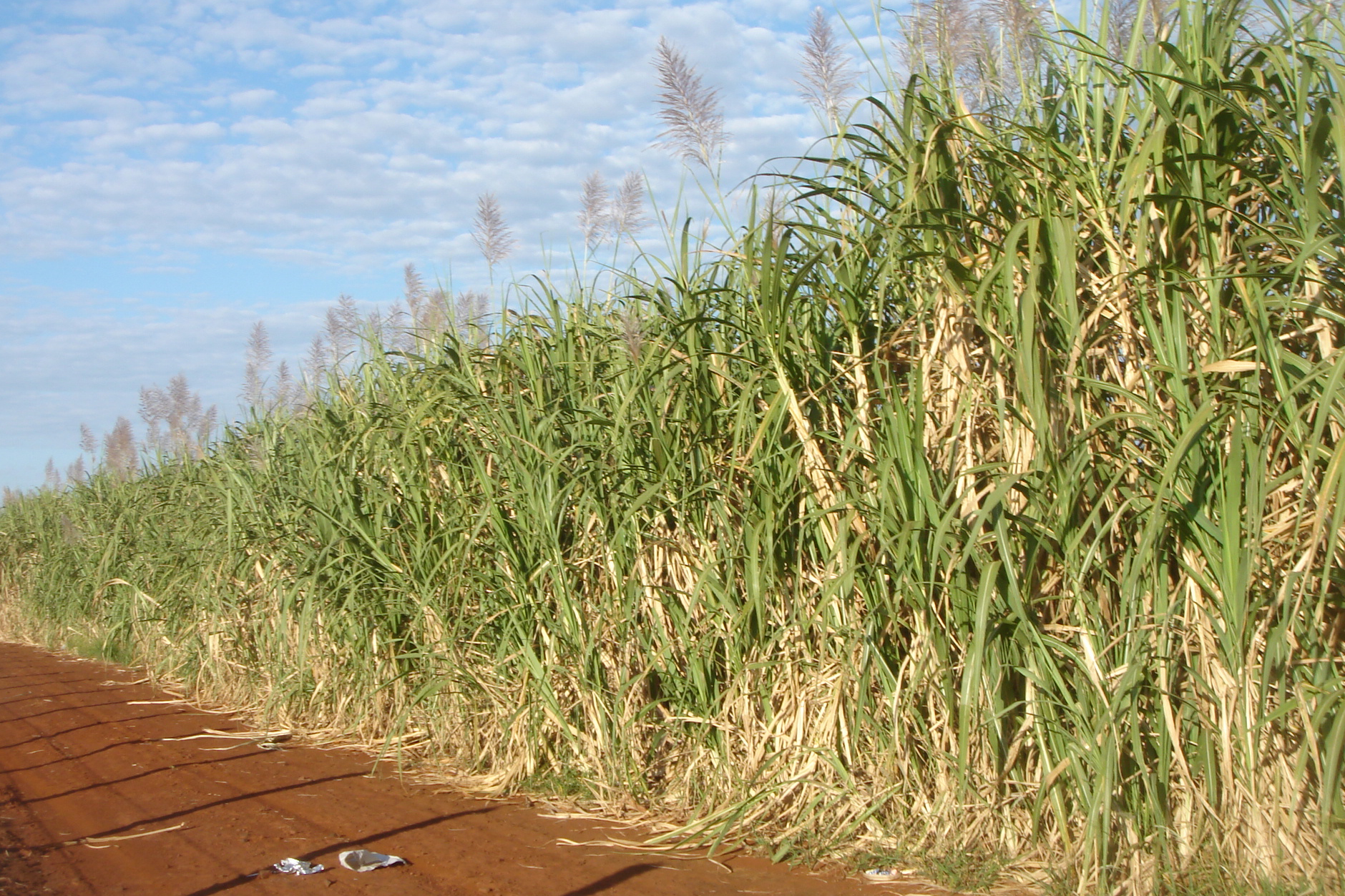
Sugarcane (Saccharum officinarum) plantation ready for harvest, Ituverava, São Paulo State

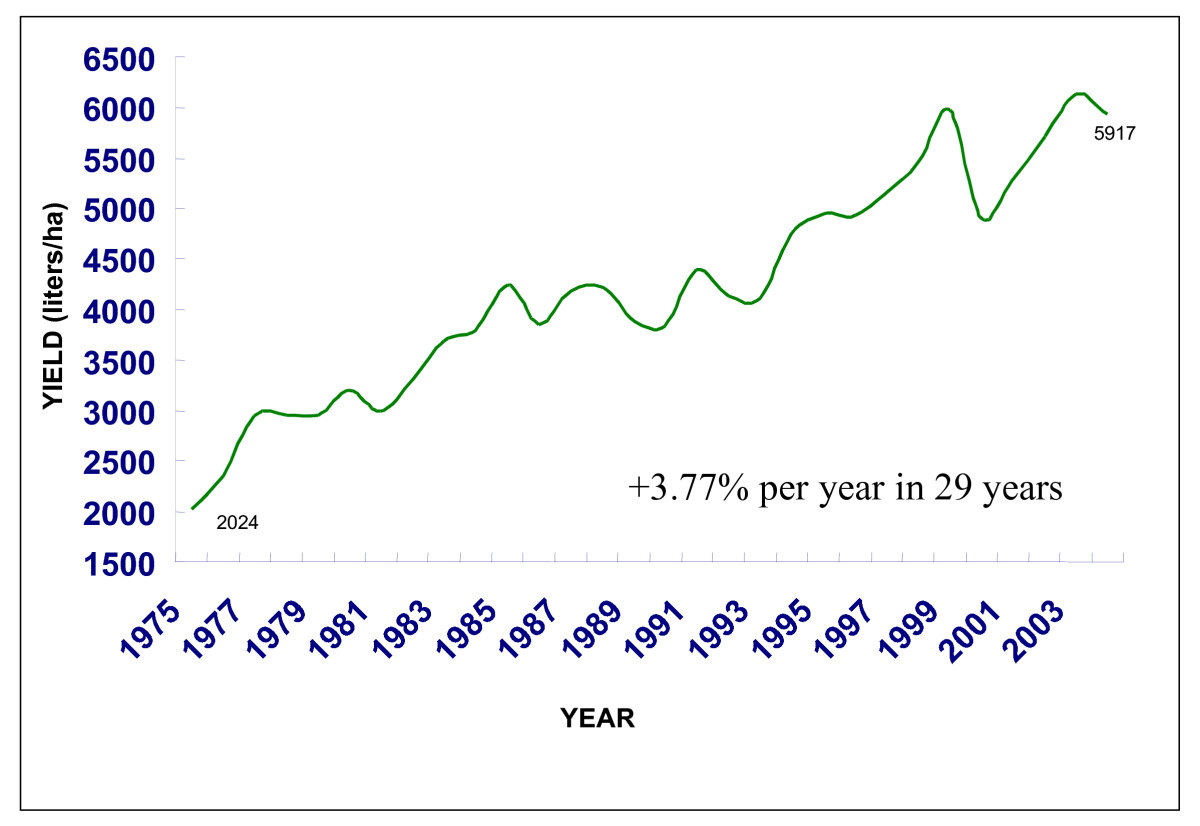
Evolution of the ethanol productivity per hectare of sugarcane planted in Brazil between 1975 and 2004. Source: Goldemberg (2008).

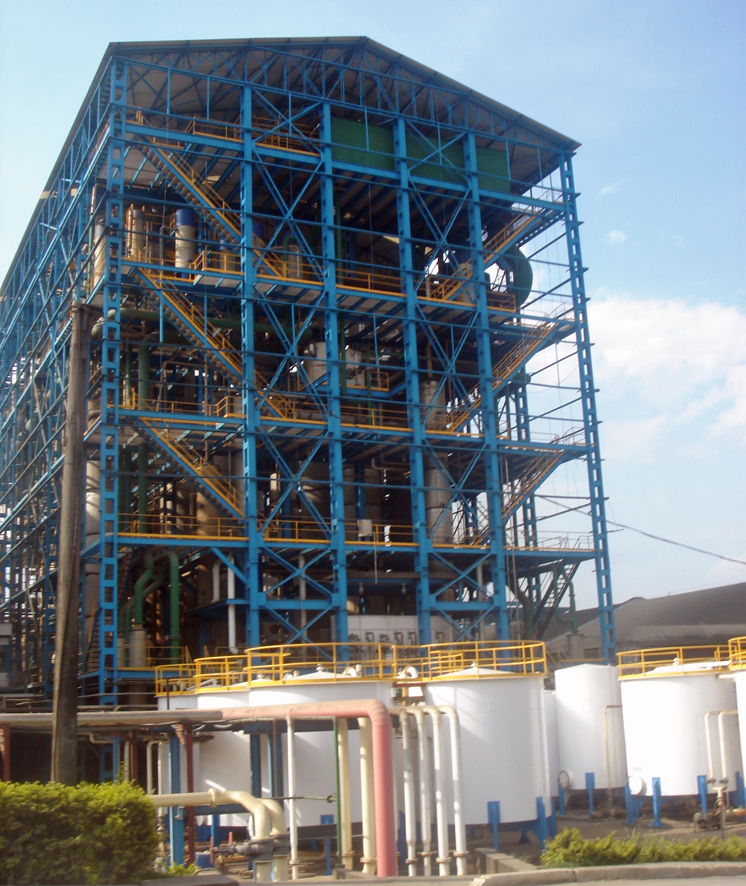
Typical ethanol distillery and dehydration facility, Piracicaba, São Paulo State

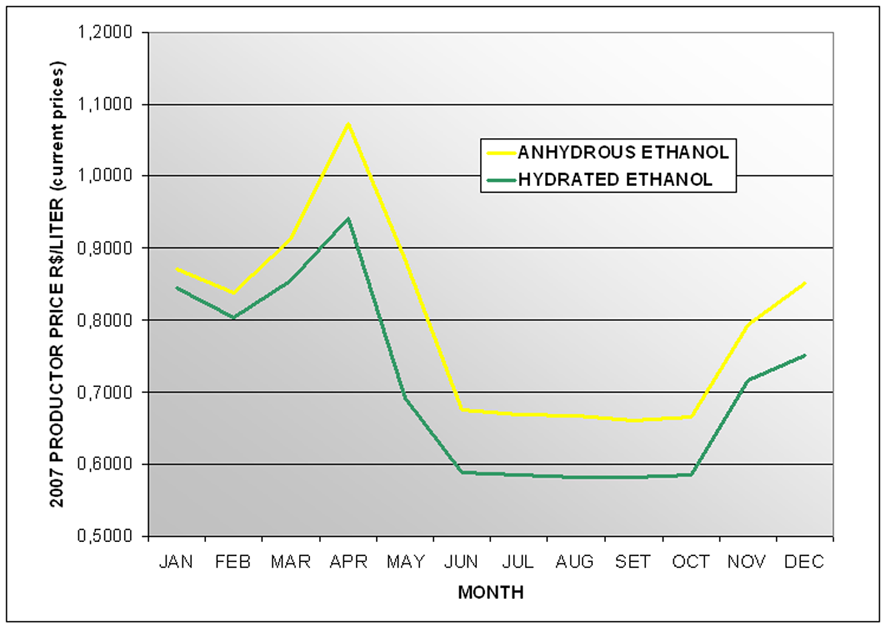
Variation of ethanol prices to producers in 2007 reflecting the harvest season supply. Yellow is for anhydrous ethanol and green is for hydrated ethanol (R$ per liter).

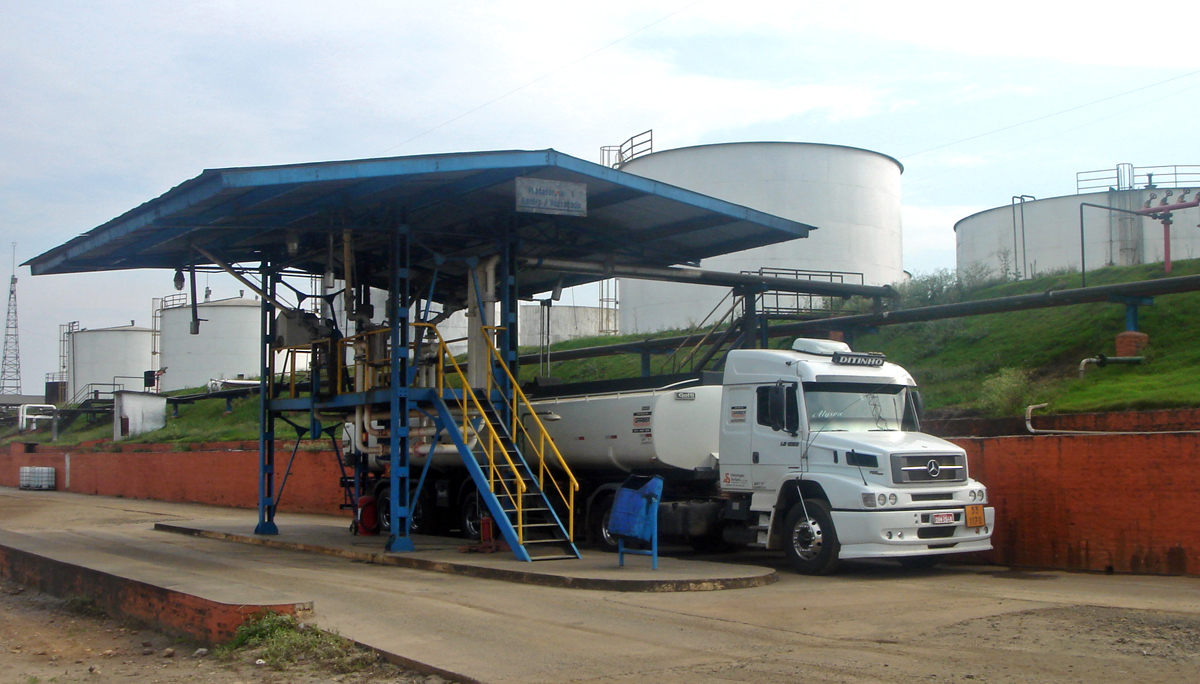
Ethanol fuel ready for distribution, Piracicaba, São Paulo State

A key aspect for the development of the ethanol industry in Brazil was the investment in agricultural research and development by both the public and private sector. The work of EMBRAPA, the state-owned company in charge for applied research on agriculture, together with research developed by state institutes and universities, especially in the State of São Paulo, have allowed Brazil to become a major innovator in the fields of biotechnology and agronomic practices, resulting in the most efficient agricultural technology for sugarcane cultivation in the world. Efforts have been concentrated in increasing the efficiency of inputs and processes to optimize output per hectare of feedstock, and the result has been a threefold increase of sugarcane yields in 29 years, as Brazilian average ethanol yields went from 2,024 liters per ha in 1975 to 5,917 liters per ha in 2004; allowing the efficiency of ethanol production to grow at a rate of 3.77% per year. Brazilian biotechnologies include the development of sugarcane varieties that have a larger sugar or energy content, one of the main drivers for high yields of ethanol per unit of planted area. The increase of the index total recoverable sugar (TRS) from sugarcane has been very significant, 1.5% per year in the period 1977 to 2004, resulting in an increase from 95 to 140 kg/ha. Innovations in the industrial process have allowed an increase in sugar extraction in the period 1977 to 2003. The average annual improvement was 0.3%; some mills have already reached extraction efficiencies of 98%.

Biotechnology research and genetic improvement have led to the development of strains that are more resistant to disease, bacteria, and pests, and also have the capacity to respond to different environments, thus allowing the expansion of sugarcane cultivation to areas previously considered inadequate for such cultures. By 2008 more than 500 sugarcane varieties are cultivated in Brazil, and 51 of them were released just during the last ten years. Four research programs, two private and two public, are devoted to further genetic improvement. Since the mid nineties, Brazilian biotechnology laboratories have developed transgenic varieties, still non commerciallized. Identification of 40,000 cane genes was completed in 2003 and there are a couple dozen research groups working on the functional genome, still on the experimental phase, but commercial results are expected within five years.

Also, there is ongoing research regarding sugarcane biological nitrogen fixation, with the most promising plant varieties showing yields three times the national average in soils of very low fertility, thus avoiding nitrogenous fertilization. There is also research for the development of second-generation or cellulosic ethanol. In São Paulo state an increase of 12% in sugar cane yield and 6.4% in sugar content is expected over the next decade. This advance combined with an expected 6.2% improvement in fermentation efficiency and 2% in sugar extraction, may increase ethanol yields by 29%, raising average ethanol productivity to 9,000 liters/ha. Approximately US$50 million has recently been allocated for research and projects focused on advancing the obtention of ethanol from sugarcane in São Paulo state.

=== Production process ===
Sucrose extracted from sugarcane accounts for little more than 30% of the chemical energy stored in the harvested parts of the mature plant; 35% is in the leaves and stem tips, which are left in the fields during harvest, and 35% are in the fibrous material (bagasse) left over from pressing. Most of the industrial processing of sugarcane in Brazil is done through a very integrated production chain, allowing sugar production, industrial ethanol processing, and electricity generation from byproducts. The typical steps for large-scale production of sugar and ethanol include milling, electricity generation, fermentation, distillation of ethanol, and dehydration.

==== Milling and refining ====
Once harvested, sugarcane is usually transported to the plant by semi-trailer trucks. After quality control, sugarcane is washed, chopped, and shredded by revolving knives; the feedstock is fed to and extracted by a set of mill combinations to collect a juice, called garapa in Brazil, that contain 10–15% sucrose, and bagasse, the fiber residue. The main objective of the milling process is to extract the largest possible amount of sucrose from the cane, and a secondary but important objective is the production of bagasse with a low moisture content as boiler fuel, as bagasse is burned for electricity generation (see below), allowing the plant to be self-sufficient in energy and to generate electricity for the local power grid. The cane juice or garapa is then filtered and treated by chemicals and pasteurized. Before evaporation, the juice is filtered once again, producing vinasse, a fluid rich in organic compounds. The syrup resulting from evaporation is then precipitated by crystallization producing a mixture of clear crystals surrounded by molasses. A centrifuge is used to separate the sugar from molasses, and the crystals are washed by addition of steam, after which the crystals are dried by an airflow. Upon cooling, sugar crystallizes out of the syrup. From this point, the sugar refining process continues to produce different grades of sugar, and the molasses continue a separate process to produce ethanol.

==== Fermentation, distillation and dehydration ====
The resulting molasses are treated to become a sterilized molasse free of impurities, ready to be fermented. In the fermentation process sugars are transformed into ethanol by addition of yeast. Fermentation time varies from four to twelve hours resulting in an alcohol content of 7–10% by total volume (°GL), called fermented wine. The yeast is recovered from this wine through a centrifuge. Making use of the different boiling points the alcohol in the fermented wine is separated from the main resting solid components. The remaining product is hydrated ethanol with a concentration of 96°GL, the highest concentration of ethanol that can be achieved via azeotropic distillation, and by national specification can contain up to 4.9% of water by volume. This hydrous ethanol is the fuel used by ethanol-only and flex vehicles in the country. Further dehydration is normally done by addition of chemicals, up to the specified 99.7°GL in order to produce anhydrous ethanol, which is used for blending with pure gasoline to obtain the country's E25 mandatory blend. The additional processing required to convert hydrated into anhydrous ethanol increases the cost of the fuel, as in 2007 the average producer price difference between the two was around 14% for São Paulo State. This production price difference, though small, contributes to the competitiveness of the hydrated ethanol (E100) used in Brazil, not only with regard to local gasoline prices but also as compared to other countries such as the United States and Sweden, that only use anhydrous ethanol for their flex fuel fleet.

==== Electricity generation from bagasse ====
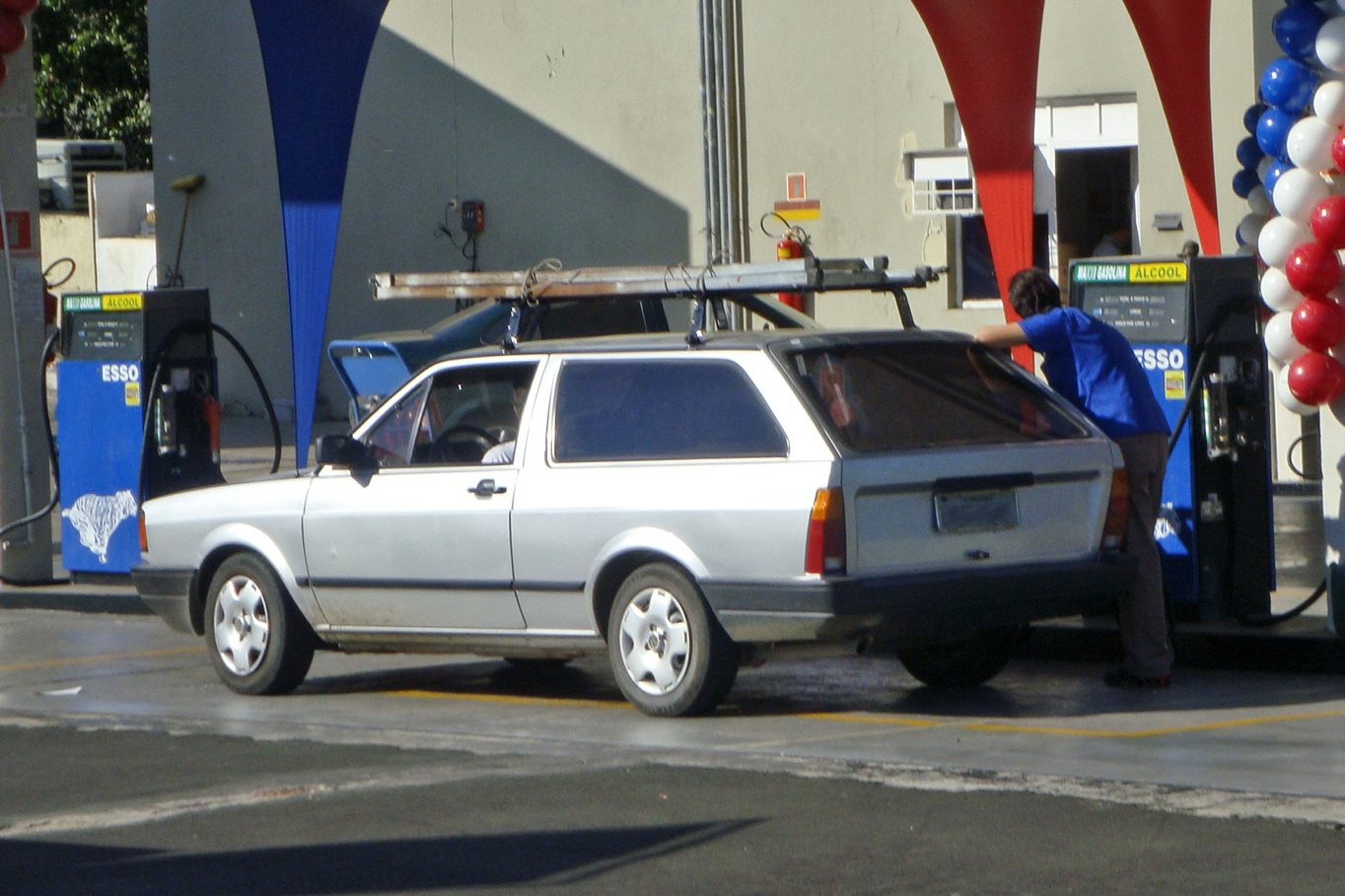
Neat ethanol car fueling E100 at a Piracicaba gas station, São Paulo

Since the early days, bagasse was burnt in the plant to provide the energy required for the industrial part of the process. Today, the Brazilian best practice uses high-pressure boilers that increases energy recovery, allowing most sugar-ethanol plants to be energetically self-sufficient and even sell surplus electricity to utilities. By 2000, the total amount of sugarcane bagasse produced per year was 50 million tons/dry basis out of more than 300 million tons of harvested sugarcane. Several authors estimated a potential power generation from the use of sugarcane bagasse ranging from 1,000 to 9,000 MW, depending on the technology used and the use of harvest trash. One utility in São Paulo is buying more than 1% of its electricity from sugar mills, with a production capacity of 600 MW for self-use and 100 MW for sale. According to analysis from Frost & Sullivan, Brazil's sugarcane bagasse used for power generation has reached 3.0 GW in 2007, and it is expected to reach 12.2 GW in 2014. The analysis also found that sugarcane bagasse cogeneration accounts for 3% of the total Brazilian energy matrix. The energy is especially valuable to utilities because it is produced mainly in the dry season when hydroelectric dams are running low.

According to a study commissioned by the Dutch government in 2006 to evaluate the sustainability of Brazilian bioethanol "there are also substantial gains possible in the efficiency of electricity use and generation: The electricity used for distillery operations has been estimated at 12.9 kWh/tonne cane, with a best available technology rate of 9.6 kWh/tonne cane. For electricity generation the efficiency could be increased from 18 kWh/tonne cane presently, to 29.1 kWh/tonne cane maximum. The production of surplus electricity could in theory be increased from 5.3 kWh/tonne cane to 19 kWh/tonne cane."

==== Electric generation from ethanol ====
Brazil has several experimental programs for the production of electricity using sugar cane ethanol as fuel. A joint venture of General Electric and Petrobras is operating one commercial pilot plant in Juiz de Fora, Minas Gerais.

==== Overall energy use ====
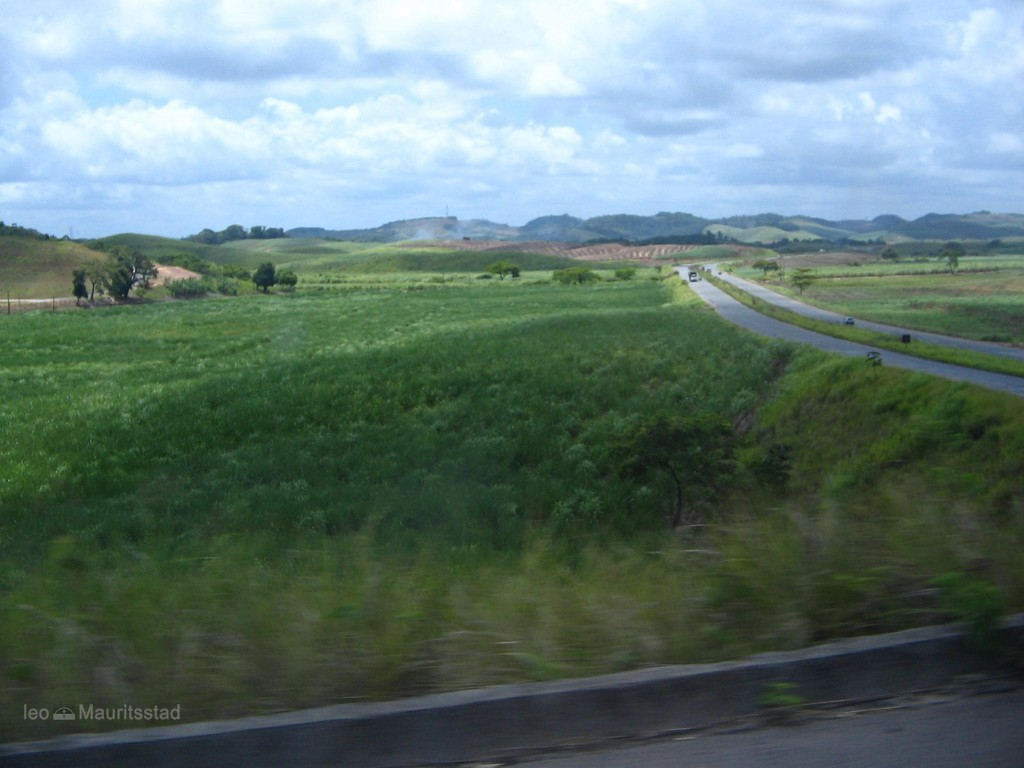
Sugarcane plantation in the State of Pernambuco.

Energy-use associated with the production of sugarcane ethanol derives from three primary sources: the agricultural sector, the industrial sector, and the distribution sector. In the agricultural sector, 35.98 GJ of energy are used to plant, maintain, and harvest one hectare (10,000 m^{2}) of sugarcane for usable biofuel. This includes energy from numerous inputs, including nitrogen, phosphate, potassium oxide, lime, seed, herbicides, insecticides, labor and diesel fuel. The industrial sector, which includes the milling and refining sugarcane and the production of ethanol fuel, uses 3.63 GJ of energy and generates 155.57 GJ of energy per hectare of sugarcane plantation. Scientists estimate that the potential power generated from the cogeneration of bagasse could range from 1,000 to 9,000 MW, depending on harvest and technology factors. In Brazil, this is about 3% of the total energy needed. The burning of bagasse can generate 18 kilowatt-hours, or 64.7 MJ per Mg of sugarcane. Distillery facilities require about 45 MJ to operate, leaving a surplus energy supply of 19.3 MJ, or 5.4 kWh. In terms of distribution, researchers calculates sugarcane ethanol's transport energy requirement to be 0.44 GJ per cubic-meter, thus one hectare of land would require 2.82 GJ of energy for successful transport and distribution. After taking all three sectors into account, the EROEI (Energy Return over Energy Invested) for sugarcane ethanol is about 8.

There are several improvements to the industrial processes, such as adopting a hydrolysis process to produce ethanol instead of surplus electricity, or the use of advanced boiler and turbine technology to increase the electricity yield, or a higher use of excess bagasse and harvest trash currently left behind in the fields, that together with various other efficiency improvements in sugarcane farming and the distribution chain have the potential to allow further efficiency increases, translating into higher yields, lower production costs, and also further improvements in the energy balance and the reduction of greenhouse gas emissions.

=== Exports ===
Brazilian ethanol exports by selected country and region (2005–2007) (Millions of liters)
| Country/Region^{(1)} | 2007 | % | 2006 | % | 2005 | % |
|---|---|---|---|---|---|---|
| United States^{(2)} | 932.75 | 26.4 | 1,777.43 | 51.9 | 270.97 | 10.5 |
| CBI countries^{(3)} | 910.29 | 25.8 | 530.55 | 15.5 | 554.15 | 21.4 |
| Jamaica | 308.97 | | 131.54 | | 133.39 | |
| El Salvador | 224.40 | | 181.14 | | 157.85 | |
| Costa Rica | 170.37 | | 91.26 | | 126.69 | |
| Trinidad and Tobago | 158.87 | | 71.58 | | 36.12 | |
| Mexico | 42.21 | | 50.24 | | 100.10 | |
| European Union | 1,004.17 | 28.4 | 587.31 | 17.1 | 530.73 | 20.5 |
| Netherlands | 808.56 | | 346.61 | | 259.40 | |
| Sweden | 116.47 | | 204.61 | | 245.89 | |
| Japan | 364.00 | 10.3 | 225.40 | 6.6 | 315.39 | 12.2 |
| Nigeria | 122.88 | | 42.68 | | 118.44 | |
| Republic of Korea | 66.69 | | 92.27 | | 216.36 | |
| India | 0 | | 10.07 | | 410.76 | 15.8 |
| Total world exports | 3,532.67 | 100 | 3,426.86 | 100 | 2,592.29 | 100 |
Notes: ^{(1)}Only countries with more than 100,000 liters imports on a given year are shown. ^{(2)}It includes exports to Puerto Rico and U.S. Virgin Islands. ^{(3)} Including Mexico that trades with the U.S. under the North American Free Trade Agreement (NAFTA).

Brazil is the world's largest exporter of ethanol. In 2007 it exported 933.4 million gallons (3,532.7 million liters), representing almost 20% of its production, and accounting for almost 50% of the global exports. Since 2004 Brazilian exporters have as their main customers the United States, Netherlands, Japan, Sweden, Jamaica, El Salvador, Costa Rica, Trinidad and Tobago, Nigeria, Mexico, India, and South Korea.

The countries in the Caribbean Basin import relative high quantities of Brazilian ethanol, but not much is destined for domestic consumption. These countries reprocess the product, usually converting Brazilian hydrated ethanol into anhydrous ethanol, and then re-export it to the United States, gaining value-added and avoiding the 2.5% duty and the US$0.54 per gallon tariff, thanks to the trade agreements and benefits granted by Caribbean Basin Initiative (CBI). This process is limited by a quota, set at 7% of U.S. ethanol consumption. Although direct U.S. exports fell in 2007, imports from four CBI countries almost doubled, increasing from 15.5% in 2006 to 25.8% in 2007, reflecting increasing re-exports to the U.S., thus partially compensating the loss of Brazilian direct exports to the U.S. This situation has caused some concerns in the United States, as it and Brazil are trying to build a partnership to increase ethanol production in Latin American and the Caribbean. As the U.S. is encouraging "new ethanol production in other countries, production that could directly compete with U.S.-produced ethanol".

The U.S., potentially the largest market for Brazilian ethanol imports, currently imposes a tariff on Brazilian ethanol of US$0.54 per gallon in order to encourage domestic ethanol production and protect the budding ethanol industry in the United States. Historically, this tariff was intended to offset the 45 cent per gallon blender's federal tax credit that is applied to ethanol no matter its country of origin. Exports of Brazilian ethanol to the U.S. reached a total of US$1 billion in 2006, an increase of 1,020% over 2005 (US$98 million), but fell significantly in 2007 due to sharp increases in American ethanol production from corn. As shown in the table, the United States remains the largest single importer of Brazilian ethanol exports, though collectively the European Union and the CBI countries now import a similar amount.

A 2010 study by Iowa State University's Center for Agricultural and Rural Development found that removing the U.S. import tariff would result in less than 5% of the United States' ethanol being imported from Brazil. Also a 2010 study by the Congressional Budget Office (CBO) found that the costs to American taxpayers of using a biofuel to reduce gasoline consumption by one gallon are $1.78 for corn ethanol and $3.00 for cellulosic ethanol. In a similar way, and without considering potential indirect land use effects, the costs to taxpayers of reducing greenhouse gas emissions through tax credits are about $750 per metric ton of CO_{2}-equivalent for ethanol and around $275 per metric ton for cellulosic ethanol.

After being renewed several times, the tax credit is set to expire on December 31, 2011, and both the US$0.54 per gallon tariff and US$0.45 per gallon blender's credit have been the subject of contentious debate in Washington, D.C., with ethanol interest groups and politicians staking positions on both sides of the issue. On June 16, 2011, the U.S. Congress approved an amendment to the economic development bill to repeal both the tax credit and the tariff on ethanol, and though this bill has an uncertain future, it is considered a signal that the tax credits will not be renew when they expire at the end of 2011. The eventual elimination of the import tariff is not expect to have significant effects in the short term, because the Brazilian ethanol industry has been having trouble meeting its own domestic demand for ethanol during 2010 and 2011, and Brazil imported some corn ethanol from the U.S. The shortage in supply is due in part to high sugar prices, which make it more profitable for Brazilian producers to sell it as sugar than convert it to ethanol fuel. Also, as a result of the credit crunch caused by the 2008 financial crisis, the expansion of the Brazilian ethanol industry has not been able keep up pace with the accelerated growth of the flex fuel fleet.

As U.S. EPA's 2010 final ruling for the Renewable Fuel Standard designated Brazilian sugarcane ethanol as an advanced biofuel, Brazilian ethanol producers hope this classification will contribute to lift import tariffs both in the U.S. and the rest of the world. Also they expect to increase exports to the U.S., as the blending mandate requires an increasing quota of advanced biofuels, which is not likely to be fulfilled with cellulosic ethanol, and then it would force blenders to import more Brazilian sugarcane-based ethanol, despite the existing 54¢ per gallon tariff on ethanol imported directly from Brazil, or duty-free from the CBI countries that convert Brazilian hydrated ethanol into anhydrous ethanol.

== Prices and effect on oil consumption ==
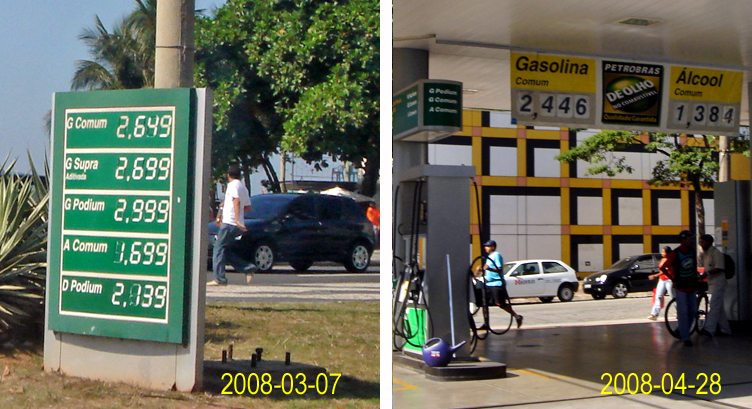
Alcohol and gasoline prices per liter at Rio de Janeiro (left) and São Paulo (right), corresponding to a price ratio of E100 ethanol to E25 gasoline of 0.64 and 0.56

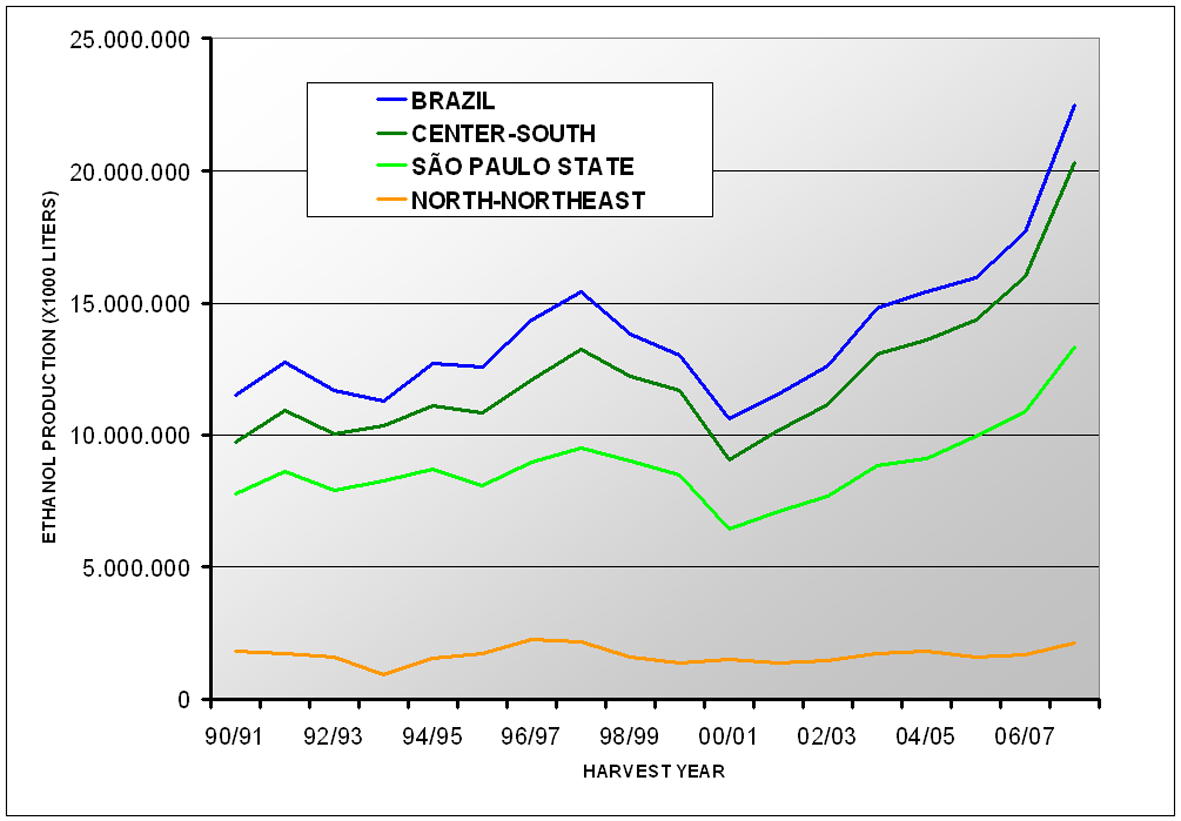
Historical variation of ethanol production by region from 1990/91 to 2006/07 (harvest year). Light green is the production for the State of São Paulo.

Most automobiles in Brazil run either on hydrous alcohol (E100) or on gasohol (E25 blend), as the mixture of 25% anhydrous ethanol with gasoline is mandatory in the entire country. Since 2003, dual-fuel ethanol flex vehicles that run on any proportion of hydrous ethanol and gasoline have been gaining popularity. These have electronic sensors that detect the type of fuel and adjust the engine combustion to match, so users can choose the cheapest available fuel. Sales of flex fuel vehicles reached 9.3 million by December 2009, representing 39% of the passenger vehicle fleet. By mid-2010 there were 70 flex models available in the market and production by December 2010 reached more than 12.5 million flex vehicles including more than 500 thousand flex fuel motorcycles.

Due to the lower energy content of ethanol fuel, full flex-fuel vehicles get fewer miles per gallon. Ethanol price has to be 25–30% cheaper per gallon to reach the break even point. As a rule of thumb, Brazilian consumers are frequently advised by the media to use more alcohol than gasoline in their mix only when ethanol prices are 30% lower or more than gasoline, as ethanol price fluctuates heavily depending on the harvest yields and seasonal fluctuation of sugarcane harvest.

Since 2005, ethanol prices have been very competitive without subsidies, even with gasoline prices kept constant in local currency since mid-2005, at a time when oil was just approaching US$60 a barrel. However, Brazilian gasoline taxes are high, around 54 percent, while ethanol fuel taxes are lower and vary between 12% and 30%, depending on the state. As of October 2008 the average price of E25 gasoline was $4.39 per gallon while the average price for ethanol was US$2.69 per gallon. This differential in taxation favors ethanol fuel consumption, and by the end of July 2008, when oil prices were close to its latest peak and the Brazilian real exchange rate to the US dollar was close to its most recent minimum, the average gasoline retail price at the pump in Brazil reached US$6.00 per gallon. The price ratio between gasoline and ethanol fuel has been well above 30 percent during this period for most states, except during low sugar cane supply between harvests and for states located far away from the ethanol production centers. According to Brazilian producers, ethanol can remain competitive if the price of oil does not fall below US$30 a barrel.

By 2008 consumption of ethanol fuel by the Brazilian fleet of light vehicles, as pure ethanol and in gasohol, is replacing gasoline at the rate of about 27,000 cubic meters per day, and by February 2008 the combined consumption of anhydrous and hydrated ethanol fuel surpassed 50 percent of the fuel that would be needed to run the light vehicle fleet on pure gasoline alone. Monthly consumption of anhydrous ethanol for the mandatory E25 blend, together with hydrous ethanol used by flex vehicles, reached 1.432 billion liters, while pure gasoline consumption was 1.411 billion liters. Despite this volumetric parity, when expressed in terms of energy equivalent (toe), sugarcane ethanol represented 17.6 percent of the country's total energy consumption by the transport sector in 2008, while gasoline represented 23.3 percent and diesel 49.2 percent.

For the first time since 2003 sales of hydrous ethanol fell in 2010, with a decrease of 8.5 percent as compared to 2009. Total consumption of both hydrous and anhydrous ethanol fell by 2.9 percent while gasoline consumption increased by 17.5 percent. Despite the reduction in ethanol consumption, total ethanol sales reached 22.2 billion liters while pure gasoline consumption was 22.7 billion liters, keeping the market share for each fuel close to 50 percent. The decrease in hydrous ethanol consumption was due mainly to high sugar prices in the international markets, which reached a 30-year high in 2010. This peak in sugar prices caused sugarcane processing plants to produce more sugar than ethanol, and as supply contracted, E100 prices increased to the point that several times during 2010 the price of hydrous ethanol was less than 30 percent cheaper than gasoline. Another factor that contributed to this shift was the increase sales of imported gasoline only vehicles that took place during 2010.

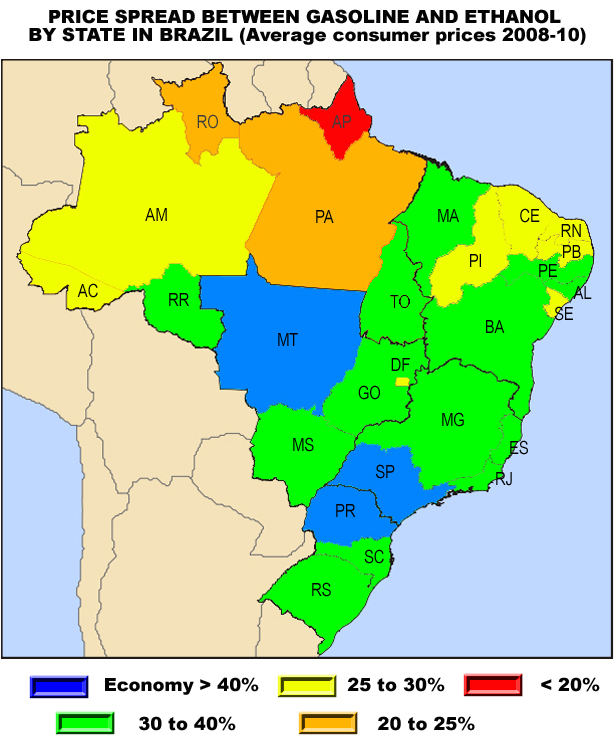
| Consumer price spread between E25 gasoline and E100 by state. Red and orange show states with average prices below the break even range. Ethanol price should be between 25 and 30% cheaper than gasoline to compensate its lower fuel economy. | State | Average retail price (R$/liter) | | Price spread E25 - E100 | State | Average retail price (R$/liter) | | Price spread E25 - E100 | State | Average retail price (R$/liter) | | Price spread E25 - E100 |
|---|---|---|---|---|---|---|---|---|---|---|---|---|
| Consumer price spread between E25 gasoline and E100 by state. Red and orange show states with average prices below the break even range. Ethanol price should be between 25 and 30% cheaper than gasoline to compensate its lower fuel economy. | State | E100 | E25 | (%) | State | E100 | E25 | (%) | State | E100 | E25 | (%) |
| Consumer price spread between E25 gasoline and E100 by state. Red and orange show states with average prices below the break even range. Ethanol price should be between 25 and 30% cheaper than gasoline to compensate its lower fuel economy. | Acre (AC) | 2.080 | 2.943 | 29.32 | Maranhão (MA) | 1.709 | 2.628 | 34.97 | Rio de Janeiro (RJ) | 1.676 | 2.531 | 33.78 |
| Consumer price spread between E25 gasoline and E100 by state. Red and orange show states with average prices below the break even range. Ethanol price should be between 25 and 30% cheaper than gasoline to compensate its lower fuel economy. | Alagoas (AL) | 1.844 | 2.766 | 33.33 | Mato Grosso (MT) | 1.452 | 2.677 | 45.76 | Rio Grande do Norte (RN) | 1.940 | 2.669 | 27.31 |
| Consumer price spread between E25 gasoline and E100 by state. Red and orange show states with average prices below the break even range. Ethanol price should be between 25 and 30% cheaper than gasoline to compensate its lower fuel economy. | Amapá (AP) | 2.246 | 2.686 | 16.38 | Mato Grosso do Sul (MS) | 1.683 | 2.676 | 37.11 | Rio Grande do Sul (RS) | 1.779 | 2.574 | 30.89 |
| Consumer price spread between E25 gasoline and E100 by state. Red and orange show states with average prices below the break even range. Ethanol price should be between 25 and 30% cheaper than gasoline to compensate its lower fuel economy. | Amazonas (AM) | 2.773 | 2.452 | 27.69 | Minas Gerais (MG) | 1.610 | 2.377 | 32.27 | Rondônia (RR) | 1.839 | 2.669 | 31.10 |
| Consumer price spread between E25 gasoline and E100 by state. Red and orange show states with average prices below the break even range. Ethanol price should be between 25 and 30% cheaper than gasoline to compensate its lower fuel economy. | Bahia (BA) | 1.630 | 2.522 | 35.37 | Pará (PA) | 2.120 | 2.772 | 23.52 | Roraima (RO) | 2.154 | 2.710 | 20.52 |
| Consumer price spread between E25 gasoline and E100 by state. Red and orange show states with average prices below the break even range. Ethanol price should be between 25 and 30% cheaper than gasoline to compensate its lower fuel economy. | Distrito Federal (DF) | 1.884 | 2.586 | 27.15 | Paraíba (PB) | 1.883 | 2.553 | 26.24 | Santa Catarina (SC) | 1.697 | 2.556 | 33.61 |
| Consumer price spread between E25 gasoline and E100 by state. Red and orange show states with average prices below the break even range. Ethanol price should be between 25 and 30% cheaper than gasoline to compensate its lower fuel economy. | Ceará (CE) | 1.768 | 2.510 | 29.56 | Paraná (PR) | 1.445 | 2.429 | 40.51 | São Paulo (SP) | 1.306 | 2.398 | 45.54 |
| Consumer price spread between E25 gasoline and E100 by state. Red and orange show states with average prices below the break even range. Ethanol price should be between 25 and 30% cheaper than gasoline to compensate its lower fuel economy. | Espírito Santo (ES) | 1.795 | 2.662 | 32.57 | Pernambuco (PE) | 1.700 | 2.573 | 33.93 | Sergipe (SE) | 1.888 | 2.518 | 25.02 |
| Consumer price spread between E25 gasoline and E100 by state. Red and orange show states with average prices below the break even range. Ethanol price should be between 25 and 30% cheaper than gasoline to compensate its lower fuel economy. | Goiás (GO) | 1.581 | 2.565 | 38.36 | Piauí (PI) | 1.927 | 2.655 | 27.42 | Tocantins (TO) | 1.708 | 2.748 | 37.85 |
| Consumer price spread between E25 gasoline and E100 by state. Red and orange show states with average prices below the break even range. Ethanol price should be between 25 and 30% cheaper than gasoline to compensate its lower fuel economy. | Country average | 1.513 | 2.511 | 39.75 | Source: Agência Nacional do Petróleo (ANP). Average retail prices for week of October 26, 2008, to November 1, 2008. Note: Data is presented in local currency because the exchange rate for the Brazilian real has fluctuated heavily since the 2008 financial crisis. Exchange rate for October 31, 2008, was US1 = R$ 2.16. |

== Comparison with the United States ==
Brazil's sugar cane-based industry is more efficient than the U.S. corn-based industry. Sugar cane ethanol has an energy balance seven times greater than ethanol produced from corn. Brazilian distillers are able to produce ethanol for 22 cents per liter, compared with the 30 cents per liter for corn-based ethanol. U.S. corn-derived ethanol costs 30% more because the corn starch must first be converted to sugar before being distilled into alcohol. Despite this cost differential in production, the U.S. did not import more Brazilian ethanol because of U.S. trade barriers corresponding to a tariff of 54-cent per gallon, first imposed in 1980, but kept to offset the 45-cent per gallon blender's federal tax credit that is applied to ethanol no matter its country of origin. In 2011 the U.S. Congress decided not to extend the tariff and the tax credit, and as a result both ended on December 31, 2011. During these three decades the ethanol industry was awarded an estimated US$45 billion in subsidies and US$6 billion just in 2011.

Sugarcane cultivation requires a tropical or subtropical climate, with a minimum of 600 mm (24 in) of annual rainfall. Sugarcane is one of the most efficient photosynthesizers in the plant kingdom, able to convert up to 2% of incident solar energy into biomass. Sugarcane production in the United States occurs in Florida, Louisiana, Hawaii, and Texas. The first three plants to produce sugarcane-based ethanol are expected to go online in Louisiana by mid-2009. Sugar mill plants in Lacassine, St. James and Bunkie were converted to sugar cane-based ethanol production using Colombian technology in order to make possible a profitable ethanol production. These three plants will produce 100 million gallons (378.5 million liters) of ethanol within five years. By 2009 two other sugarcane ethanol production projects are being developed in Kauai, Hawaii and Imperial Valley, California.

Comparison of key characteristics between the ethanol industries in the United States and Brazil
| Characteristic | Brazil | U.S. | Units/comments |
| Feedstock | Sugar cane | Maize | Main cash crop for ethanol production, the US has less than 2% from other crops. |
| Total ethanol fuel production (2017) | 7,06 | 15,80 | Million U.S. liquid gallons. |
| Total arable land | 355 | 270^{(1)} | Million hectares. |
| Total area used for ethanol crop (2006) | 3.6 (1%) | 10 (3.7%) | Million hectares (% total arable). |
| Productivity per hectare | 6,800–8,000 | 3,800–4,000 | Liters of ethanol per hectare. Brazil is 727 to 870 gal/acre (2006), US is 321 to 424 gal/acre (2003). |
| Energy balance (input energy productivity) | 8.3 to 10.2 | 1.3 to 1.6 | Ratio of the energy obtained from ethanol/energy expended in its production. |
| Estimated GHG emissions reduction | 86–90%^{(2)} | 10–30%^{(2)} | % GHGs avoided by using ethanol instead of gasoline, using existing crop land (No ILUC). |
| EPA's estimated 2022 GHG reduction for RFS2. | 61%^{(3)} | 21% | Average % GHGs change by using ethanol as compared to gasoline, considering direct and indirect land use change effects. |
| CARB's full life-cycle carbon intensity | 73.40 | 105.10^{(4)} | Grams of CO_{2} equivalent released per MJ of energy produced, includes indirect land use changes. |
| Estimated payback time for GHG emissions | 17 years^{(5)} | 93 years^{(5)} | Brazilian cerrado for sugarcane and US grassland for corn. Land use change scenarios by Fargione. |
| Total flex-fuel vehicles produced/sold | 16.3 million | 10 million | All fleets as of December 2011. The Brazilian fleet includes 1.5 million flex fuel motorcycles. USDOE estimates that in 2009 only 504,297 flex-fuel vehicles were regularly fueled with E85 in the US. |
| Ethanol fueling stations in the country | 35,017 (100%) | 2,326 (1%) | As % of total gas stations in the country. Brazil by December 2007. U.S. by July 2010. (170,000 total) |
| Ethanol's share in the gasoline market | 50%^{(6)} | 10% | As % of total consumption on a volumetric basis. Brazil as of April 2008. U.S. as of December 2011. |
| Cost of production (USD/gallon) | 0.83 | 1.14 | 2006/2007 for Brazil (22¢/liter), 2004 for U.S. (35¢/liter). |
Notes: (1) Only contiguous U.S., excludes Alaska. (2) Assuming no land use change. (3) Estimate is for U.S. consumption and sugarcane ethanol is imported from Brazil. Emissions from sea transport are included. Both estimates include land transport within the U.S. (4) CARB estimate for Midwest corn ethanol. California's gasoline carbon intensity is 95.86 blended with 10% ethanol. (5) Assuming direct land use change only.

== Ethanol diplomacy ==
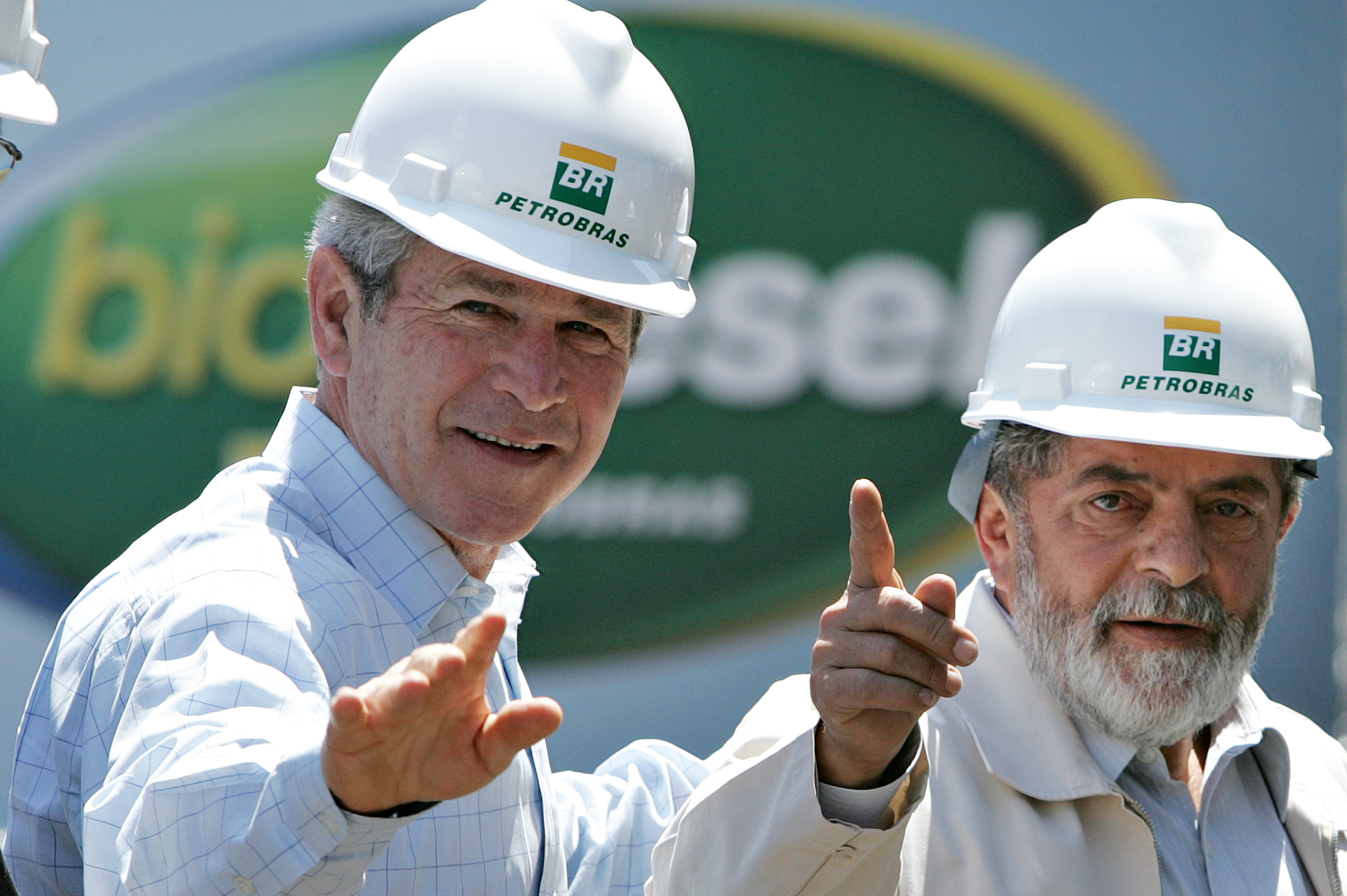
Presidents Luiz Inácio Lula da Silva and George W. Bush during Bush's visit to Brazil, March 2007

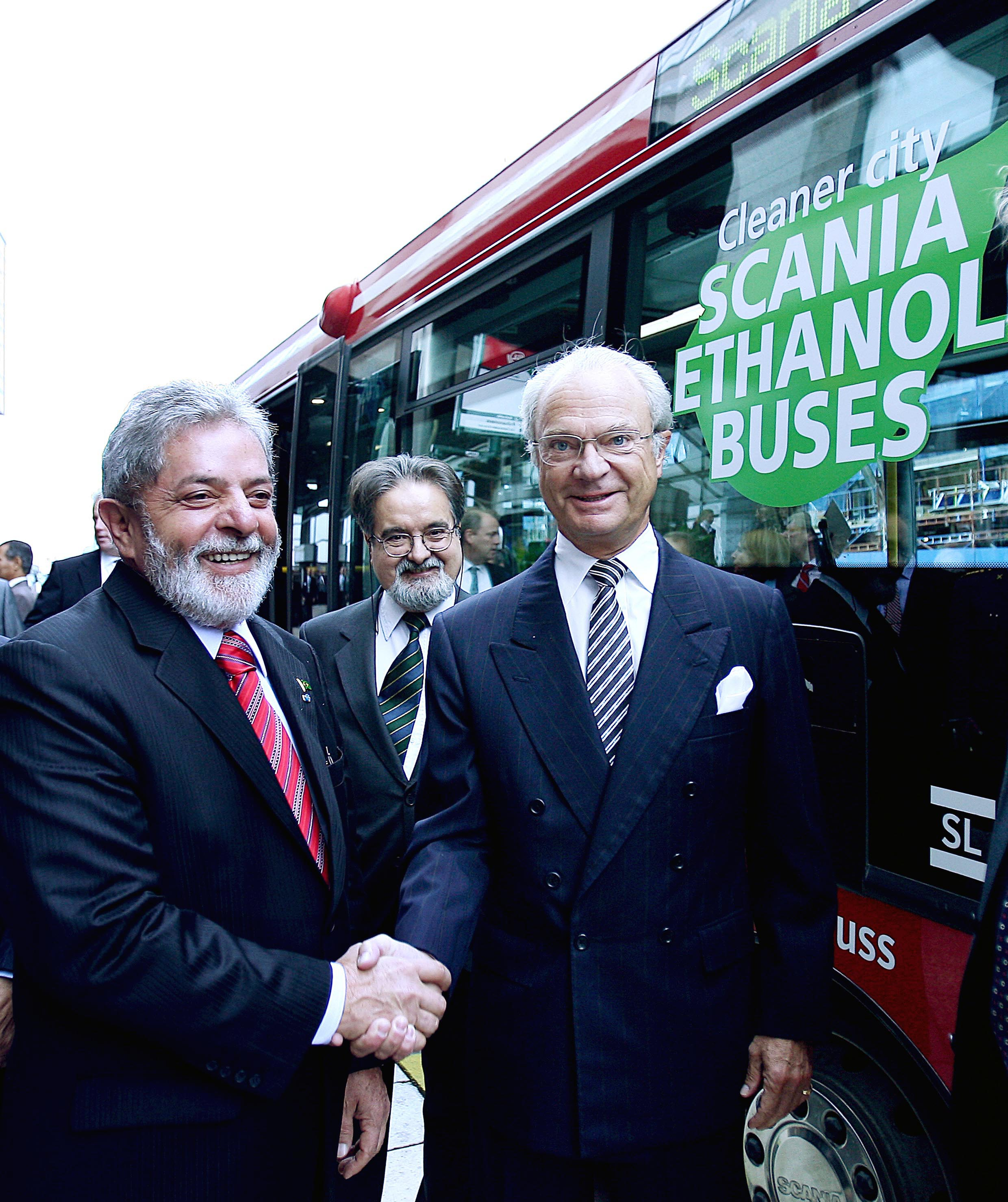
President Luiz Inácio Lula da Silva and King Carl XVI Gustaf of Sweden inspecting one of the 400 buses running on ED95 in Stockholm

In March 2007, "ethanol diplomacy" was the focus of President George W. Bush's Latin American tour, in which he and Brazil's president, Luiz Inácio Lula da Silva, were seeking to promote the production and use of sugar cane–based ethanol throughout Latin America and the Caribbean. The two countries also agreed to share technology and set international standards for biofuels. The Brazilian sugar cane technology transfer will permit various Central American countries, such as Honduras, Nicaragua, Costa Rica and Panama, several Caribbean countries, and various Andean Countries tariff-free trade with the U.S. thanks to existing concessionary trade agreements.

Even though the U.S. has imposed a US$0.54 tariff on every gallon of imported ethanol since 1980, the Caribbean nations and Central American countries are exempt from such duties based on the benefits granted by the Caribbean Basin Initiative (CBI). CBI provisions allow tariff-free access to the US market from ethanol produced from foreign feedstock (outside CBI countries) up to 7% of the previous year US consumption. Also additional quotas are allowed if the beneficiary countries produce at least 30% of the ethanol from local feedstocks up to an additional 35 million gallons (132.5 million liters). Thus, several countries have been importing hydrated ethanol from Brazil, processing it at local distilleries to dehydrate it, and then re-exporting it as anhydrous ethanol. American farmers have complained about this loophole to legally bypass the tariff. The 2005 Dominican Republic – Central America Free Trade Agreement (CAFTA) maintained the benefits granted by the CBI, and CAFTA provisions established country-specific shares for Costa Rica and El Salvador within the overall quota. An initial annual allowance was established for each country, with gradually increasing annual levels of access to the US market. The expectation is that using Brazilian technology for refining sugar cane–based ethanol, such countries could become net exporters to the United States in the short-term. In August 2007, Brazil's president toured Mexico and several countries in Central America and the Caribbean to promote Brazilian ethanol technology.

The Memorandum of Understanding (MOU) that the American and Brazilian presidents signed in March 2007 may bring Brazil and the United States closer on energy policy, but it is not clear whether there has been substantive progress implementing the three pillars found in that agreement.

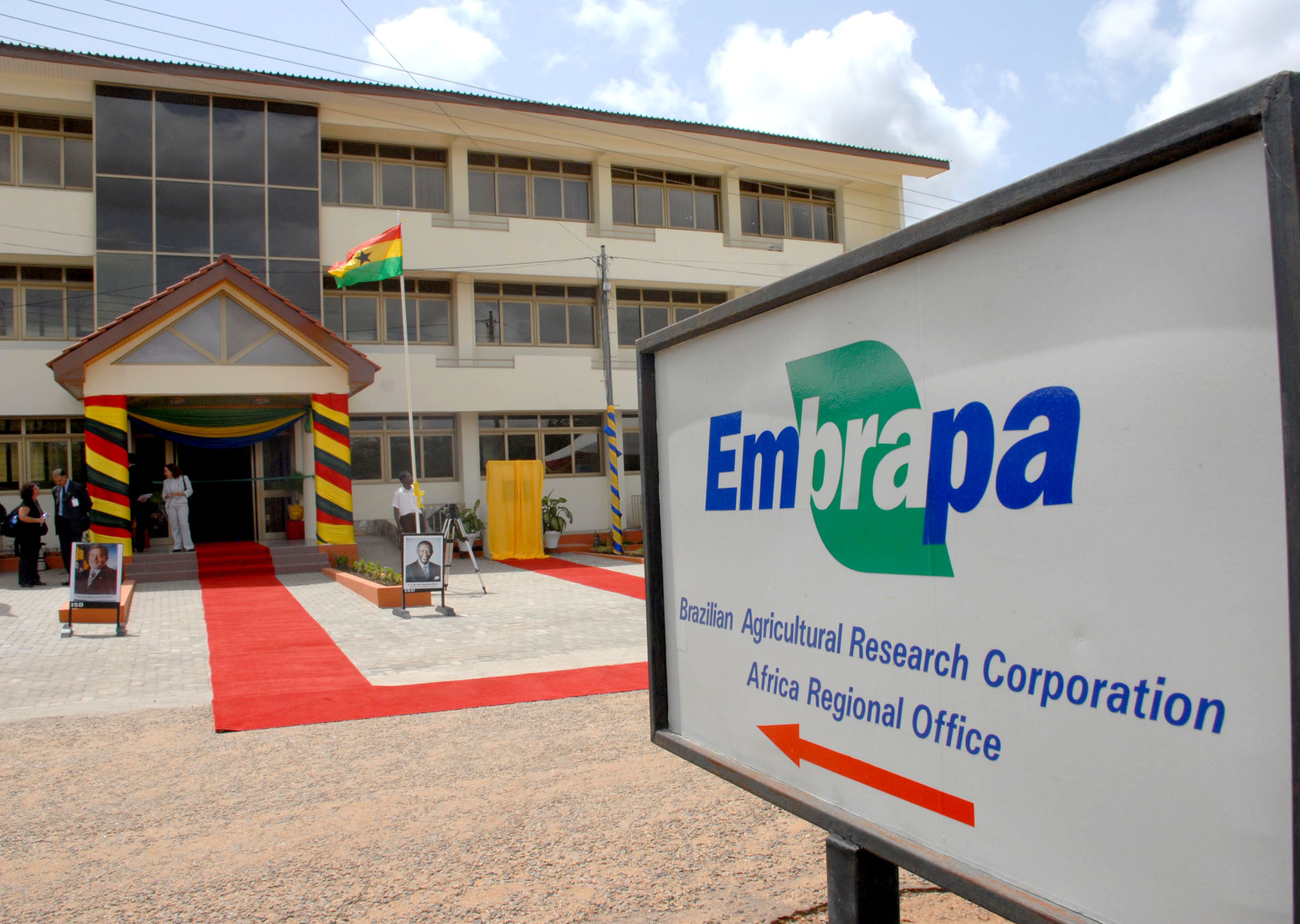
EMBRAPA's African Regional Office in Ghana

Brazil has also extended its technical expertise to several African countries, including Ghana, Mozambique, Angola, and Kenya. This effort is led by EMBRAPA, the state-owned company in charge for applied research on agriculture, and responsible for most of the achievements in increasing sugarcane productivity during the last thirty years. Another 15 African countries have shown interest in receiving Brazilian technical aid to improve sugarcane productivity and to produce ethanol efficiently. Brazil also has bilateral cooperation agreements with several other countries in Europe and Asia.

As President Lula wrote for The Economist regarding Brazil's global agenda:

Brazil's ethanol and biodiesel programmes are a benchmark for alternative and renewable fuel sources. Partnerships are being established with developing countries seeking to follow Brazil's achievements—a 675m-tonne reduction of greenhouse-gas emissions, a million new jobs and a drastic reduction in dependence on imported fossil fuels coming from a dangerously small number of producer countries. All of this has been accomplished without compromising food security, which, on the contrary, has benefited from rising agricultural output ... We are setting up offices in developing countries interested in benefiting from Brazilian know-how in this field.

== Environmental and social impacts ==
=== Environmental effects ===
==== Benefits ====
Ethanol produced from sugarcane provides energy that is renewable and less carbon intensive than oil. Bioethanol reduces air pollution thanks to its cleaner emissions, and also contributes to mitigate global warming by reducing greenhouse gas emissions.

===== Energy balance =====
One of the main concerns about bioethanol production is the energy balance, the total amount of energy input into the process compared to the energy released by burning the resulting ethanol fuel. This balance considers the full cycle of producing the fuel, as cultivation, transportation and production require energy, including the use of oil and fertilizers. A comprehensive life cycle assessment commissioned by the State of São Paulo found that Brazilian sugarcane-based ethanol has a favorable energy balance, varying from 8.3 for average conditions to 10.2 for best practice production. This means that for average conditions one unit of fossil-fuel energy is required to create 8.3 energy units from the resulting ethanol. These findings have been confirmed by other studies.

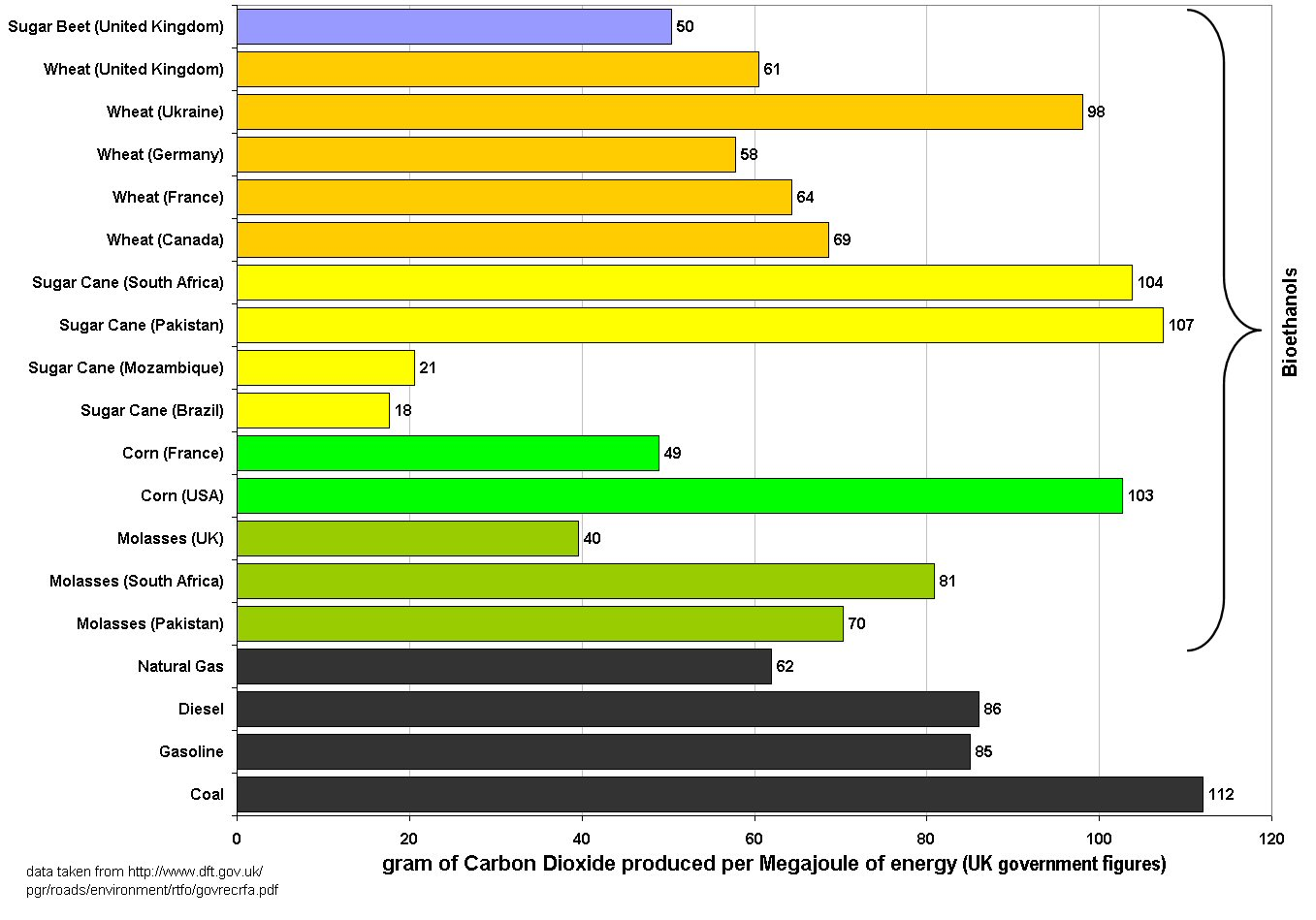
UK estimates for the carbon intensity of bioethanol and fossil fuels. As shown, Brazilian ethanol from sugarcane is the most efficient biofuel currently under commercial production in terms of GHG emission reduction.

===== Greenhouse gas emissions =====
Another benefit of bioethanol is the reduction of greenhouse gas emissions as compared to gasoline, because as much carbon dioxide is taken up by the growing plants as is produced when the bioethanol is burnt, with a zero theoretical net contribution. Several studies have shown that sugarcane-based ethanol reduces greenhouse gases by 86 to 90% if there is no significant land use change, and ethanol from sugarcane is regarded the most efficient biofuel currently under commercial production in terms of GHG emission reduction.

However, two studies published in 2008 are critical of previous assessments of greenhouse gas emissions reduction, as the authors considered that previous studies did not take into account the effect of land use changes. Recent assessments carried out in 2009 by the U.S. Environmental Protection Agency (EPA) and the California Air Resources Board (CARB) included the impact of indirect land use changes (ILUC) as part of the lifecycle analysis of crop-based biofuels. Brazilian sugarcane ethanol meets both the ruled California Low-Carbon Fuel Standard (LCFS) and the proposed federal Renewable Fuel Standard (RFS2), despite the additional carbon emissions associated with ILUC. On February 3, 2010, EPA issued its final ruling regarding the RFS2 for 2010 and beyond, and determined that Brazilian ethanol produced from sugarcane complies with the applicable 50% GHG reduction threshold for the advanced fuel category. EPA's modelling shows that sugarcane ethanol from Brazil reduces greenhouse gas emissions as compared to gasoline by 61%, using a 30-year payback for indirect land use change (ILUC) emissions. By September 2010 five Brazilian sugarcane ethanol mills have been approved by the EPA to export their ethanol in the U.S. under the advanced biofuel category.

A report commissioned by the United Nations, based on a detailed review of published research up to mid-2009 as well as the input of independent experts worldwide, found that ethanol from sugar cane as produced in Brazil "in some circumstances does better than just 'zero emission.' If grown and processed correctly, it has negative emission, pulling CO_{2} out of the atmosphere, rather than adding it." In contrast, the report found that U.S. use of maize for biofuel is less efficient, as sugarcane can lead to emissions reductions of between 70% and well over 100% when substituted for gasoline. A 2010 study commissioned by the European Commission found that emission reduction effects of first-generation biofuels are positive, even after discounting indirect land use change effects, particularly the "more emission-efficient" sugarcane ethanol from Brazil, which would have to be imported to assure the environmental viability of the EU's biofuels mandate.

Another 2010 study published by the World Bank found that "Brazil's transport sector has a lower carbon intensity compared to that of most other countries because of its widespread use of ethanol as a fuel for vehicles." The study also concluded that despite the already low emission intensity, urban transportation is responsible for 51% of CO_{2} emissions within the Brazilian transport sector in 2008, and mainly originate in the growing use of private cars, traffic congestion and inefficient public transportation systems. Nevertheless, the study concluded that the increased use of flexible-fuel vehicles and the switch from gasoline to sugarcane ethanol are expected to stabilize GHG emissions from the light vehicle fleet over the next 25 years despite an expected increase in the number of kilometers traveled. Furthermore, the study found that if bioethanol's market share of the gasoline-powered vehicle market reaches 80% in 2030, this switch from gasoline "could deliver more than one-third of total emissions reduction targeted for the transport sector over the period" (2008–2030). The study also concluded that by increasing Brazilian ethanol exports to attend the increasing international demand for low-carbon fuels, its trade partners will benefit from reduced CHG emissions. However, for this opportunity to be realized, trade barriers and subsidies in many countries will have to be reduced or eliminated.

A 2009 study published in Energy Policy found that the use of ethanol fuel in Brazil has allowed to avoid over 600 million tons of CO_{2} emissions since 1975, when the Pró-Álcool Program began. The study also concluded that the neutralization of the carbon released due to land-use change was achieved in 1992. In another estimate, UNICA, the main Brazilian ethanol industry organization, estimated that just the use of ethanol fuel in flex-fuel vehicles in Brazil has avoided 83.5 million tons of CO_{2} emissions between March 2003 and January 2010.

===== Air pollution =====
The widespread use of ethanol brought several environmental benefits to urban centers regarding air pollution. Lead additives to gasoline were reduced through the 1980s as the amount of ethanol blended in the fuel was increased, and these additives were eliminated by 1991. The addition of ethanol blends instead of lead to gasoline lowered the total carbon monoxide (CO), hydrocarbons, sulfur emissions, and particulate matter significantly. The use of ethanol-only vehicles has also reduced CO emissions drastically. Before the Pró-Álcool Program started, when gasoline was the only fuel in use, CO emissions were higher than 50 g/km driven; they had been reduced to less than 5.8 g/km in 1995. Several studies have also shown that São Paulo has benefit with significantly less air pollution thanks to ethanol's cleaner emissions. Furthermore, Brazilian flex-fuel engines are being designed with higher compression ratios, taking advantage of the higher ethanol blends and maximizing the benefits of the higher oxygen content of ethanol, resulting in lower emissions and improving fuel efficiency.

Even though all automotive fossil fuels emit aldehydes, one of the drawbacks of the use of hydrated ethanol in ethanol-only engines is the increase in aldehyde emissions as compared with gasoline or gasohol. However, the present ambient concentrations of aldehyde, in São Paulo city are below the reference levels recommended as adequate to human health found in the literature. Other concern is that because formaldehyde and acetaldehyde emissions are significantly higher, and although both aldehydes occur naturally and are frequently found in the open environment, additional emissions may be important because of their role in smog formation. However, more research is required to establish the extent and direct consequences, if any, on health.

==== Issues ====
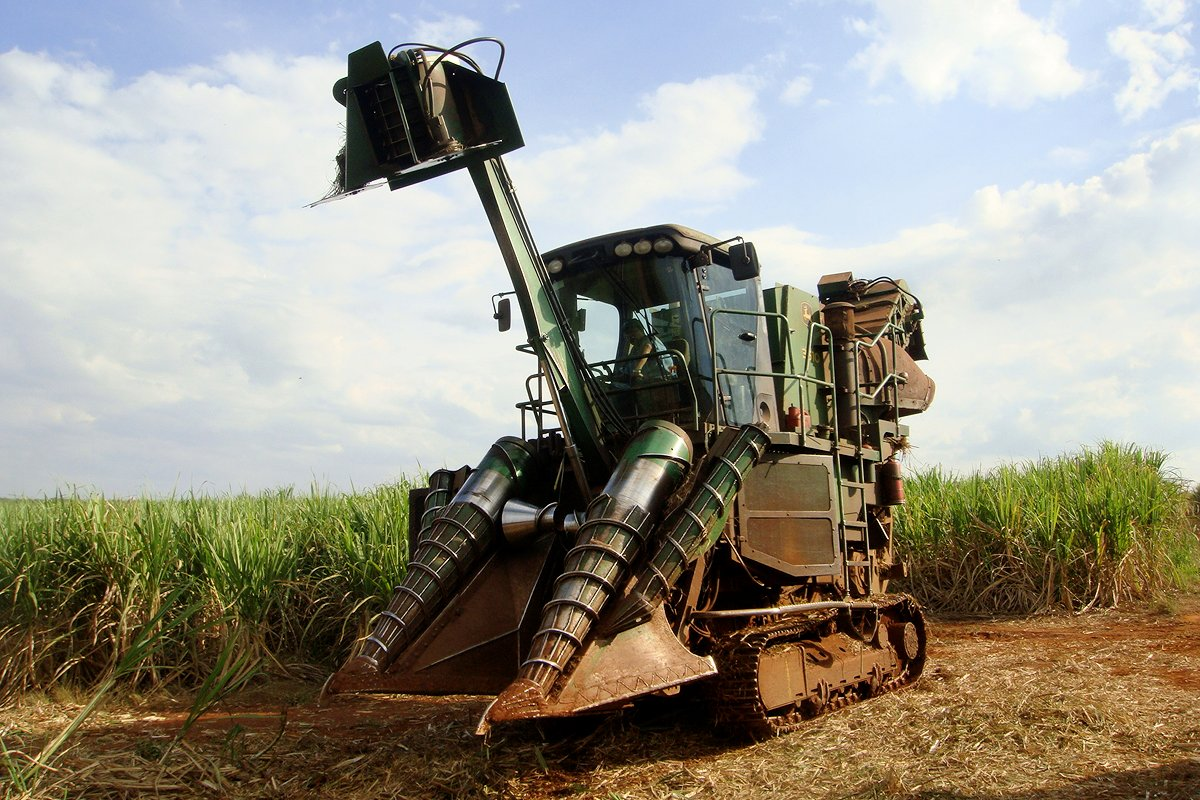
Typical sugarcane harvester, São Paulo state

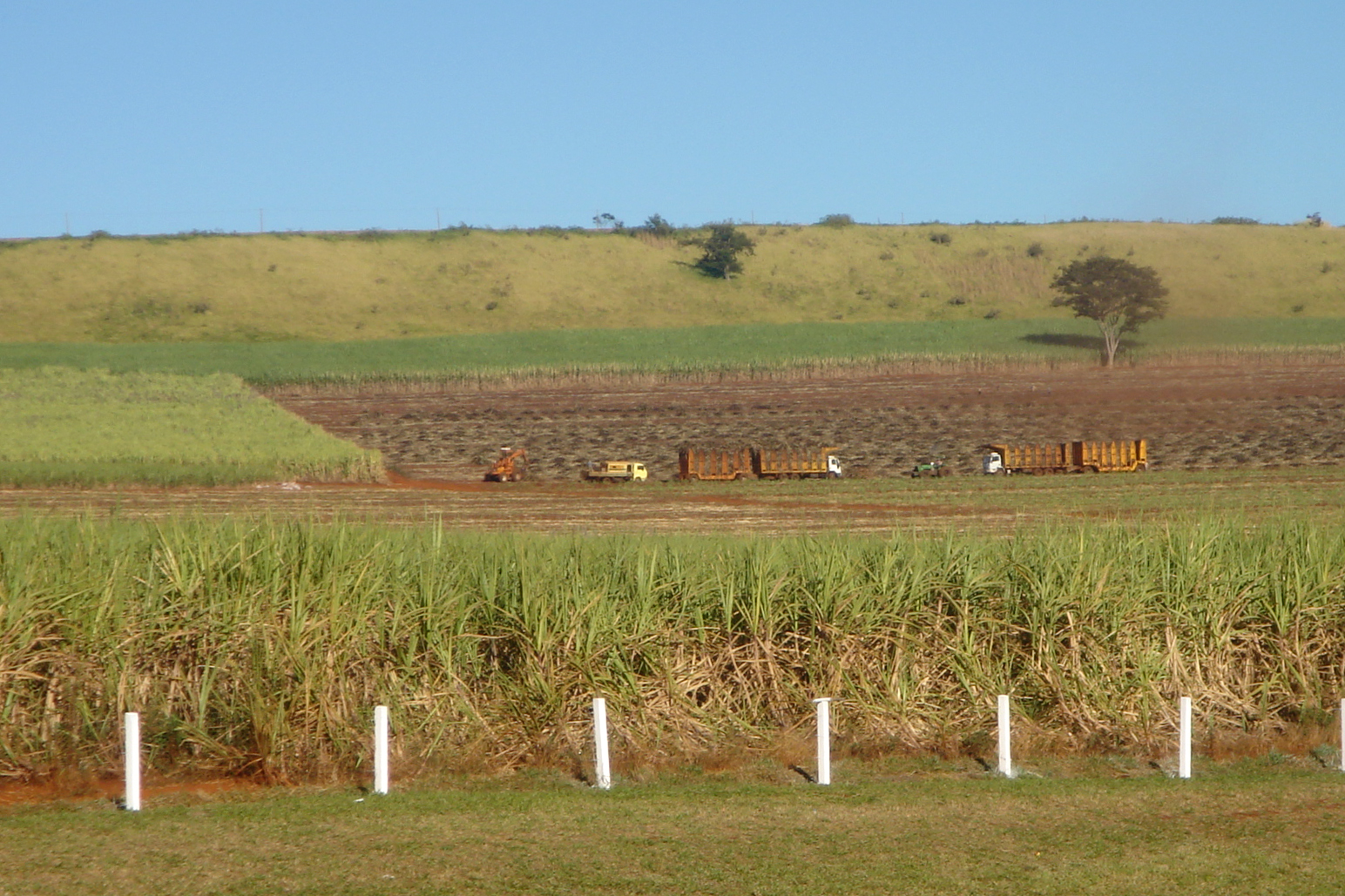
Sugar cane harvest loading operation for transport to the sugar/ethanol processing plant, without previous burning of the plantation, São Paulo state

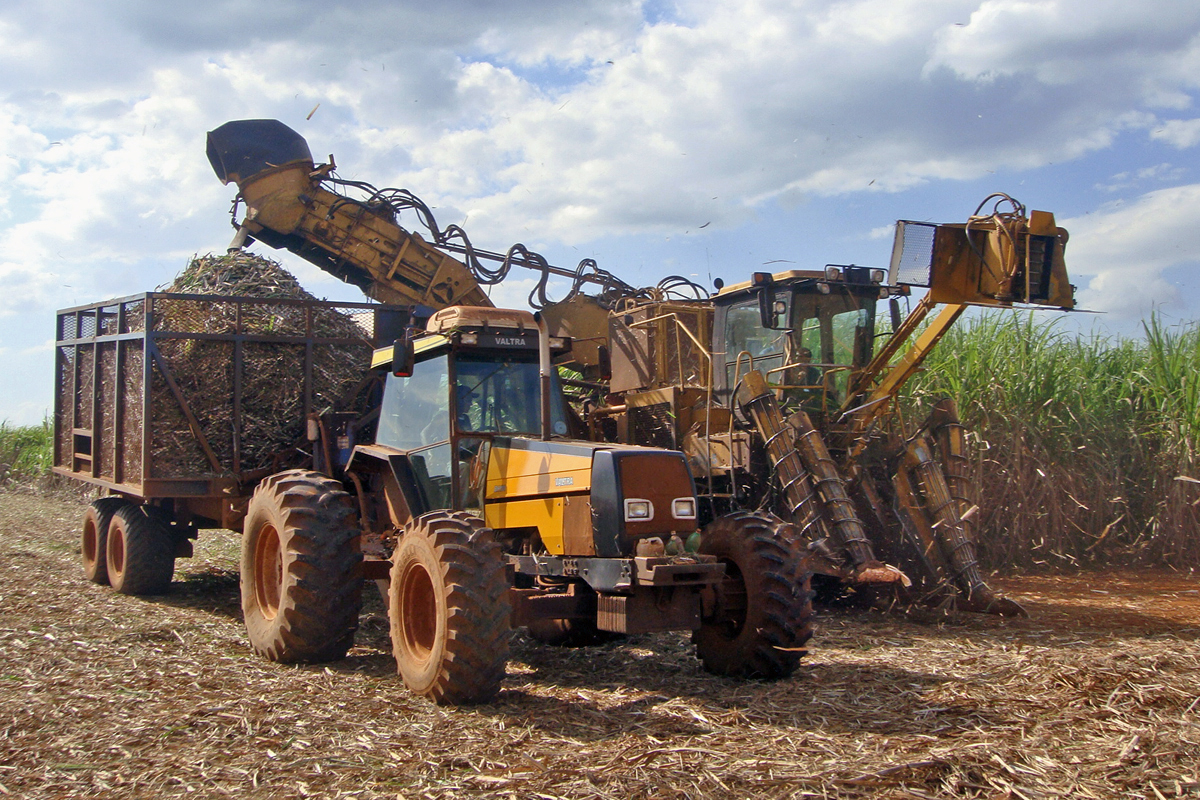
Mechanized sugarcane harvesting operation. Use of harvesting machines avoids the need for burning the plantation, São Paulo state.

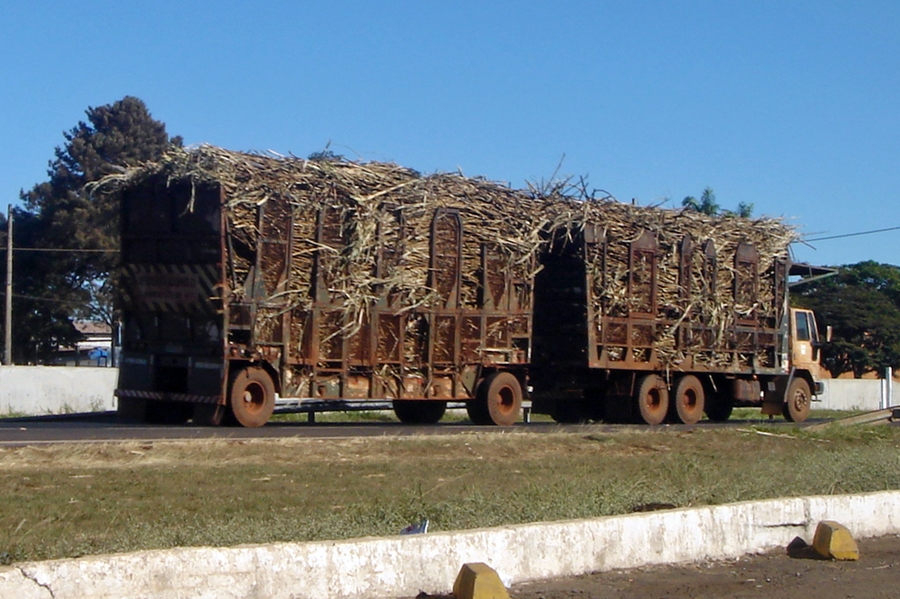
Typical vehicle used for harvest transport to the sugar/ethanol processing plant at São Paulo state

===== Water use and fertilizers =====
Ethanol production has also raised concerns regarding water overuse and pollution, soil erosion and possible contamination by excessive use of fertilizers. A study commissioned by the Dutch government in 2006 to evaluate the sustainability of Brazilian bioethanol concluded that there is sufficient water to supply all foreseeable long-term water requirements for sugarcane and ethanol production. Also, and as a result of legislation and technological progress, the amount of water collected for ethanol production has decreased considerably during the previous years. The overuse of water resources seems a limited problem in general in São Paulo, particularly because of the relatively high rainfall, yet, some local problems may occur. Regarding water pollution due to sugarcane production, Embrapa classifies the industry as level 1, which means "no impact" on water quality.

This evaluation also found that consumption of agrochemicals for sugar cane production is lower than in citric, corn, coffee and soybean cropping. Disease and pest control, including the use of agrochemicals, is a crucial element in all cane production. The study found that development of resistant sugar cane varieties is a crucial aspect of disease and pest control and is one of the primary objectives of Brazil's cane genetic improvement programs. Disease control is one of the main reasons for the replacement of a commercial variety of sugar cane.

===== Field burning =====
Advancements in fertilizers and natural pesticides have all but eliminated the need to burn fields. Sugarcane fields are traditionally burned just before harvest to avoid harm to the workers, by removing the sharp leaves and killing snakes and other harmful animals, and also to fertilize the fields with ash. There has been less burning due to pressure from the public and health authorities, and as a result of the recent development of effective harvesting machines. In the mid 1990s, it was very common to experience quite dense ash rains in cities within the sugarcane's fields during harvest seasons. A 2001 state law banned burning in sugarcane fields in São Paulo state by 2021, and machines will gradually replace human labor as the means of harvesting cane, except where the abrupt terrain does not allow for mechanical harvesting. However, 150 out of 170 of São Paulo's sugar cane processing plants signed in 2007 a voluntary agreement with the state government to comply by 2014. Independent growers signed in 2008 the voluntary agreement to comply, and the deadline was extended to 2017 for sugar cane fields located in more abrupt terrain. By the 2009/10 harvest season more than 50% of the cane was collected in São Paulo with harvesting machines. Mechanization will reduce pollution from burning fields and has higher productivity than people, but also will create unemployment for these seasonal workers, many of them coming from the poorest regions of Brazil. Due to mechanization the number of temporary workers in the sugarcane plantations has already declined as each harvester machine replaces about 100 cane cutters a day and creates 30 jobs including operators and maintenance teams.

===== Effects of land use change =====
Two studies published in 2008 questioned the benefits estimated in previous assessments regarding the reduction of greenhouse gas emissions from sugarcane-based ethanol, as the authors consider that previous studies did not take into account the direct and indirect effect of land use changes. The authors found a "biofuel carbon debt" is created when Brazil and other developing countries convert land in undisturbed ecosystems, such as rainforests, savannas, or grasslands, to biofuel production, and to crop production when agricultural land is diverted to biofuel production. This land use change releases more CO_{2} than the annual greenhouse gas (GHG) reductions that these biofuels would provide by displacing fossil fuels. Among others, the study analyzed the case of Brazilian Cerrado being converted for sugarcane ethanol production. The biofuel carbon debt on converted Cerrado is estimated to be repaid in 17 years, the least amount of time of the scenarios that were analyzed, as for example, ethanol from US corn was estimated to have a 93-year payback time. The study conclusion is that the net effect of biofuel production via clearing of carbon-rich habitats is to increase CO_{2} emissions for decades or centuries relative to fossil fuel use.

Regarding this concern, previous studies conducted in Brazil have shown there are 355 million ha of arable land in Brazil, of which only 72 million ha are in use. Sugarcane is only taking 2% of arable land available, of which ethanol production represented 55% in 2008. Embrapa estimates that there is enough agricultural land available to increase at least 30 times the existing sugarcane plantation without endangering sensitive ecosystems or taking land destined for food crops. Most future growth is expected to take place on abandoned pasture lands, as it has been the historical trend in São Paulo state. Also, productivity is expected to improve even further based on current biotechnology research, genetic improvement, and better agronomic practices, thus contributing to reduce land demand for future sugarcane cultures. This trend is demonstrated by the increases in agricultural production that took place in São Paulo state between 1990 and 2004, where coffee, orange, sugarcane and other food crops were grown in an almost constant area.

Also regarding the potential negative impacts of land use changes on carbon emissions, a study commissioned by the Dutch government concluded that "it is very difficult to determine the indirect effects of further land use for sugar cane production (i.e. sugar cane replacing another crop like soy or citrus crops, which in turn causes additional soy plantations replacing pastures, which in turn may cause deforestation), and also not logical to attribute all these soil carbon losses to sugar cane." Other authors have also questioned these indirect effects, as cattle pastures are displaced to the cheaper land near the Amazon. Studies rebutting this concern claim that land devoted to free grazing cattle is shrinking, as density of cattle on pasture land increased from 1.28 heads of cattle/ha to 1.41 from 2001 to 2005, and further improvements are expected in cattle feeding practices.

A paper published in February 2010 by a team led by Lapola from the University of Kassel found that the planned expansion of biofuel plantations (sugarcane and soybean) in Brazil up to 2020 will have a small direct land-use impact on carbon emissions, but indirect land-use changes could offset the carbon savings from biofuels due to the expansion of the rangeland frontier into the Amazonian forests, particularly due to displacement of cattle ranching. "Sugarcane ethanol and soybean biodiesel each contribute to nearly half of the projected indirect deforestation of 121,970 km^{2} by 2020, creating a carbon debt that would take about 250 years to be repaid using these biofuels instead of fossil fuels." The analysis also showed that intensification of cattle ranching, combined with efforts to promote high-yielding oil crops are required to achieve effective carbon savings from biofuels in Brazil, "while still fulfilling all food and bioenergy demands".

The main Brazilian ethanol industry organization (UNICA) commented that this study and other calculations of land-use impacts are missing a key factor, the fact that in Brazil "cattle production and pasture has been intensifying already and is projected to do so in the future".

===== Deforestation =====
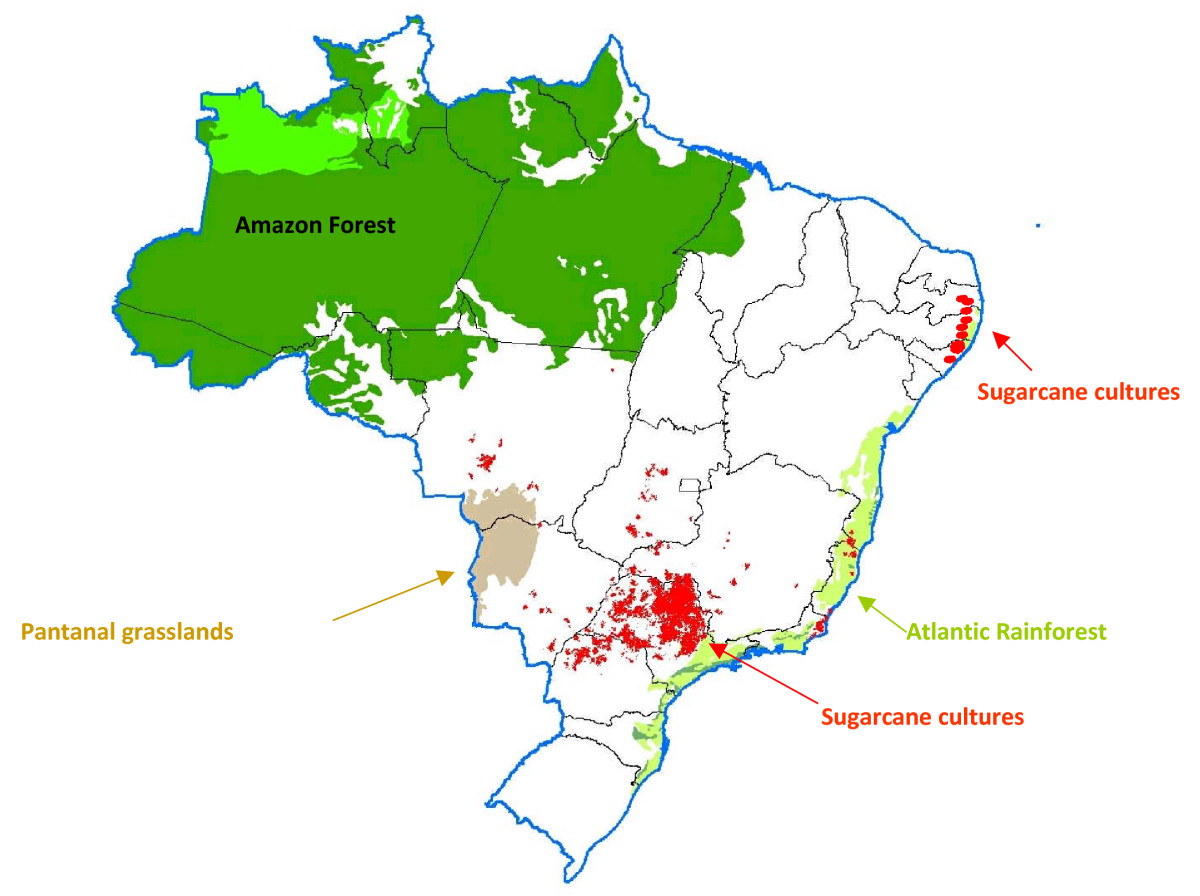
Location of environmentally valuable areas with respect to sugarcane plantations. São Paulo, located in the Southeast Region of Brazil, concentrates two-thirds of sugarcane cultures.

Other criticism have focused on the potential for clearing rain forests and other environmentally valuable land for sugarcane production, such as the Amazon, the Pantanal or the Cerrado. Embrapa and UNICA have rebutted this concern explaining that 99.7% of sugarcane plantations are located at least 2,000 kilometres (1,200 mi) from the Amazonia, and expansion during the last 25 years took place in the Center-South region, also far away from the Amazonia, the Pantanal or the Atlantic forest. In São Paulo state growth took place in abandoned pasture lands.

The impact assessment regarding future changes in land use, forest protection and risks on biodiversity conducted as part of the study commissioned by the Dutch government concluded that "the direct impact of cane production on biodiversity is limited, because cane production replaces mainly pastures and/or food crop and sugar cane production takes place far from the major biomes in Brazil (Amazon Rain Forest, Cerrado, Atlantic Forest, Caatinga, Campos Sulinos and Pantanal)." However, "the indirect impacts from an increase of the area under sugar cane production are likely more severe. The most important indirect impact would be an expansion of the area agricultural land at the expense of cerrados. The cerrados are an important biodiversity reserve. These indirect impacts are difficult to quantify and there is a lack of practically applicable criteria and indicators."

In order to guarantee a sustainable development of ethanol production, in September 2009 the government issued by decree a countrywide agroecological land use zoning to restrict sugarcane growth in or near environmentally sensitive areas such as the Pantanal wetlands, the Amazon rainforest and the Upper Paraguay River Basin. The installation of new ethanol production plants will not be permitted on these locations, and only existing plants and new ones with environmental licensed already approved before September 17, 2009, will be allowed to remain operating in these sensitive areas. According to the new criteria, 92.5% of the Brazilian territory is not suitable for sugarcane plantation. The government considers that the suitable areas are more than enough to meet the future demand for ethanol and sugar in the domestic and international markets foreseen for the next decades.

=== Social implications ===
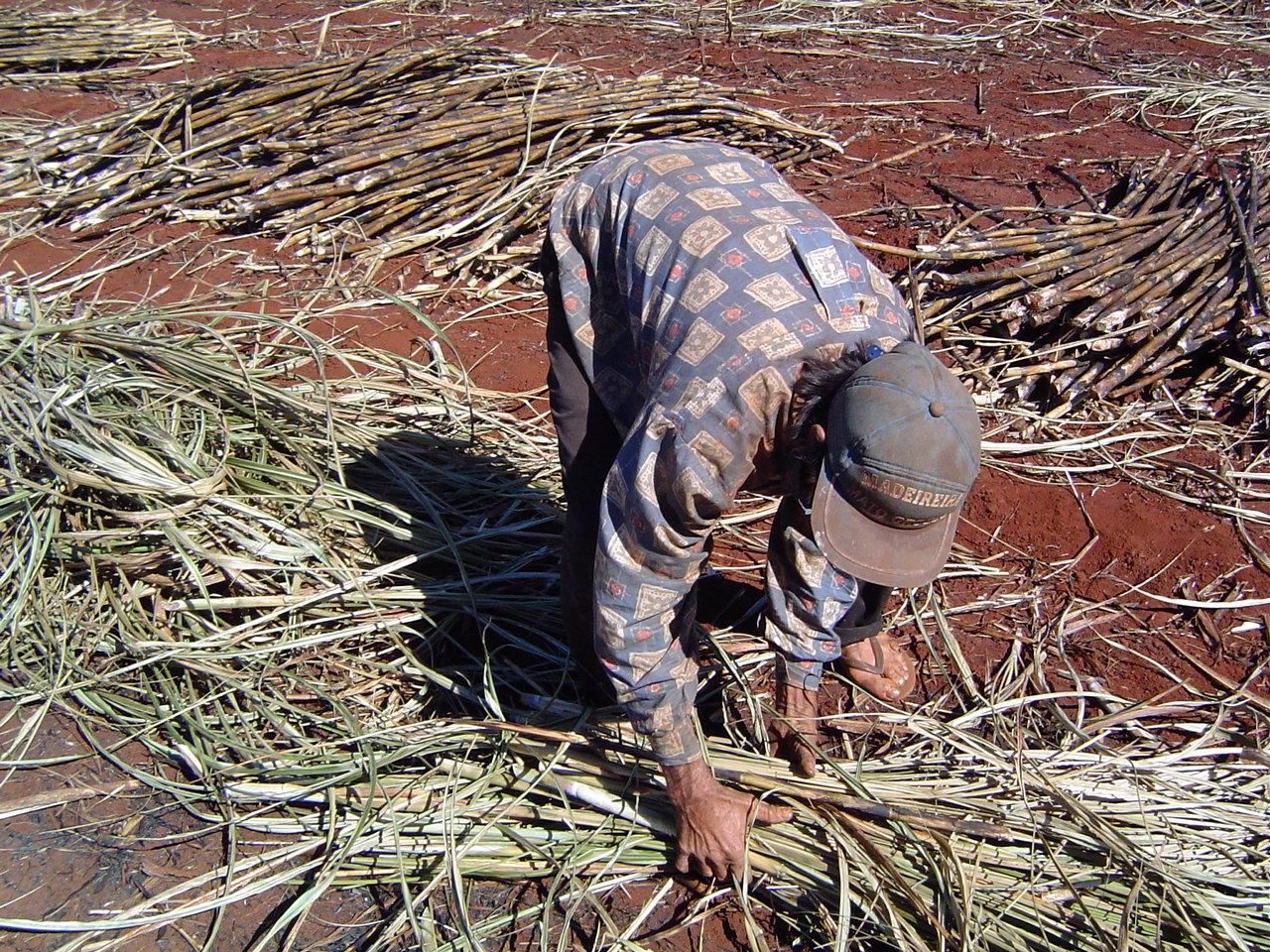
Typical sugarcane worker during the harvest season, São Paulo state

Sugarcane has had an important social contribution to some of the poorest people in Brazil by providing income usually above the minimum wage, and a formal job with fringe benefits. Formal employment in Brazil accounts an average 45% across all sectors, while the sugarcane sector has a share of 72.9% formal jobs in 2007, up from 53.6% in 1992, and in the more developed sugarcane ethanol industry in São Paulo state formal employment reached 93.8% in 2005. Average wages in sugar cane and ethanol production are above the official minimum wage, but minimum wages may be insufficient to avoid poverty. The North-Northeast regions stands out for having much lower levels of education among workers and lower monthly income. The average number workers with 3 or less school years in Brazil is 58.8%, while in the Southeast this percentage is 46.2%, in the Northeast region is 76,4%. Therefore, earnings in the Center-South are not surprisingly higher than those in the North-Northeast for comparable levels of education. In 2005 sugarcane harvesting workers in the Center-South region received an average wage 58.7% higher than the average wage in the North-Northeast region. The main social problems are related to cane cutters which do most of the low-paid work related to ethanol production.

The total number of permanent employees in the sector fell by one-third between 1992 and 2003, in part due to the increasing reliance on mechanical harvesting, especially from the richer and more mature sugarcane producers of São Paulo state. During the same period, the share of temporary or seasonal workers has fluctuated, first declining and then increasing in recent years to about one-half of the total jobs in the sector, but in absolute terms the number of temporary workers has declined also. The sugarcane sector in the poorer Northeast region is more labor-intensive as production in this region represents only 18.6% of the country's total production but employs 44.3% of worker force in the sugarcane sector.

The manual harvesting of sugarcane has been associated with hardship and poor working conditions. In this regard, the study commissioned by the Dutch government confirmed that the main problem is indeed related to manual cane harvesting. A key problem in working conditions is the high work load. As a result of mechanization the workload per worker has increased from 4 to 6 ton per day in the eighties to 8 to 10 ton per day in the nineties, up to 12 to 15 ton per day in 2007. If the quota is not fulfilled, workers can be fired. Producers say this problem will disappear with greater mechanization in the next decade. Also, as mechanization of the harvesting is increasing and only feasible in flat terrain, more workers are being used in areas where conditions are not suitable for mechanized harvesting equipment, such as rough areas where the crops are planted irregularly, making working conditions harder and more hazardous.

Also unhealthy working conditions and even cases of slavery and deaths from overwork (cane cutting) have been reported, but these are likely worst-case examples. Even though sufficiently strict labor laws are present in Brazil, enforcement is weak. Displacement and seasonal labor also implies physical and cultural disruption of multifunctional family farms and traditional communities.

Regarding social responsibility the ethanol production sector maintains more than 600 schools, 200 nursery centers and 300 day care units, as legislation requires that 1% of the net sugar cane price and 2% of the net ethanol price must be devoted to medical, dental, pharmaceutical, sanitary, and educational services for sugar cane workers. In practice more than 90% of the mills provide health and dental care, transportation and collective life insurance, and over 80% provide meals and pharmaceutical care. However, for the temporary low wage workers in cane cutting these services may not be available.

=== Effect on food prices ===
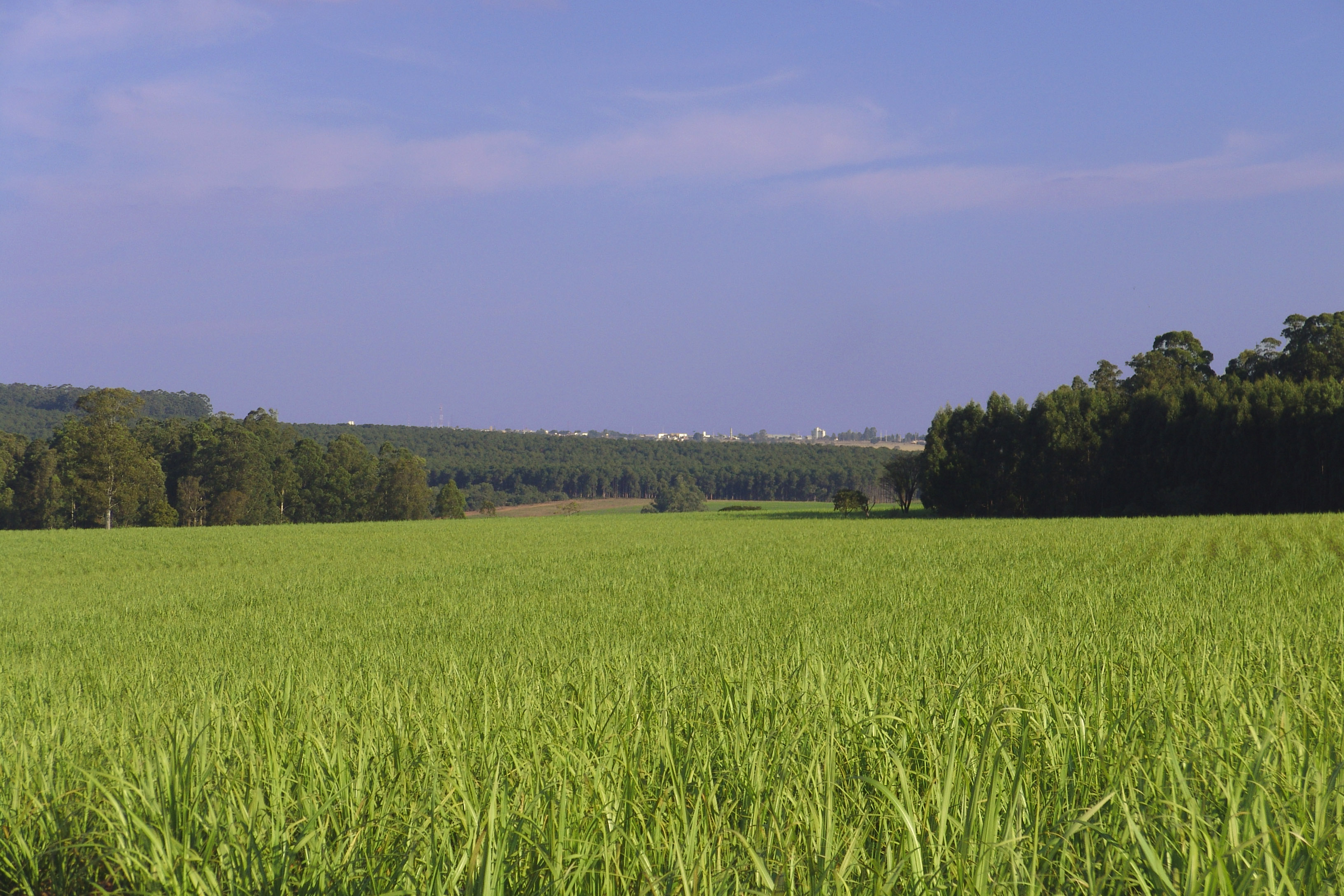
Santa Sofia sugarcane field for ethanol production in Avaré.

Some environmentalists, such as George Monbiot, have expressed fears that the marketplace will convert crops to fuel for the rich, while the poor starve and biofuels cause environmental problems. Environmental groups have raised concerns about this trade-off for several years. The food vs fuel debate reached a global scale in 2008 as a result of the international community's concerns regarding the steep increase in food prices. In April 2008, Jean Ziegler, back then United Nations Special Rapporteur on the Right to Food, called biofuels a "crime against humanity", a claim he had previously made in October 2007, when he called for a 5-year ban for the conversion of land for the production of biofuels. Also in April 2008, the World Bank's President, Robert Zoellick, stated that "While many worry about filling their gas tanks, many others around the world are struggling to fill their stomachs. And it's getting more and more difficult every day."

Luiz Inácio Lula da Silva gave a strong rebuttal, calling these claims "fallacies resulting from commercial interests", and putting the blame instead on U.S. and European agricultural subsidies, and a problem restricted to U.S. ethanol produced from maize. The Brazilian President has also claimed on several occasions that his country's sugar cane–based ethanol industry has not contributed to the food price crises.

A report released by Oxfam in June 2008 criticized biofuel policies of rich countries as neither a solution to the climate crisis nor the oil crisis, while contributing to the food price crisis. The report concluded that from all biofuels available in the market, Brazilian sugarcane ethanol is "far from perfect" but it is the most favorable biofuel in the world in term of cost and greenhouse gas balance. The report discusses some existing problems and potential risks, and asks the Brazilian government for caution to avoid jeopardizing its environmental and social sustainability. The report also says that: "Rich countries spent up to $15 billion last year supporting biofuels while blocking cheaper Brazilian ethanol, which is far less damaging for global food security."

A World Bank research report published in July 2008 found that from June 2002 to June 2008 "biofuels and the related consequences of low grain stocks, large land use shifts, speculative activity and export bans" accounted for 70–75% of total price rises. The study found that higher oil prices and a weak dollar explain 25–30% of total price rise. The study said that "large increases in biofuels production in the United States and Europe are the main reason behind the steep rise in global food prices" and also stated that "Brazil's sugar-based ethanol did not push food prices appreciably higher." The report argues that increased production of biofuels in these developed regions were supported by subsidies and tariffs on imports, and considers that without such policies, price increases worldwide would have been smaller. This research paper also concluded that Brazil's sugar cane–based ethanol has not raised sugar prices significantly, and recommends removing tariffs on ethanol imports by both the U.S. and EU, to allow more efficient producers such as Brazil and other developing countries, including many African countries, to produce ethanol profitably for export to meet the mandates in the EU and U.S.

An economic assessment report also published in July 2008 by the OECD agrees with the World Bank report regarding the negative effects of subsidies and trade restrictions, but found that the impact of biofuels on food prices are much smaller. The OECD study is also critical of the limited reduction of GHG emissions achieved from biofuels produced in Europe and North America, concluding that the current biofuel support policies would reduce greenhouse gas emissions from transport fuel by no more than 0.8% by 2015, while Brazilian ethanol from sugar cane reduces greenhouse gas emissions by at least 80% compared to fossil fuels. The assessment calls on governments for more open markets in biofuels and feedstocks in order to improve efficiency and lower costs.

A study by the Brazilian research unit of the Fundação Getúlio Vargas regarding the effects of biofuels on grain prices. concluded that the major driver behind the 2007–2008 rise in food prices was speculative activity on futures markets under conditions of increased demand in a market with low grain stocks. The study also concluded that expansion of biofuel production was not a relevant factor and also that there is no correlation between Brazilian sugarcane cultivated area and average grain prices, as on the contrary, the spread of sugarcane was accompanied by rapid growth of grain crops in the country.

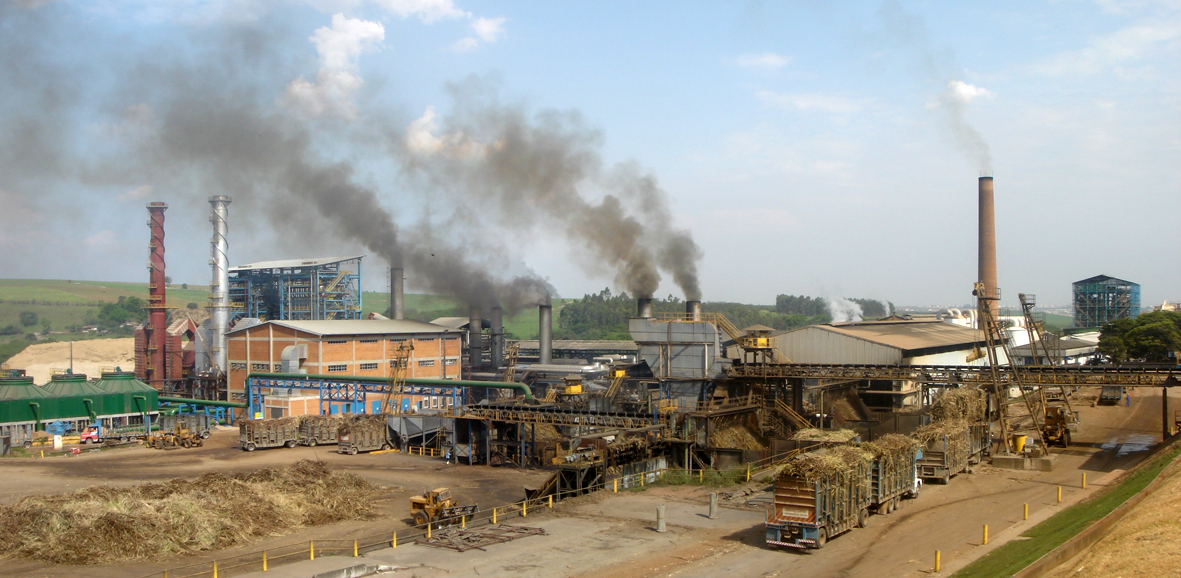
Panoramic view of the Costa Pinto Production Plant located in Piracicaba, São Paulo state. This industrial plant is set up to produce sugar, ethanol fuel (both anhydrous and hydrous), industrial grade ethanol, and alcohol for beverages. The foreground shows the receiving operation of the sugarcane harvest, immediately followed by the mill process, and in the right side of the background is located the distillation facility where ethanol is produced. This plant produces the electricity it needs from baggasse residuals from sugar cane left over by the milling process, and it sells the surplus electricity to public utilities.

== See also ==
- First-generation biofuel
- Renewable energy in Brazil
- Common ethanol fuel mixtures
- Biofuels by region
- List of renewable energy topics by country
- Ethanol fuel by country
- Ethanol fuel in Australia
- Ethanol fuel in the Philippines
- Ethanol fuel in Sweden
- Ethanol fuel in the United States
- Flexible-fuel vehicle
- Low-carbon fuel standard

== Bibliography ==
- Macedo, Isaias de Carvalho, ed. (2007). A Energia da Cana-de-Açúcar – Doze estudos sobre a agroindústria da cana-de-açúcar no Brasil e a sua sustentabilidade (Available in PDF) (in Portuguese) (Second ed.). Berlendis & Vertecchia, São Paulo: UNICA – União da Agroindústria Canavieira do Estado de São Paulo. CDD-338.173610981.
- Neves, Marcos Fava; Mairun Junqueira Alves Pinto; Marco Antonio Conejero; Vinicius Gustavo Trombin (2011). Food and fuel: The example of Brazil. Wageningen Academic Publishers, The Netherlands. ISBN 978-90-8686-166-8.
- Rothkopf, Garten (2007). A Blueprint for Green Energy in the Americas. Inter-American Development Bank, Washington, D.C. Archived from the original (Available in PDF) on January 3, 2009.
- Mitchell, Donald (2010). Biofuels in Africa: Opportunities, Prospects, and Challenges. The World Bank, Washington, D.C. ISBN 978-0-8213-8516-6. Archived from the original (Available in PDF) on August 11, 2011. See Appendix A: The Brazilian Experience
