= Indirect land use change impacts of biofuels =

Negative spillover effect of production of biofuels

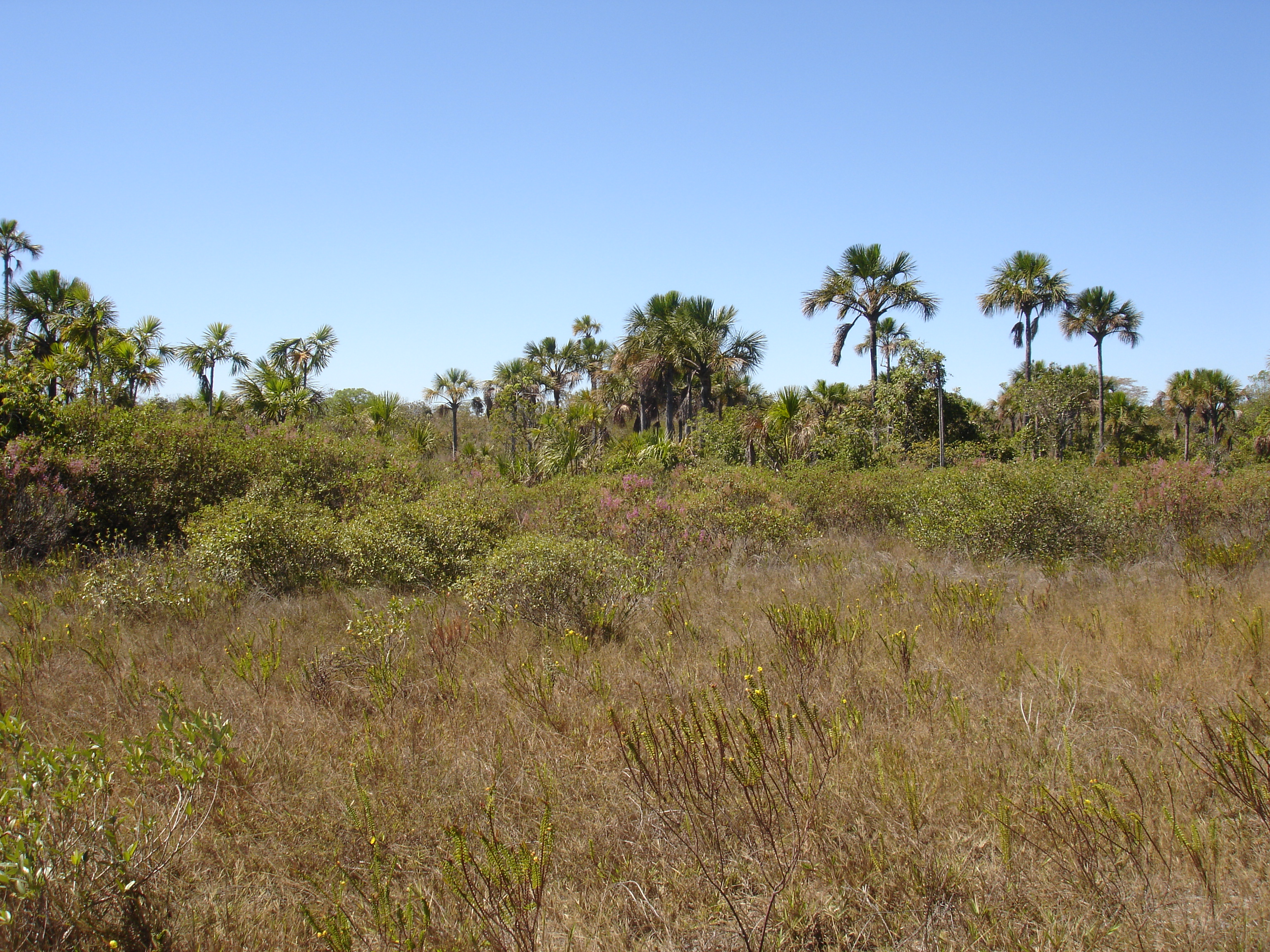
Brazilian cerrado

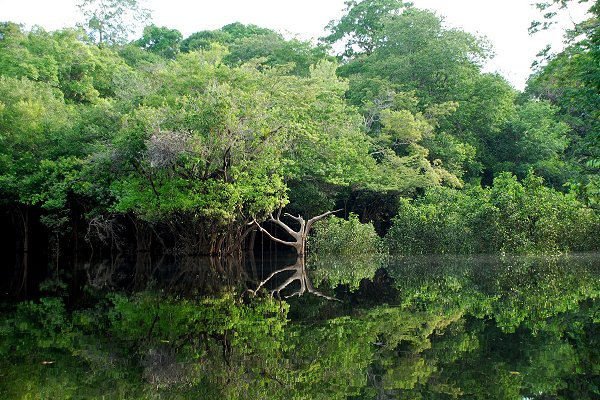
Amazon rainforest

The indirect land use change impacts of biofuels, also known as ILUC or iLUC (pronounced as i-luck), relates to the unintended consequence of releasing more carbon emissions due to land-use changes around the world induced by the expansion of croplands for ethanol or biodiesel production in response to the increased global demand for biofuels.

As farmers worldwide respond to higher crop prices in order to maintain the global food supply-and-demand balance, pristine lands are cleared to replace the food crops that were diverted elsewhere to biofuels' production. Because natural lands, such as rainforests and grasslands, store carbon in their soil and biomass as plants grow each year, clearance of wilderness for new farms translates to a net increase in greenhouse gas emissions. Due to this off-site change in the carbon stock of the soil and the biomass, indirect land use change has consequences in the greenhouse gas (GHG) balance of a biofuel.

Other authors have also argued that indirect land use changes produce other significant social and environmental impacts, affecting biodiversity, water quality, food prices and supply, land tenure, worker migration, and community and cultural stability.

== History ==
The estimates of carbon intensity for a given biofuel depend on the assumptions regarding several variables. As of 2008, multiple full life cycle studies had found that corn ethanol, cellulosic ethanol and Brazilian sugarcane ethanol produce lower greenhouse gas emissions than gasoline. None of these studies, however, considered the effects of indirect land-use changes, and though land use impacts were acknowledged, estimation was considered too complex and difficult to model. A controversial paper published in February 2008 in Sciencexpress by a team led by Searchinger from Princeton University concluded that such effects offset the (positive) direct effects of both corn and cellulosic ethanol and that Brazilian sugarcane performed better, but still resulted in a small carbon debt.

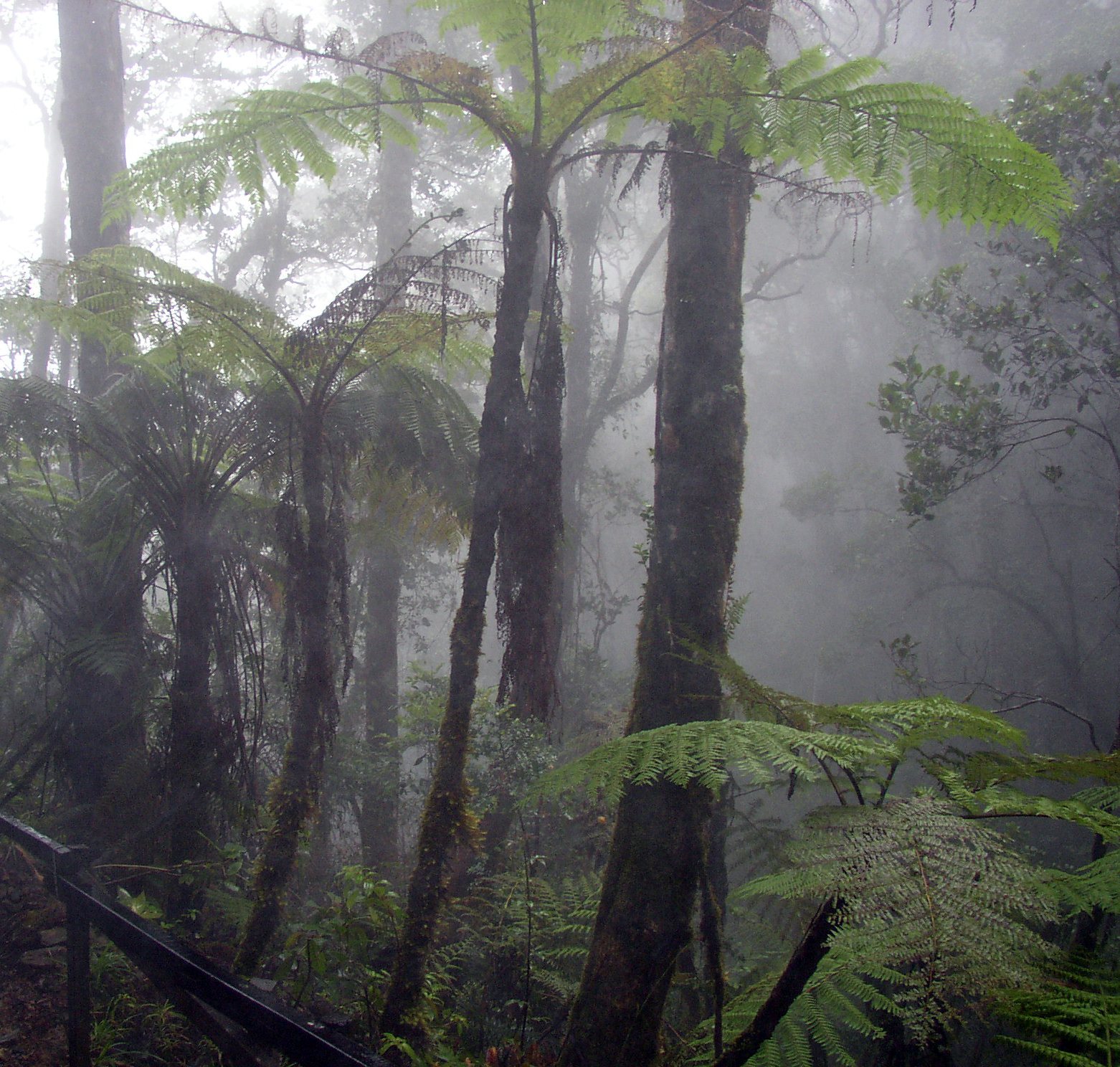
Malaysian cloud forest

After the Searchinger team paper, estimation of carbon emissions from ILUC, together with the food vs. fuel debate, became one of the most contentious issues relating to biofuels, debated in the popular media, scientific journals, op-eds and public letters from the scientific community, and the ethanol industry, both American and Brazilian. This controversy intensified in April 2009 when the California Air Resources Board (CARB) set rules that included ILUC impacts to establish the California Low-Carbon Fuel Standard that entered into force in 2011.

In May 2009 U.S. Environmental Protection Agency (EPA) released a notice of proposed rulemaking for implementation of the 2007 modification of the Renewable Fuel Standard (RFS). EPA's proposed regulations also included ILUC, causing additional controversy among ethanol producers. EPA's February 3, 2010 final rule incorporated ILUC based on modelling that was significantly improved over the initial estimates.

The UK Renewable Transport Fuel Obligation program requires the Renewable Fuels Agency (RFA) to report potential indirect impacts of biofuel production, including indirect land use change or changes to food and other commodity prices. A July 2008 RFA study, known as the Gallager Review, found several risks and uncertainties, and that the "quantification of GHG emissions from indirect land-use change requires subjective assumptions and contains considerable uncertainty", and required further examination to properly incorporate indirect effects into calculation methodologies. A similarly cautious approach was followed by the European Union. In December 2008 the European Parliament adopted more stringent sustainability criteria for biofuels and directed the European Commission to develop a methodology to factor in GHG emissions from indirect land use change.

== Studies and controversy ==
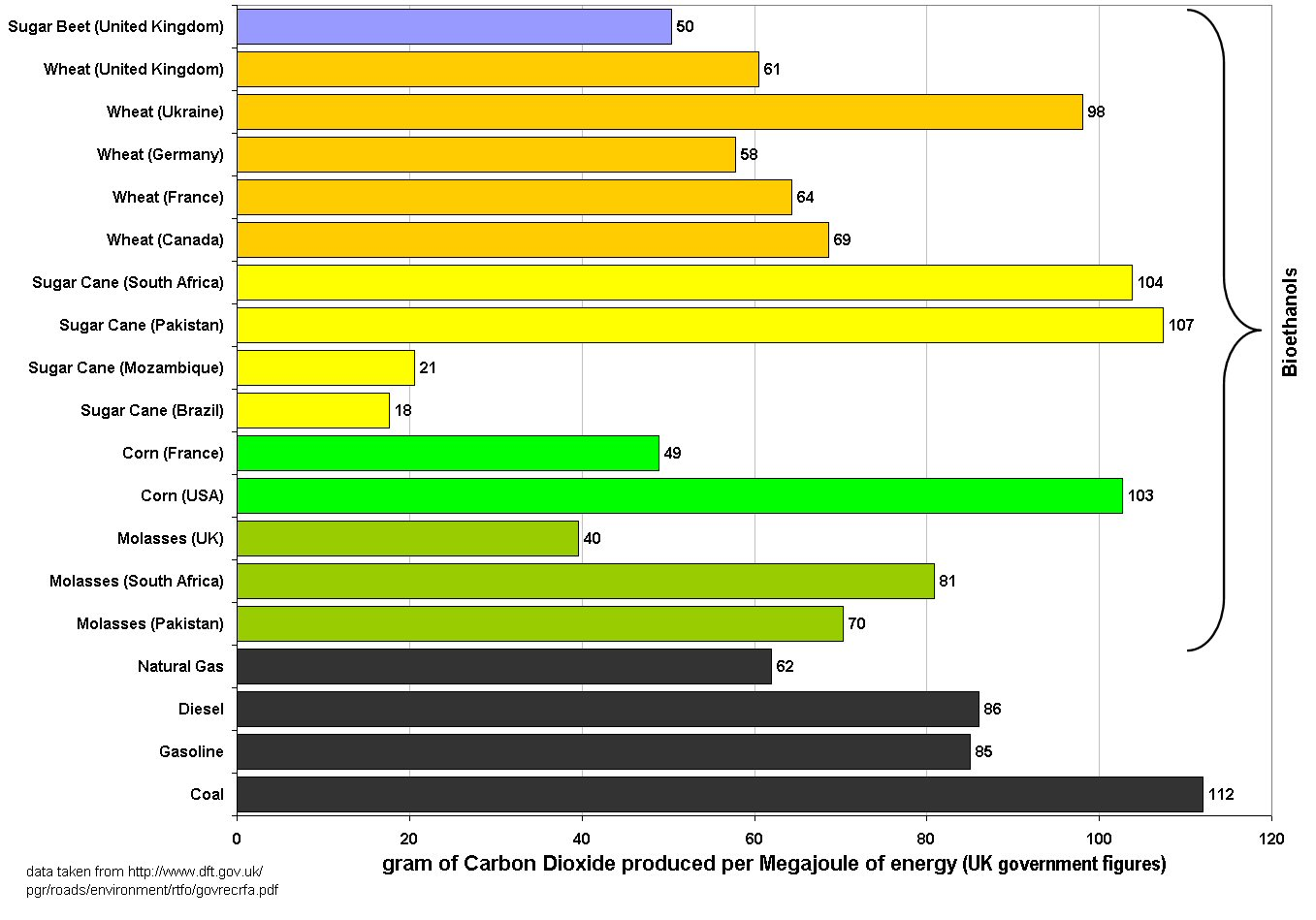
UK figures for the carbon intensity of bioethanol and fossil fuels. Graph assumes all bioethanols are burnt in country of origin and prior cropland was used to grow feedstock. No ILUC effects were included.

Before 2008, several full life cycle ("Well to Wheels" or WTW) studies had found that corn ethanol reduced transport-related greenhouse gas emissions. In 2007 a University of California, Berkeley team led by Farrel evaluated six previous studies, concluding that corn ethanol reduced GHG emissions by only 13 percent. However, 20 to 30 percent reduction for corn ethanol, and 85 to 85 percent for cellulosic ethanol, both figures estimated by Wang from Argonne National Laboratory, are more commonly cited. Wang reviewed 22 studies conducted between 1979 and 2005, and ran simulations with Argonne's GREET model. These studies accounted for direct land use changes. Several studies of Brazilian sugarcane ethanol showed that sugarcane as feedstock reduces GHG by 86 to 90 percent given no significant land use change. Estimates of carbon intensity depend on crop productivity, agricultural practices, power sources for ethanol distilleries and the energy efficiency of the distillery. None of these studies considered ILUC, due to estimation difficulties. Preliminary estimates by Delucchi from the University of California, Davis, suggested that carbon released by new lands converted to agricultural use was a large percentage of life-cycle emissions.

=== Searchinger and Fargione studies ===
In 2008 Timothy Searchinger, a lawyer from Environmental Defense Fund, concluded that ILUC affects the life cycle assessment and that instead of saving, both corn and cellulosic ethanol increased carbon emissions as compared to gasoline by 93 and 50 percent respectively. Ethanol from Brazilian sugarcane performed better, recovering initial carbon emissions in 4 years, while U.S. corn ethanol required 167 years and cellulosic ethanol required a 52 years payback period. The study limited the analysis a 30-year period, assuming that land conversion emits 25 percent of the carbon stored in soils and all carbon in plants cleared for cultivation. Brazil, China, and India were considered among the overseas locations where land use change would occur as a result of diverting U.S. corn cropland, and it was assumed that new cropland in each of these regions correspond to different types of forest, savanna or grassland based on the historical proportion of each converted to cultivation in these countries during the 1990s.

Summary of Searchinger et al. comparison of corn ethanol and gasoline GHG emissions with and without land use change (Grams of CO_{2} released per megajoule of energy in fuel)
Fuel type (U.S.)	Carbon intensity	Reduction; GHG	Carbon intensity + ILUC	Reduction; GHG
Gasoline	92	-	92	-
Corn ethanol	74	-20%	177	+93%
Cellulosic ethanol	28	-70%	138	+50%
Notes: Calculated using default assumptions for 2015 scenario for ethanol in E85. Gasoline is a combination of conventional and reformulated gasoline.

Fargione and his team published a separate paper in the same issue of Science claiming that clearing lands to produce biofuel feedstock created a carbon deficit. This deficit applies to both direct and indirect land use changes. The study examined six conversion scenarios: Brazilian Amazon to soybean biodiesel, Brazilian Cerrado to soybean biodiesel, Brazilian Cerrado to sugarcane ethanol, Indonesian or Malaysian lowland tropical rainforest to palm biodiesel, Indonesian or Malaysian peatland tropical rainforest to palm biodiesel, and U.S. Central grassland to corn ethanol. The carbon debt was defined as the amount of CO_{2} released during the first 50 years of this process of land conversion. For the two most common ethanol feedstocks, the study found that sugarcane ethanol produced on natural cerrado lands would take about 17 years to repay its carbon debt, while corn ethanol produced on U.S. central grasslands would result in a repayment time of about 93 years. The worst-case scenario is converting Indonesian or Malaysian tropical peatland rainforest to palm biodiesel production, which would require about 420 years to repay.

==== Criticism and controversy ====
The Searchinger and Fargione studies created controversy in both the popular media and in scientific journals. Robert Zubrin observed that Searchinger's "indirect analysis" approach is pseudo-scientific and can be used to "prove anything".

Wang and Haq from Argonne National Laboratory claimed: the assumptions were outdated; they ignored the potential of increased efficiency, and no evidence showed that "U.S. corn ethanol production has so far caused indirect land use in other countries." They concluded that Searchinger demonstrated that ILUC "is much more difficult to model than direct land use changes". In his response, Searchinger rebutted each technical objection and asserted that "... any calculation that ignores these emissions, however challenging it is to predict them with certainty, is too incomplete to provide a basis for policy decisions."

Another criticism, by Kline and Dale from Oak Ridge National Laboratory, held that Searchinger et al. and Fargione et al. "... do not provide adequate support for their claim that bioufuels cause high emissions due to land-use change", as their conclusions depends on a misleading assumption because more comprehensive field research found that these land use changes "... are driven by interactions among cultural, technological, biophysical, economic, and demographic forces within a spatial and temporal context rather than by a single crop market". Fargione et al. responded in part that although many factors contributed to land clearing, this "observation does not diminish the fact that biofuels also contribute to land clearing if they are produced on existing cropland or on newly cleared lands". Searchinger disagreed with all of Kline and Dale's arguments.

The U.S. biofuel industry also reacted, claiming that the "Searchinger study is clearly a 'worst case scenario' analysis ..." and that this study "relies on a long series of highly subjective assumptions ..." Searchinger rebutted each claim, concluding that NFA's criticisms were invalid. He noted that even if some of his assumptions are high estimates, the study also made many conservative assumptions.

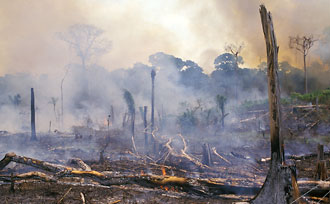
Slash and burn forest removal in Brazil

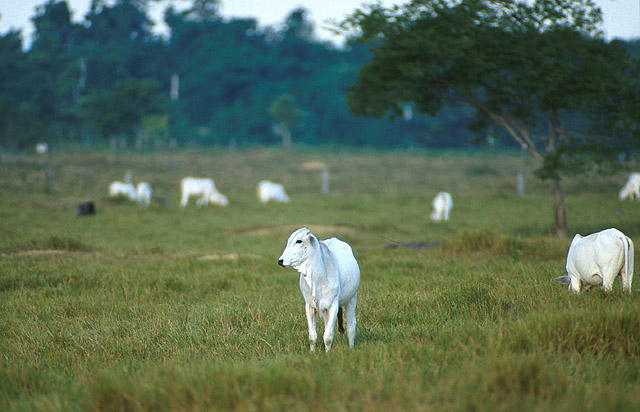
Cattle ranching in Brazil

=== Brazil ===
In February 2010, Lapola estimated that the planned expansion of Brazilian sugarcane and soybean biofuel plantations through 2020 would replace rangeland with a small direct land-use impact on carbon emissions. However, the expansion of the rangeland frontier into Amazonian forests, driven by cattle ranching, would indirectly offset the savings. "Sugarcane ethanol and soybean biodiesel each contributes to nearly half of the projected indirect deforestation of 121,970 km^{2} by 2020, creating a carbon debt that would take about 250 years to be repaid..."

The research also found that oil palm would cause the least land-use changes and associated carbon debt. The analysis also modeled livestock density increases and found that "a higher increase of 0.13 head per hectare in the average livestock density throughout the country could avoid the indirect land-use changes caused by biofuels (even with soybean as the biodiesel feedstock), while still fulfilling all food and bioenergy demands." The authors conclude that intensification of cattle ranching and concentration on oil palm are required to achieve effective carbon savings, recommending closer collaboration between the biofuel and cattle-ranching sectors.

The main Brazilian ethanol industry organization (UNICA) commented that such studies missed the continuing intensification of cattle production already underway.

A study by Arima et al. published in May 2011, used spatial regression modeling to provide the first statistical assessment of ILUC for the Brazilian Amazon due to soy production. Previously, the indirect impacts of soy crops were only anecdotal or analyzed through demand models at a global scale, while the study took a regional approach. The analysis showed a strong signal linking the expansion of soybean fields in settled agricultural areas at the southern and eastern rims of the Amazon basin to pasture encroachments for cattle production on the forest frontier. The results demonstrate the need to include ILUC in measuring the carbon footprint of soy crops, whether produced for biofuels or other end-uses.

The Arima study is based on 761 municipalities located in the Legal Amazon of Brazil and found that between 2003 and 2008, soybean areas expanded by 39,100 km^{2} in the basin's agricultural areas, mainly in Mato Grosso. The model showed that a 10% (3,910 km^{2}) reduction of soy in old pasture areas would have led to a reduction in deforestation of up to 40% (26,039 km^{2}) in heavily forested municipalities of the Brazilian Amazon. The analysis showed that the displacement of cattle production due to agricultural expansion drives land use change in municipalities located hundreds of kilometers away. The Amazonian ILUC is not only measurable, but its impact is significant.

== Implementation ==
=== United States ===
==== California LCFS ====
California carbon intensity values for gasoline, diesel and fuels that substitute them (grams of CO_{2} equivalent released per MJ of energy produced)
Fuel type	Carbon intensity	Carbon intensity + land-use changes	Intensity change respect to 2011 LCFS
Midwest corn ethanol	75.10	105.10	+10%
California gasoline	95.86	95.86	+0.2%
CARB LCFS 2011 for gasoline	-	95.61	-
California diesel (ULSD)	94.71	94.71	+0.2%
CARB LCFS 2011 for diesel	-	94.47	-
California ethanol	50.70	80.70	-16%
Brazilian sugarcane ethanol	27.40	73.40	-23%
Biodiesel (B100) Midwest soybeans^{(1)}	26.93	68.93	-27%
Renewable diesel Midwest soybeans^{(1)}	28.80	68.93	-27%
Cellulosic ethanol (farmed trees)^{(1)}	2.40	20.40	-79%
Compressed natural gas (bio-methane)	11.26	11.26	-88%
Note: the complete lifecycle analysis for these fuels and others evaluated are available at CARB's website (see Lifecycle Analysis). (1) Preliminary values of fuels not included in the 2009 LCFS ruling and subject to refining.

On April 23, 2009, California Air Resources Board (CARB) approved the specific rules and carbon intensity reference values for the California Low-Carbon Fuel Standard (LCFS) that take effect January 1, 2011. CARB's rulemaking included ILUC. For some biofuels, CARB identified land use changes as a significant source of additional GHG emissions. It established one standard for gasoline and alternative fuels, and a second for diesel fuel and its replacements.

===== Controversy =====
The public consultation process before the ruling, and the ruling itself were controversial, yielding 229 comments. ILUC was one of the most contentious issues. On June 24, 2008, 27 scientists and researchers submitted a letter saying, "As researchers and scientists in the field of biomass to biofuel conversion, we are convinced that there simply is not enough hard empirical data to base any sound policy regulation in regards to the indirect impacts of renewable biofuels production. The field is relative new, especially when compared to the vast knowledge base present in fossil fuel production, and the limited analyses are driven by assumptions that sometimes lack robust empirical validation." The New Fuels Alliance, representing more than two-dozen biofuel companies, researchers and investors, questioned the Board intention to include indirect land use change effects into account, wrote "While it is likely true that zero is not the right number for the indirect effects of any product in the real world, enforcing indirect effects in a piecemeal way could have very serious consequences for the LCFS.... The argument that zero is not the right number does not justify enforcing a different wrong number, or penalizing one fuel for one category of indirect effects while giving another fuel pathway a free pass."

On the other hand, more than 170 scientists and economists urged that CARB "include indirect land use change in the lifecycle analyses of heat-trapping emissions from biofuels and other transportation fuels. This policy will encourage development of sustainable, low-carbon fuels that avoid conflict with food and minimize harmful environmental impacts.... There are uncertainties inherent in estimating the magnitude of indirect land use emissions from biofuels, but assigning a value of zero is clearly not supported by the science."

Industry representatives complained that the final rule overstated the environmental effects of corn ethanol and criticized the inclusion of ILUC as an unfair penalty to domestic corn ethanol because deforestation in the developing world was tied to U.S. ethanol production. The 2011 limit for LCFS means that Mid-west corn ethanol failed, unless current carbon intensity was reduced. Oil industry representatives complained that the standard left oil refiners with few options, such as Brazilian sugarcane ethanol, with its accompanying tariff. CARB officials and environmentalists counter that time and economic incentives will allow produces to adapt.

UNICA welcomed the ruling, while urging CARB to reflect Brazilian practices better, lowering their estimates of Brazilian emissions.

The only board member who voted against the ruling explained that he had a "hard time accepting the fact that we're going to ignore the comments of 125 scientists", referring to the letter submitted by a group of scientists questioning the ILUC penalty. "They said the model was not good enough ... to use at this time as a component part of such an historic new standard." CARB advanced the expected date for an expert working group to report on ILUC with refined estimates from January 2012 to January 2011.

In December 2009, the Renewable Fuels Association (RFA) and Growth Energy, two U.S. ethanol lobbying groups, filed a lawsuit challenging LCFS' constitutionality. The two organizations argued that LCFS violated both the Supremacy Clause and the Commerce Clause, jeopardizing the nationwide ethanol market.

==== EPA Renewable Fuel Standard ====
U.S. Environmental Protection Agency Draft life cycle GHG emissions reduction results for different time horizon and discount rate approaches (includes indirect land use change effects)
Fuel Pathway	100 years + 2% discount rate	30 years + 0% discount rate
Corn ethanol (natural gas dry mill)^{(1)}	-16%	+5%
Corn ethanol (Best case NG DM)^{(2)}	-39%	-18%
Corn ethanol (coal dry mill)	+13%	+34%
Corn ethanol (biomass dry mill)	-39%	-18%
Corn ethanol (biomass dry mill with combined heat and power)	-47%	-26%
Soybean-based biodiesel	-22%	+4%
Waste grease biodiesel	-80%	-80%
Sugarcane ethanol	-44%	-26%
Cellulosic ethanol from switchgrass	-128%	-124%
Cellulosic ethanol from corn stover	-115%	-116%
Notes: (1) Dry mill (DM) plants grind the entire kernel and generally produce only one primary co-product: distillers grains with solubles (DGS). (2) Best case plants produce wet distillers grains co-product.

The Energy Independence and Security Act of 2007 (EISA) established new renewable fuel categories and eligibility requirements, setting mandatory lifecycle emissions limits. EISA explicitly mandated EPA to include "direct emissions and significant indirect emissions such as significant emissions from land use changes."

EISA required a 20% reduction in lifecycle GHG emissions for any fuel produced at facilities that commenced construction after December 19, 2007, to be classified as a "renewable fuel"; a 50% reduction for fuels to be classified as "biomass-based diesel" or "advanced biofuel", and a 60% reduction to be classified as "cellulosic biofuel". EISA provided limited flexibility to adjust these thresholds downward by up to 10 percent, and EPA proposed this adjustment for the advanced biofuels category. Existing plants were grandfathered in.

On May 5, 2009, EPA released a notice of proposed rulemaking for implementation of the 2007 modification of the Renewable Fuel Standard, known as RFS2. The draft of the regulations was released for public comment during a 60-day period, a public hearing was held on June 9, 2009, and also a workshop was conducted on June 10–11, 2009.

EPA's draft analysis stated that ILUC could produce significant near-term GHG emissions due to land conversion but that biofuels can pay these back over subsequent years. EPA highlighted two scenarios, varying the time horizon and the discount rate for valuing emissions. The first assumed 30-year period uses a 0 percent discount rate (valuing emissions equally regardless of timing). The second scenario used 100 years and a 2% discount rate.

On the same day that EPA published its notice of proposed rulemaking, President Obama signed a Presidential Directive seeking to advance biofuels research and commercialization. The Directive established the Biofuels Interagency Working Group, to develop policy ideas for increasing investment in next-generation fuels and for reducing their environmental footprint.

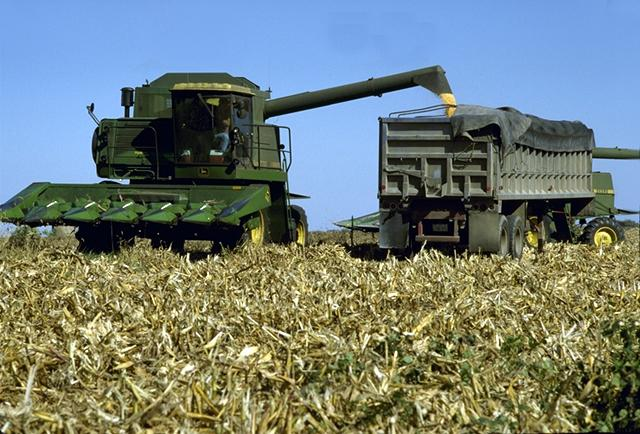
Maize is the main feedstock for the production of ethanol fuel in the U.S.

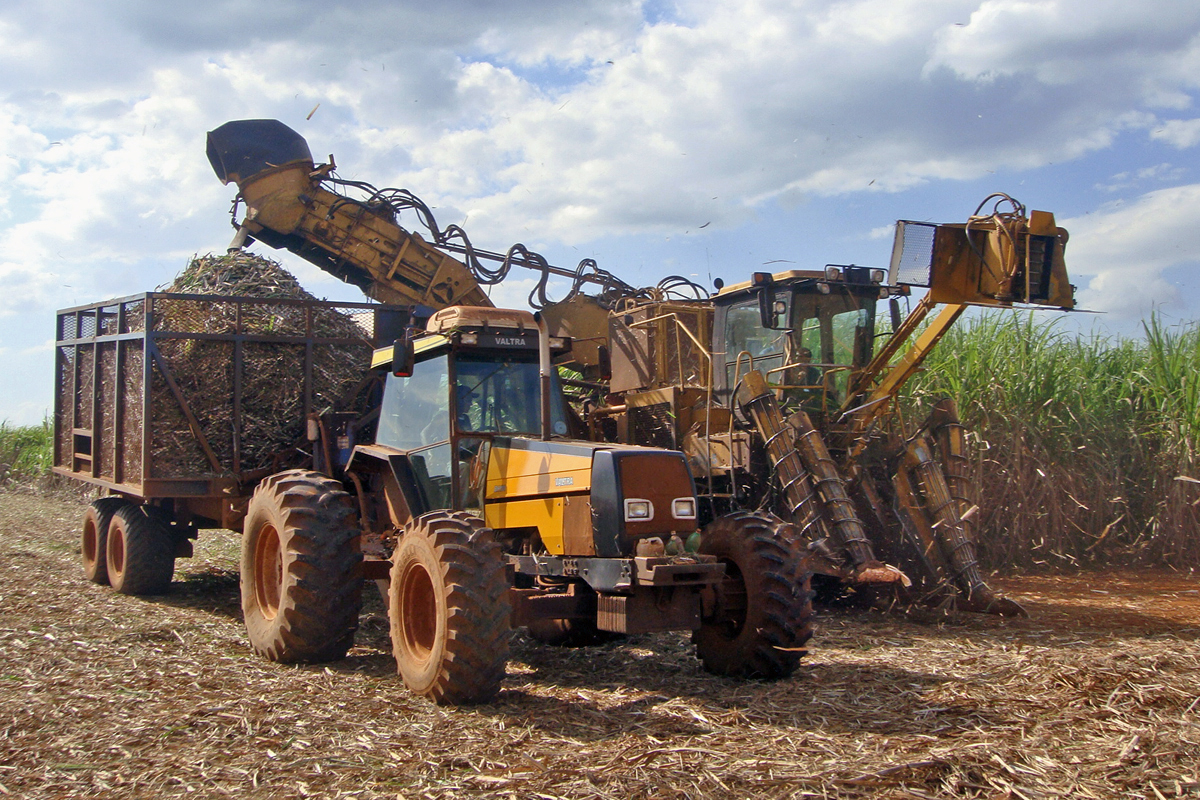
Sugarcane is the main feedstock for the production of ethanol fuel in Brazil.

The inclusion of ILUC in the proposed ruling provoked complaints from ethanol and biodiesel producers. Several environmental organizations welcomed the inclusion of ILUC but criticized the consideration of a 100-year payback scenario, arguing that it underestimated land conversion effects. American corn growers, biodiesel producers, ethanol producers and Brazilian sugarcane ethanol producers complained about EPA's methodology, while the oil industry requested an implementation delay.

On June 26, 2009, the House of Representatives approved the American Clean Energy and Security Act 219 to 212, mandating EPA to exclude ILUC for a 5-year period, vis a vis RFS2. During this period, more research is to be conducted to develop more reliable models and methodologies for estimating ILUC, and Congress will review this issue before allowing EPA to rule on this matter. The bill failed in the U.S. Senate.

On February 3, 2010, EPA issued its final RFS2 rule for 2010 and beyond. The rule incorporated direct and significant indirect emissions including ILUC. EPA incorporated comments and data from new studies. Using a 30-year time horizon and a 0% discount rate, EPA concluded that multiple biofuels would meet this standard.

EPA's analysis accepted both ethanol produced from corn starch and biobutanol from corn starch as "renewable fuels". Ethanol produced from sugarcane became an "advanced fuel". Both diesel produced from algal oils and biodiesel from soy oil and diesel from waste oils, fats, and greases fell in the "biomass-based diesel" category. Cellulosic ethanol and cellulosic diesel met the "cellulosic biofuel" standard.

The table summarizes the mean GHG emissions estimated by EPA modelling and the range of variations considering that the main source of uncertainty in the life cycle analysis is the GHG emissions related to international land use change.

U.S. Environmental Protection Agency Life cycle Year 2022 GHG emissions reduction results for RFS2 final rule (includes direct and indirect land use change effects and a 30-year payback period at a 0% discount rate)
Renewable fuel Pathway (for U.S. consumption)	Mean GHG emission reduction^{(1)}	GHG emission reduction 95% confidence interval^{(2)}	Assumptions/comments
Corn ethanol	21%	7–32%	New or expanded natural gas fired dry mill plant, 37% wet and 63% dry DGS it produces, and employing corn oil fractionation technology.
Corn biobutanol	31%	20–40%	Natural gas fired dry mill plant, 37% wet and 63% dry DGS it produces, and employing corn oil fractionation technology.
Sugarcane ethanol^{(3)}	61%	52–71%	Ethanol is produced and dehydrated in Brazil prior to being imported into the U.S. and the residue is not collected. GHG emissions from ocean tankers hauling ethanol from Brazil to the U.S. are included.
Cellulosic ethanol from switchgrass	110%	102–117%	Ethanol produced using the biochemical process.
Cellulosic ethanol from corn stover	129%	No ILUC	Ethanol produced using the biochemical process. Ethanol produced from agricultural residues does not have any international land use emissions.
Biodiesel from soybean	57%	22–85%	Plant using natural gas.
Waste grease biodiesel	86%	No ILUC	Waste grease feedstock does not have any agricultural or land use emissions.
Notes: (1) Percent reduction in lifecycle GHG emissions compared to the average lifecycle GHG for gasoline or diesel sold or distributed as transportation fuel in 2005. (2) Confidence range accounts for uncertainty in the types of land use change assumptions and the magnitude of resulting GHG emissions. (3) A new Brazil module was develop to model the impact of increased production of Brazilian sugarcane ethanol for use in the U.S. market and the international impacts of Brazilian sugarcane ethanol production. The Brazil module also accounts for the domestic competition between crop and pasture land uses, and allows for livestock intensification (heads of cattle per unit area of land).

===== Reactions =====
UNICA welcomed the ruling, in particular, for the more precise lifecycle emissions estimate and hoped that classification the advanced biofuel designation would help eliminate the tariff.

The U.S. Renewable Fuels Association (RFA) also welcomed the ruling, as ethanol producers "require stable federal policy that provides them the market assurances they need to commercialize new technologies", restating their ILUC objection.

RFA also complained that corn-based ethanol scored only a 21% reduction, noting that without ILUC, corn ethanol achieves a 52% GHG reduction. RFA also objected that Brazilian sugarcane ethanol "benefited disproportionally" because EPA's revisions lowered the initially equal ILUC estimates by half for corn and 93% for sugarcane.

Several Midwestern lawmakers commented that they continued to oppose EPA's consideration of the "dicey science" of indirect land use that "punishes domestic fuels". House Agriculture Chairman Collin Peterson said, "... to think that we can credibly measure the impact of international indirect land use is completely unrealistic, and I will continue to push for legislation that prevents unreliable methods and unfair standards from burdening the biofuels industry."

EPA Administrator Lisa P. Jackson commented that the agency "did not back down from considering land use in its final rules, but the agency took new information into account that led to a more favorable calculation for ethanol". She cited new science and better data on crop yield and productivity, more information on co-products that could be produced from advanced biofuels and expanded land-use data for 160 countries, instead of the 40 considered in the proposed rule.

=== Europe ===
As of 2010, European Union and United Kingdom regulators had recognized the need to take ILUC into account, but had not determined the most appropriate methodology.

==== UK Renewable Transport Fuel Obligation ====
The UK Renewable Transport Fuel Obligation (RTFO) program requires fuel suppliers to report direct impacts, and asked the Renewable Fuels Agency (RFA) to report potential indirect impacts, including ILUC and commodity price changes. The RFA's July 2008 "Gallager Review", mentioned several risks regarding biofuels and required feedstock production to avoid agricultural land that would otherwise be used for food production, despite concluding that "quantification of GHG emissions from indirect land-use change requires subjective assumptions and contains considerable uncertainty". Some environmental groups argued that emissions from ILUC were not being taken into account and could be creating more emissions.

==== European Union ====
On December 17, 2008, the European Parliament approved the Renewable Energy Sources Directive (COM(2008)19) and amendments to the Fuel Quality Directive (Directive 2009/30), which included sustainability criteria for biofuels and mandated consideration of ILUC. The Directive established a 10% biofuel target. A separate Fuel Quality Directive set the EU's Low Carbon Fuel Standard, requiring a 6% reduction in GHG intensity of EU transport fuels by 2020. The legislation ordered the European Commission to develop a methodology to factor in GHG emissions from ILUC by December 31, 2010, based on the best available scientific evidence.

In the meantime, the European Parliament defined lands ineligible for producing biofuel feedstocks for the Directives. This category included wetlands and continuously forested areas with canopy cover of more than 30 percent or cover between 10 and 30 percent given evidence that its existing carbon stock was low enough to justify conversion.

The Commission subsequently published terms of reference for three ILUC modeling exercises: one using a General Equilibrium model; one using a Partial Equilibrium model and one comparing other global modeling exercises. It also consulted on a limited range of high-level options for addressing ILUC to which 17 countries and 59 organizations responded. The United Nations Special Rapporteur on the Right to Food and several environmental organizations complained that the 2008 safeguards were inadequate. UNICA called for regulators to establish an empirical and "globally accepted methodology" to consider ILUC, with the participation of researchers and scientists from biofuel crop-producing countries.

In 2010 some NGOs accused the European Commission of lacking transparency given its reluctance to release documents relating to the ILUC work. In March 2010 the Partial and General Equilibrium Modelling results were made available, with the disclaimer that the EC had not adopted the views contained in the materials. These indicate that a 1.25% increase in EU biofuel consumption would require around 5,000,000 hectares (12,000,000 acres) of land globally.

The scenarios varied from 5.6 to 8.6% of road transport fuels. The study found that ILUC effects offset part of the emission benefits and that above the 5.6% threshold, ILUC emissions increase rapidly. For the expected scenario of 5.6% by 2020, the study estimated that biodiesel production increases would be primarily domestic, while bioethanol production would take place mainly in Brazil, regardless of EU duties. The analysis concluded that eliminating trade barriers would further reduce emissions, because the EU would import more from Brazil. Under this scenario, "direct emission savings from biofuels are estimated at 18 Mt CO_{2}, additional emissions from ILUC at 5.3 Mt CO_{2} (mostly in Brazil), resulting in a global net balance of nearly 13 Mt CO_{2} savings in a 20 years horizon". The study also found that ILUC emissions were much greater for biodiesel from vegetable oil and estimated that in 2020 even at the 5.6% level were over half the greenhouse gas emissions from diesel.

As part of the announcement, the Commission said it would publish a report on ILUC by the end of 2010.

===== Certification system =====
On June 10, 2010, the EC announced its decision to set up certification schemes for biofuels, including imports as part of the Renewable Energy Directive. The Commission encouraged E.U. nations, industry, and NGOs to set up voluntary certification schemes. EC figures for 2007 showed that 26% of biodiesel and 31% of bioethanol used in the E.U. was imported, mainly from Brazil and the United States.

===== Reactions =====
UNICA welcomed the EU efforts to "engage independent experts in its assessments" but requested that improvements because "... the report currently contains a certain number of inaccuracies, so once these are corrected, we anticipate even higher benefits resulting from the use of Brazilian sugarcane ethanol." UNICA highlighted the fact that the report assumed land expansion that "does not take into consideration the agro-ecological zoning for sugarcane in Brazil, which prevents cane from expanding into any type of native vegetation."

Critics said the 10% figure was reduced to 5.6% of transport fuels partly by exaggerating the contribution of electric vehicles (EV) in 2020, as the study assumed EVs would represent 20% of new car sales, two and six times the car industry's own estimate. They also claimed the study "exaggerates to around 45 percent the contribution of bioethanol—the greenest of all biofuels—and consequently downplays the worst impacts of biodiesel."

Environmental groups found that the measures "are too weak to halt a dramatic increase in deforestation". According to Greenpeace, "indirect land-use change impacts of biofuel production still are not properly addressed", which for them was the most dangerous problem of biofuels

Industry representatives welcomed the certification system, but some dismissed concerns regarding the lack of land use criteria. UNICA and other industry groups wanted the gaps in the rules filled to provide a clear operating framework.

The negotiations between the European Parliament and the Council of European Ministers continue. A deal is not foreseen before 2014.

== See also ==
- Biodiesel
- Biofuels by region
- Carbon emissions reporting
- Carbon footprint
- Carbon leakage
- Deforestation in Brazil
- Environmental effects of biodiesel
- Ethanol fuel
- Food vs. fuel
- Issues relating to biofuels
- Land use, land-use change and forestry
- Life cycle assessment
- Low-carbon fuel standard
