= Low-carbon fuel standard =

Rule to reduce carbon intensity of transportation fuels

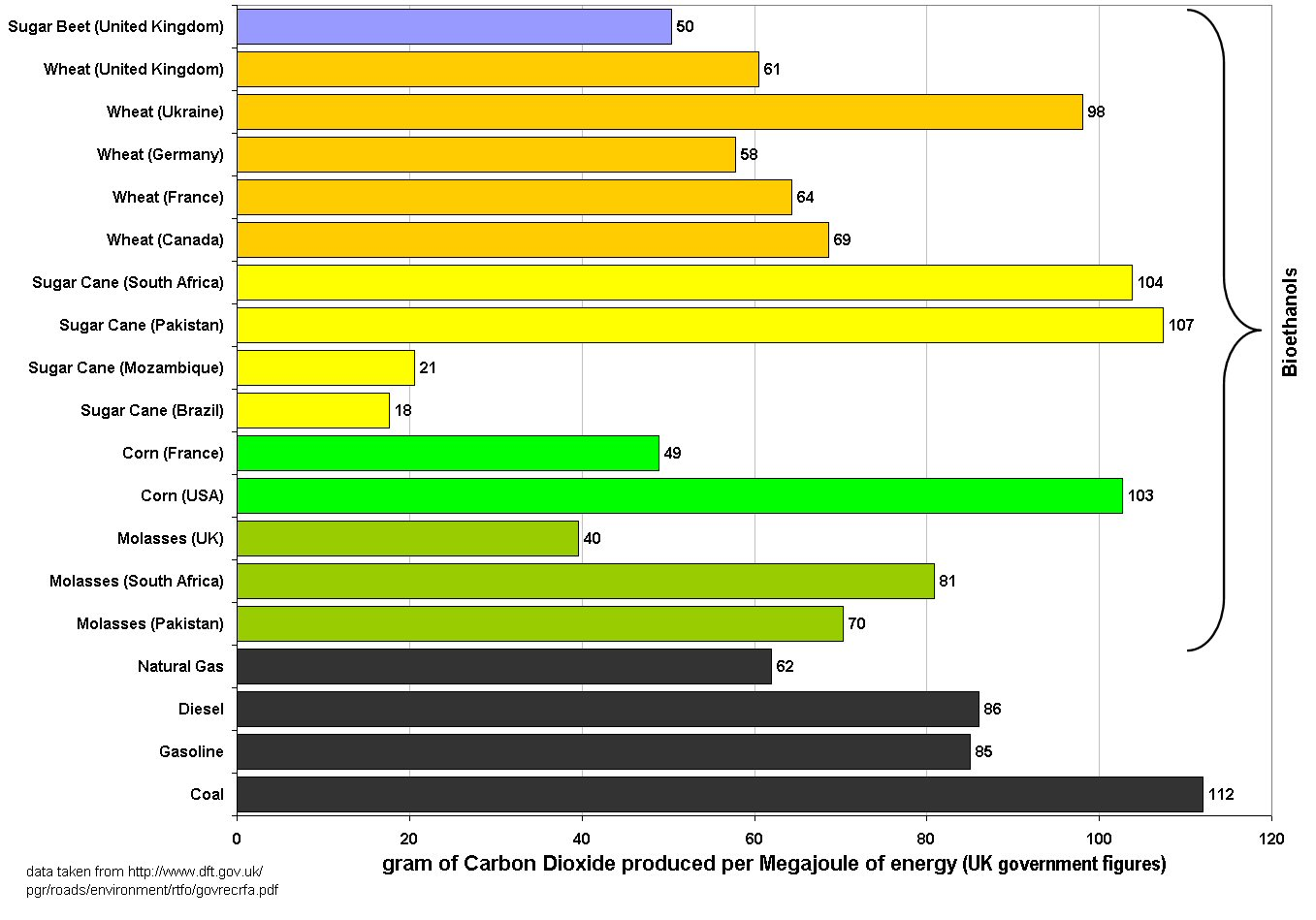
UK figures for the carbon intensity of bioethanol and fossil fuels. This graph assumes that all bioethanols are burnt in their country of origin and that previously existing cropland is used to grow the feedstock. No indirect land-use changes are included.

A low-carbon fuel standard (LCFS) is an emissions trading rule designed to reduce the average carbon intensity of transportation fuels in a given jurisdiction, as compared to conventional petroleum fuels, such as gasoline and diesel. The most common methods for reducing transportation carbon emissions are supplying electricity to electric vehicles, supplying hydrogen fuel to fuel cell vehicles and blending biofuels, such as ethanol, biodiesel, renewable diesel, and renewable natural gas into fossil fuels. The main purpose of a low-carbon fuel standard is to decrease carbon dioxide emissions associated with vehicles powered by various types of internal combustion engines while also considering the entire life cycle ("well to wheels"), in order to reduce the carbon footprint of transportation.

The first low-carbon fuel standard mandate in the world was enacted by California in 2007, with specific eligibility criteria defined by the California Air Resources Board (CARB) in April 2009 but taking effect in January 2011. Similar legislation was approved in British Columbia in April 2008, and by European Union which proposed its legislation in January 2007 and which was adopted in December 2008. The United Kingdom is implementing its Renewable Transport Fuel Obligation Program, which also applies the concept of low-carbon fuels.

Several bills have been proposed in the United States for similar low-carbon fuel regulation at a national level but with less stringent standards than California. As of early 2010 none have been approved. The U.S. Environmental Protection Agency (EPA) issued its final rule regarding the expanded Renewable Fuel Standard (RFS2) for 2010 and beyond on February 3, 2010. This ruling, as mandated by the Energy Independence and Security Act of 2007 (EISA), included direct emissions and significant indirect emissions from land use changes.

== California Low-Carbon Fuel Standard ==
Californian Governor Arnold Schwarzenegger issued Executive Order S-1-07 on January 19, 2007, to enact a low-carbon fuel standard (LCFS). The LCFS requires oil refineries and distributors to ensure that the mix of fuel they sell in the Californian market meets the established declining targets for greenhouse gas (GHG) emissions measured in CO_{2}-equivalent grams per unit of fuel energy sold for transport purposes. The LCFS directive calls for a reduction of at least 10 percent in the carbon intensity of California's transportation fuels by 2020. These reductions include not only tailpipe emissions but also all other associated emissions from production, distribution and use of transport fuels within the state. Therefore, California LCFS considers the fuel's full life cycle, also known as the "well to wheels" or "seed to wheels" efficiency of transport fuels. The standard is also aimed to reduce the state's dependence on petroleum, create a market for clean transportation technology, and stimulate the production and use of alternative, low-carbon fuels in California. There have been efforts to change the intensity measurement model from the CARB GREET model to the Argonne GREET model in order to more fully capture the carbon intensity impact of the fuels.

The LCFS is a mix of command and control regulation and emissions trading, as it will use market-based mechanisms that allow providers to choose how they will reduce emissions while responding to consumer demand. Some believe that oil companies could opt for several actions to comply. For example, they state that refiners and producers could improve the efficiency of the refineries and upstream production, or may purchase and blend more low-carbon ethanol into gasoline products, or purchase credits from electric utilities supplying low carbon electrons to electric passenger vehicles, or diversifying and selling low carbon hydrogen for use by vehicles as a product, or any new strategy as the standard is being designed. The California Global Warming Solutions Act of 2006 authorized the establishment of emissions trading in California, with rules to be adopted by 2010, and taking effect no later than January 2012.

=== Regulatory proceedings ===
In accordance to the California Global Warming Solutions Act of 2006 and the Governor's Directive, the California Air Resources Board is the agency responsible for developing the "Low-Carbon Fuel Standard Program", and it was directed to initiate the regulatory proceedings to establish and implement the LCFS." CARB identified the LCFS as an early action item with a regulation to be adopted and implemented by 2010. Also Executive Order S-1-07 ordered the California Environmental Protection Agency to coordinate activities between the University of California, the California Energy Commission and other state agencies to develop and propose a draft compliance schedule to meet the 2020 target.

As mandated by the Executive Order, a University of California team, led by Daniel Sperling of UC Davis and the late Alexander E. Farrell (UC Berkeley), developed two reports that established the technical feasibility of an LCFS, proposed the methodology to calculate the full life cycle GHG emissions from all fuels sold in the state, identified technical and policy issues, and provided a number of specific recommendations, thus providing an initial framework for the development of CARB's LCFS. This study was presented by Governor Schwarzenegger in May 2007 and they were the backbone of CARB's initial efforts to develop the LCFS, even though not all of the specific recommendations were incorporated in the final LCFS staff's proposed regulation.

==== Public consultation process ====
During 2008 and until the April 2009 LCFS ruling, CARB published in its website all technical reports prepared by its staff and collaborators regarding the definition and calculations related to the proposed LCFS regulation, conducted 16 public workshops, and also submitted its studies for external peer review. Before the April 23, 2009 ruling, the Board held a 45-day public hearing that received 229 comments, 21 of which were presented during the Board Hearing.

==== Controversy about indirect land use impacts ====
Among relevant and controversial comments submitted to CARB as public letters, on June 24, 2008, a group of 27 scientists and researchers from a number of universities and national laboratories, expressed their concerns arguing that there "is not enough hard empirical data to base any sound policy regulation in regards to the indirect impacts of renewable biofuels production. The field is relative new, especially when compared to the vast knowledge base present in fossil fuel production, and the limited analyses are driven by assumptions that sometimes lack robust empirical validation." With a similar opposing position, on October 23, 2008, a letter submitted to CARB by the New Fuels Alliance, representing more than two-dozen advanced biofuel companies, researchers and investors, questioned the Board intention to include indirect land use change (ILUC). In another public letter just before the ruling meeting, more than 170 scientists and economists sent a letter to CARB, urging it to account for GHG emissions from indirect land use change for biofuels and all other transportation fuels. They argued that "...there are uncertainties inherent in estimating the magnitude of indirect land use emissions from biofuels, but assigning a value of zero is clearly not supported by the science."

=== 2009 Ruling ===
On April 23, 2009, CARB approved the specific rules and carbon intensity reference values for the LCFS that will go into effect on January 1, 2011. The technical proposal was approved without modifications by a 9–1 vote, to set the 2020 maximum carbon intensity reference value for gasoline to 86 grams of carbon dioxide equivalent released per megajoule of energy produced. One standard was established for gasoline and the alternative fuels that can replace it, and a second similar standard is set for diesel fuel and its replacements. The regulation is based on an average declining standard of carbon intensity that is expected to achieve 16 million metric tons of greenhouse gas emission reductions by 2020. CARB expects the new generation of fuels to come from the development of technology that uses cellulosic ethanol from algae, wood, agricultural waste such as straw and switchgrass, and also natural gas from municipal solid waste. They also expect the standard to drive the availability of plug-in hybrid, battery electric and fuel-cell powered cars while promoting investment in infrastructure for electric charging stations and hydrogen fueling stations.

The ruling is controversial. Representatives of the US ethanol industry complained that this rule overstates the environmental effects of corn ethanol, and also criticized the inclusion of indirect effects of land-use changes as an unfair penalty to home-made corn ethanol because deforestation in the developing world is being tied to US ethanol production. The initial reference value set for 2011 for LCFS means that Mid-west corn ethanol will not meet the California standard unless current carbon intensity is reduced. Oil industry representatives complained that there is a cost associated to the new standard, as the LCFS will limit the use of corn ethanol blended in gasoline, thus leaving oil refiners with few available and viable options, such as sugarcane ethanol from Brazil, but this option means paying costly U.S. import tariffs. CARB officials and environmentalists reject such scenario because they think there will be plenty of time and economic incentive to developed inexpensive biofuels, hydrogen-based fuels, even ethanol from such cellulosic materials, or new ways to make ethanol out of corn with a smaller carbon footprint.

Brazilian ethanol producers (UNICA), though they welcomed the ruling as they consider their sugarcane ethanol have passed a critical test and expect their biofuel to enter the California market in the future, UNICA also urged CARB to update the data and assumptions used, which according to them, is excessively penalizing their ethanol and is not reflecting the technology and agricultural practices currently in use in Brazil. UNICA disagreed with the assertion that indirect land-use changes can be accurately calculated with the current methodologies. Canadian officials also complained the standard could become an entry barrier to their Alberta oil sands, as producers will have to significantly reduce their emissions or purchase expensive credits from alternative energy producers in order for their non-conventional oil to be sold in California. They complained that the measure could be discriminating against Canadian oil sands crude as a high carbon intensity crude oil, while other heavy crude oils from other sources were not evaluated by CARB's studies.

The only Board member who voted against the ruling explained that he had "hard time accepting the fact that we’re going to ignore the comments of 125 scientists", referring to the letter submitted by a group of scientists questioning the indirect land use change penalty. "They said the model was not good enough... to use at this time as a component part of such an historic new standard." CARB adopted only one main amendment to the staff proposal to bolster the standard review process, moving up the expected date of an expert working group to report on indirect land use change from January 2012 to January 2011. This change is expected to provide for a thoroughly review of the specific penalty for indirect land use change and correct it if possible. The CARB staff is also expected to report back to the Board on indirect impacts of other fuel pathways before the commencement of the standard in 2011.

Fuels were rated based on their carbon intensity, estimated in terms of the quantity of grams of carbon dioxide equivalent released for every megajoule of energy produced for their full life cycle, also referred to as the fuel pathway. Carbon intensity was estimated considering the direct carbon footprint for each fuel, and for biofuels the indirect land-use effects were also included. The resulting intensities for the main biofuels readily available are the following:

California carbon intensity values for gasoline and fuels that substitute for gasoline (grams of carbon dioxide equivalent released per megajoule of energy produced)
Fuel type	Carbon intensity	Carbon intensity including land-use changes	Comments
Midwest ethanol	75.10	105.10	Mainly made from corn. Includes some of the plant's power coming from coal.
California gasoline	95.86	95.86	Gasohol with 10% ethanol.
CARB LCFS 2011	n/a	95.61	Maximum allowed in 2011 (initial). Might be reviewed as more studies are available.
CARB LCFS 2020	n/a	86.27	Maximum allowed by 2020. Might be reviewed as more studies are available.
California ethanol	50.70	80.70	Considers plant's power coming from natural gas.
Brazilian ethanol	27.40	73.40	Made from sugarcane and ship transport Brazil-California included
CNG: via pipeline	67.70	67.70	North American natural gas compressed in California.
CNG: landfill gas	11.26	11.26	Derived from landfills in California.
Note: the complete lifecycle analysis for these fuels and others considered such as cellulosic ethanol (farmed trees and forest waste), electricity (California average electricity mix), hydrogen (gaseous hydrogen from North American natural gas) and biodiesel (soybean) are available at CARB's website (see Lifecycle Analysis)

The LCFS standards established in CARB's rulemaking will be periodically reviewed. The first formal review will occur by January 1, 2011. Additional reviews are expected to be conducted approximately every three years thereafter, or as necessary. The 2011 review will consider the status of efforts to develop low carbon fuels, the compliance schedule, updated technical information, and provide recommendations on metrics to address the sustainable production of low carbon fuels.

According to CARB's ruling, providers of transportation fuels must demonstrate that the mix of fuels they supply meet the LCFS intensity standards for each annual compliance period. They must report all fuels provided and track the fuels’ carbon intensity through a system of "credits" and "deficits." Credits are generated from fuels with lower carbon intensity than the standard. Deficits result from the use of fuels with higher carbon intensity than the standard. A fuel provider meets its compliance obligation by ensuring that amount of credits it earns (or otherwise acquires from another party) is equal to, or greater than, the deficits it has incurred. Credits and deficits are generally determined based on the amount of fuel sold, the carbon intensity of the fuel, and the efficiency by which a vehicle converts the fuel into usable energy. Credits may be banked and traded within the LCFS market to meet obligations.

Two "lookup tables" (similar to the one above) and its carbon intensity values are part of the regulation, one for gasoline and another for diesel. The carbon intensity values can only be amended or expanded by regulatory amendments, and the Board delegated to the Executive Officer the responsibility to conduct the necessary rulemaking hearings and take final action on any amendments, other than amending indirect land-use change values included in the lookup tables.

=== Latest Developments ===
California-Modified GREET Pathways for Brazilian sugarcane ethanol (grams of CO_{2} equivalent released per megajoule of energy produced)
Fuel type	Carbon intensity	Carbon intensity including land-use changes	Comments
Average Brazilian ethanol	27.40	73.40	Baseline pathway
Mechanized harvesting and co-product bioelectricity	12.20	58.20	Scenario 1
Mechanized harvesting	20.40	66.40	Scenario 2
Note: for all scenarios indirect land use change effects are the same and CARB estimate is 46 gCO_{2}e/MJ.

On July 20, 2009, CARB published a Notice of Public Availability of modified text and availability of additional documents regarding the April 2009 rule making (Resolution 09–31), open for public comment until August 19. The supporting documents and information added to the rule making record include new pathways for Liquefied Natural Gas (LNG) from several sources, Compressed Natural Gas (CNG) from dairy digester biogas, biodiesel produced in California from used cooking oil, renewable diesel produced in California from tallow (U.S. sourced), and two additional new pathways for Brazilian sugarcane ethanol which reflect best practices already implemented in some regions of the country.

The two additional scenarios for sugarcane ethanol were requested by the Board in order to account for improved harvesting practices and the export of electricity from sugarcane ethanol plants in Brazil using energy from bagasse. These two scenarios are not to be considered average for all of Brazilian ethanol but specific cases when such practices are adopted in Brazil. Scenario 1 considers mechanized harvesting of cane which is gradually replacing the traditional practice of burning straw before harvesting cane, and the sale of electricity (co-generated) from power plants that are capable of exporting additional energy beyond that required for processing in the plant (co-product credit). Scenario 2 only considers the export of electricity (co-product) from power plants capable of producing the additional electricity for export. The assumptions or values for the baseline pathway published in February 2009 are the same, including the estimates of indirect land use change for all Brazilian sugarcane scenarios.

In December 2009 the Renewable Fuels Association (RFA) and Growth Energy, two U.S. ethanol lobbying groups, filed a lawsuit in the Federal District Court in Fresno, California, challenging the constitutionality of the California Low Carbon Fuel Standard (LCFS). The two organizations argued that the LCFS violates both the Supremacy Clause and the Commerce Clause of the US Constitution, and "jeopardizes the nationwide market for ethanol". In a press release both associations announced that "If the United States is going to have a low carbon fuel standard, it must be based on sound science and it must be consistent with the U.S. Constitution..." and that "One state cannot dictate policy for all the others, yet that is precisely what California has aimed to do through a poorly conceived and, frankly, unconstitutional LCFS." Additional lawsuits against the California regulation were filed by refiners and truckers including Rocky Mountain Farmers Union; Redwood County Minnesota Corn and Soybean Growers; Penny Newman Grain, Inc.; Red Nederend; Fresno County Farm Bureau; Nisei Farmers League; California Dairy Campaign; National Petrochemical and Refiners Association; American Trucking Associations; Center for North American Energy Security; and the Consumer Energy Alliance.

In December 2011 a federal judge granted a preliminary injunction against the implementation of California's LCFS. In three separate rulings the judge rejected CARB's defense as he concluded that the state acted unconstitutionally and the regulation "impermissibly treads into the province and powers of our federal government, reaches beyond its boundaries to regulate activity wholly outside of its borders." CARB announced it intends to appeal the decision. The Ninth Circuit Court of Appeals issued a stay of the injunction on 23 April 2012 during the tendency of the litigation. In other words, the challenge to the constitutionality of the LCFS continues, but until it is resolved there is no bar on the CARB continuing to enforce the LCFS. (While the stay did not specifically authorize a return to the LCFS, CARB argued in its briefs before the Court that a stay would "permit the LCFS to go back into effect as though the injunction had never been issued". That is the approach currently taken by CARB and it continues to refine carbon intensity standards and applicability).

In 2011, a provision was added to the LCFS that allows refiners to receive credits for the deployment of innovative crude production technologies, such as carbon capture and sequestration or solar steam generation. Solar thermal enhanced oil recovery is a form of enhanced oil recovery (EOR), which is key to harvesting California's heavy crude. Currently, California uses EOR to help produce about 60% of its crude output. By using solar power instead of natural gas to create steam for EOR, solar steam generation reduces the amount of emissions produced during oil extraction, thus lowering the overall carbon intensity of crude. California currently has two solar EOR projects in operation, one in McKittrick, operated by LINN Energy (formerly Berry Petroleum) using enclosed trough technology from GlassPoint Solar, and another in Coalinga operated by Chevron Corporation using BrightSource Energy power tower technology.

CARB is currently considering an amendment to allow upstream operators to receive credits for deploying innovative crude production technologies.

In 2015, California's LCFS was re-adopted in order to address some of the issues in the original proposed standard. A number of the changes were made, including updated crude provisions, a new model used to be used to calculate carbon intensity, the establishment of a "Credit Clearance" process that would take effect at the end of the year should the LCFS credit market become too competitive, and other provisions.

In May 2016, the Seneca Solar Project became the first facility to start earning LCFS credits. Located in the North Midway Sunset oil field in Taft, Kern County, California, this facility met the threshold of 0.10gCO2/ MJ carbon intensity (CI) reduction.

Shortly after that, in August 2016, the SB 32 was passed, which changed the target for green house gas (GHG) reduction to 40% below the levels in 1990, to be achieved by 2030. It is anticipated that this will lead to the tightening of LCFS standards from 2020 all the way through 2030.

In November 2017, GlassPoint announced a partnership with Aera Energy to bring its enclosed trough technology to the South Belridge Oil Field, near Bakersfield, California. When done, the facility will be California's largest solar EOR field. It is projected to produce approximately 12 million barrels of steam per year through a 850MW thermal solar steam generator. It will also cut carbon emissions from the facility by 376,000 metric tons per year.

In 2019, concluding a long-running challenge to the constitutionality of the California LCFS, the Ninth Circuit Court of Appeals ruled that the 2015 LCFS did not violate the Commerce Clause of the United States Constitution.

== US National Low-Carbon Fuel Standard ==
Using California's LCFS as a model, several bills have been presented to establish a national low-carbon fuel standards at the federal level.

=== 2007 ===
Senators Barbara Boxer, Dianne Feinstein, and future President Barack Obama introduced in 2007 competing bills with varying versions of California's LCFS.

- In March 2007, Senator Dianne Feinstein sponsored the "Clean Fuels and Vehicles Bill", which would have reduced emissions from motor vehicle fuels by 10 percent below projected levels by 2030, and would have required fuel suppliers to increase the percentage of low-carbon fuels – biodiesel, E-85 (made with cellulosic ethanol), hydrogen, electricity, and others – in the motor vehicle fuel supply.
- California Senator Barbara Boxer presented on May 3, 2007, the "Advanced Clean Fuels Act of 2007". This bill was an amendment to the Clean Air Act to promote the use of advanced clean fuels that help reduce air and water pollution and protect the environment.
- Then Senator Obama introduced his bill on May 7, 2007. The "National Low Carbon Fuel Standard Act of 2007" would have required fuel refineries to reduce the lifecycle greenhouse gas emissions of the transportation fuels sold in the U.S. by 5 percent in 2015 and 10 percent in 2020.

=== 2009 ===
In March 2009, the Waxman-Markey Climate Bill was introduced in the U.S. House Committee on Energy and Commerce, and it has been praised by top Obama Administration officials. The bill requires a slightly higher targets for reductions in emissions of carbon dioxide, methane, and other greenhouse gases than those proposed by President Barack Obama. The bill proposed a 20-percent emissions reduction from 2005 levels by 2020 (Obama had proposed a 14 percent reduction by 2020). Both plans aim to reduce emissions by about 80 percent by 2050. The Climate Change Bill was approved by the U.S. House of Representatives on June 26, 2009. As approved, emissions would be cut 17 percent from 2005 levels by 2020, and 83 percent by 2050.

=== EPA Renewable Fuel Standard ===
The Energy Independence and Security Act of 2007 (EISA) established new renewable fuel categories and eligibility requirements, setting mandatory life cycle greenhouse gas emissions thresholds for renewable fuel categories, as compared to those of average petroleum fuels used in 2005. EISA definition of life cycle GHG emissions explicitly mandated the U.S. Environmental Protection Agency (EPA) to include "direct emissions and significant indirect emissions such as significant emissions from land use changes."

On May 5, 2009, the U.S. Environmental Protection Agency (EPA) released its notice of proposed rulemaking for implementation of the 2007 modification of the Renewable Fuel Standard (RFS). The draft of the regulations was released for public comment during a 60-day period. EPA's proposed regulations also included the carbon footprint from indirect land-use changes, which, as CARB's ruling, caused controversy among ethanol producers. On the same day, President Barack Obama signed a Presidential Directive with the aim to advance biofuels research and improve their commercialization. The Directive established a Biofuels Interagency Working Group which has the mandate to come up with policy ideas for increasing investment in next-generation fuels, such as cellulosic ethanol, and for reducing the environmental footprint of growing biofuels crops, particularly corn-based ethanol.

An amendment was introduced in the House Appropriations Committee during the discussion of the fiscal 2010 Interior and Environment spending bill, aimed to prohibit EPA to consider indirect land-use changes in the RFS2 ruling for five years. This amendment was rejected on June 18, 2009, by a 30 to 29 vote. A similar amendment to the Waxman-Markey Climate Bill was introduced in the U.S. House Committee on Energy and Commerce. The Climate Bill was approved by the U.S. House of Representatives with a vote of 219 to 212, and included a mandate for EPA to exclude any estimation of international indirect land use changes due to biofuels for a five-year period for the purposes of the RFS2. During this period, more research is to be conducted to develop more reliable models and methodologies for estimating ILUC. By 2010 the bill is awaiting approval by the U.S. Senate.

EISA Standards for 2010
Fuel Category	Percentage of Fuel Required to be Renewable	Volume of Renewable Fuel (in billion gal)
Cellulosic biofuel	0.004%	0.0065
Biomass-based diesel	1.10%^{(1)}	1.15^{(1)}
Total Advanced biofuel	0.61%	0.95
Renewable fuel	8.25%	12.95
Notes: (1) Combined 2009/2010 biomass-based diesel volumes applied in 2010.

On February 3, 2010, EPA issued its final rule regarding the expanded Renewable Fuel Standard (RFS2) for 2010 and beyond. The final rule revises the annual renewable fuel standards, and the required renewable fuel volume continues to increase reaching 36 billion gallons (136.3 billion liters) by 2022. For 2010, EISA set a total renewable fuel standard of 12.95 billion gallons (49.0 billion liters). This total volume, presented as a fraction of a refiner's or importer's gasoline and diesel volume, must be renewable fuel. The final 2010 standards set by EPA are shown in the table in the right side.

As mandated by law, and in order to establish the fuel category for each biofuel, EPA included in its modeling direct emissions and significant indirect emissions such as emissions from land use changes related to the full lifecycle. EPA's modeling of specific fuel pathways incorporated comments received through the third-party peer review process, and data and information from new studies and public comments. EPA's analysis determined that both ethanol produced from corn starch and biobutanol from corn starch comply with the 20% GHG emission reduction threshold required to classify as a renewable fuel. EISA grandfathered existing U.S. corn ethanol plants, and only requires the 20% reduction in life cycle GHG emissions for any renewable fuel produced at new facilities that commenced construction after December 19, 2007.

EPA also determined that ethanol produced from sugarcane, both in Brazil and Caribbean Basin Initiative countries, complies with the applicable 50% GHG reduction threshold for the advanced fuel category. Both diesel produced from algal oils and biodiesel from soy oil and renewable diesel from waste oils, fats, and greases complies with the 50% GHG threshold for the biomass-based diesel category. Cellulosic ethanol and cellulosic diesel (based on currently modeled pathways) comply with the 60% GHG reduction threshold applicable to cellulosic biofuels.

The following table summarizes the mean GHG emissions estimated and the range of variations considering that the main source of uncertainty in the life cycle analysis is the emissions related to international land use change GHG emissions.

U.S. Environmental Protection Agency Life cycle Year 2022 GHG emissions reduction results for RFS2 final rule (includes direct and indirect land use change effects and a 30-year payback period at a 0% discount rate)
Renewable fuel Pathway (for U.S. consumption)	Mean GHG emission reduction^{(1)}	GHG emission reduction 95% confidence interval^{(2)}	EISA category	Assumptions/comments
Corn ethanol	21%	7-32%	Renewable fuel	Natural gas fired dry mill plant, drying 63% of the DGS it produces and employing corn oil fractionation technology.
Corn biobutanol	31%	20-40%	Renewable fuel	Natural gas fired dry mill plant, drying 63% of the DGS it produces and employing corn oil fractionation technology.
Sugarcane ethanol^{(3)}	61%	52-71%	Advanced biofuel	Ethanol is produced and dehydrated in Brazil prior to being imported into the U.S. and the residue is not collected. GHG emissions from ocean tankers bringing ethanol from Brazil to the U.S. are included.
Cellulosic ethanol from switchgrass	110%	102-117%	Cellulosic biofuel	Ethanol produced using the biochemical process.
Cellulosic ethanol from corn stover	129%	No ILUC	Cellulosic biofuel	Ethanol produced using the biochemical process. Ethanol produced from agricultural residues does not have any international land use emissions.
Soybean-based biodiesel	57%	22-85%	Biomass-based diesel	Plant using natural gas
Waste grease biodiesel	86%	No ILUC	Biomass-based diesel	Waste grease feedstock does not have any agricultural or land use emissions.
Notes: (1) Percent reduction in lifecycle GHG emissions compared to the average lifecycle GHG for gasoline or diesel sold or distributed as transportation fuel in 2005. (2) Confidence range accounts for uncertainty in the types of land use change assumptions and the magnitude of resulting GHG emissions. (3) EPA develop a new Brazil module to model the impact of increased production of Brazilian sugarcane ethanol for use in the U.S. market and the international impacts of Brazilian sugarcane ethanol production. The Brazil module also accounts for the domestic competition between crop and pasture land uses, and allows for livestock intensification (heads of cattle per unit area of land).

UNICA, a Brazilian ethanol producers association, welcomed the ruling and commented that they hope the classification of Brazilian sugarcane ethanol as an advanced biofuel will contribute to influence those who seek to lift the trade barriers imposed against clean energy, both in the U.S. and the rest of the world. EPA's final ruling is expected to benefit Brazilian producers, as the blending mandate requires an increasing quota of advanced biofuels, which is not likely to be fulfill with cellulosic ethanol, and then it would force blenders to import more Brazilian sugarcane-based ethanol, despite the existing 54¢ per gallon tariff on ethanol imported directly from Brazil.

In the case of corn-based ethanol, EPA said that manufacturers would need to use “advanced efficient technologies” during production to meet RSF2 limits. The U.S. Renewable Fuels Association also welcomed the ruling, as ethanol producers "require stable federal policy that provides them the market assurances they need to commercialize new technologies." However, they complained that "EPA continues to rely on oft-challenged and unproven theories such as international indirect land use change to penalize U.S. biofuels to the advantage of imported ethanol and petroleum."

== Other U.S. regional proposals and programs ==
Eleven U.S. Northeast and Mid-Atlantic states have committed to analyzing a single low-carbon fuel standard for the entire region, driving commercialization and creating a larger market for fuels with low carbon intensity. The standard is aimed to reduce greenhouse gas emissions from fuels for vehicles and other uses, including fuel used for heating buildings, industrial processes, and electricity generation. Ten of these states are members of the Regional Greenhouse Gas Initiative (RGGI). California Air Resources Board (CARB) staff has been coordinating with representatives of these States. The states developing a regional LCFS are Connecticut, Delaware, Maine, Maryland, Massachusetts, New Hampshire, New Jersey, New York, Pennsylvania, Rhode Island, and Vermont.

A Memorandum of Understanding concerning the development of the regional low carbon fuel standard program was signed by the Governors of each State on December 30, 2009, committing the states to an economic analysis of the program, consultation with stakeholders before ruling, and a draft model rule by early 2011.

=== The Oregon Clean Fuels Program ===
In 2009, Oregon's legislature authorized the state's Department of Environmental Quality to create a standard with the same essential structure as California's LCFS. DEQ began full implementation of the program starting in 2016. The Oregon Clean Fuels Standard (CFS) explicitly draws on life-cycle greenhouse gas intensity calculations created or approved by the California Air Resources Board for the LCFS.

By early 2019, the path of CFS credit prices seemed to suggest some de facto linkage between the California and Oregon programs. Although Oregon's credit prices have been generally lower, Oregon has experienced a similar upward movement in prices in the 2016-2018 period, in parallel with California credit price increases.

=== Washington Clean Fuel Standard ===
The state of Washington is implementing a clean fuel standard which will require carbon intensity of its transportation fuels to 20% below 2017 levels by 2034.

== British Columbia Low-Carbon Fuel Requirements ==
The Legislative Assembly of British Columbia, Canada, approved in April 2008 the Renewable and Low Carbon Fuel Requirements Act, which mandates fuel suppliers in B.C. to sell gasoline and diesel containing 5% and 4% percent renewable fuels, respectively, by 2010, and allows the provincial government to set thresholds for the carbon intensity of fuels, taking into account their entire carbon footprint. The RLCFR Act also provides flexibility for regulated fuel suppliers to meet their obligations as they may receive notional transfers of renewable fuels and of attributable greenhouse gas emissions.

== Canada Clean fuel regulations ==
At a national level, Canada is implementing regulations to require liquid fossil fuel providers to reduce the carbon intensity of their fuels to 15% below 2016 levels by the year 2030.

== Europe ==
=== Existing regulations ===
The EU has mainly acted to mitigate road transport greenhouse emissions mainly through its voluntary agreement on CO_{2} emissions from cars and subsequently through Regulation 443/2009 which sets mandatory CO_{2} emission limits for new cars. The EU promoted the use of biofuels through the directive on the promotion of the use of biofuels and other renewable fuels for transport (2003/30/EC), also known as Biofuel Directive, which calls for countries across the EU aiming at replacing 5,75% of all transport fossil fuels (petrol and diesel) with biofuels by 2010. None of these regulations, however, were based on carbon intensity of fuel. Fuel quality standards in the European Union are regulated by Directive 98/70/EC.

Other European countries have their own mandates limiting consumption of conventional fossil fuels by substituting to cleaner fuels in order to reduce greenhouse gas emissions, such as the United Kingdom Renewable Transport Fuel Obligation Program (RTFO), requiring transport fuel suppliers to ensure that 5% of all road vehicle fuel comes from sustainable renewable sources by 2010.

=== UK Renewable Transport Fuel Obligation ===
The Renewable Transport Fuel Obligation is similar to California's LCFS in some aspects. Biofuel suppliers are required to report on the level of carbon savings and sustainability of the biofuels they supplied in order to receive Renewable Transport Fuel Certificates (RTFCs). Suppliers have to report on both the net GHG savings and the sustainability of the biofuels they supply according to the appropriate sustainability standards of the feedstocks from which they are produced and any potential indirect impacts of biofuel production, such as indirect land-use change or changes to food and other commodity prices that are beyond the control of individual suppliers. Suppliers that do not submit a report will not be eligible for RTFO certificates.

Certificates can be claimed when renewable fuels are supplied and fuel duty is paid on them. At the end of the obligation period, these certificates may be redeemed to the RTFO Administrator to demonstrate compliance. Certificates can be traded, therefore, if obligated suppliers don't have enough certificates at the end of an obligation period they have to 'buy-out' the balance of their obligation by paying a buy-out price. The buy out price will be 15 pence per litre in the first two years.

=== EU low-carbon fuel standard ===
On January 31, 2007, the European Commission (EC) proposed new standards for transport fuels to reduce full life cycle emissions by up to 10 percent between 2011 and 2020 This was three weeks after the California LCFS Directive was announced. The EU proposal aimed to encourage the development of low-carbon fuels and biofuels, considering reductions in greenhouse gas emissions caused by the production, transport and use of the suppliers fuels.

In December 2008 the European Parliament, among other measures to address climate change in the European Union, approved amendments to the fuel quality directive (98/70) as well as replacing the Biofuels Directive with a Directive on the promotion of Renewable Energy Sources as proposed by the European Commission. The revision of Directive 98/07/EC introduced a mechanism to monitor and reduce greenhouse gas emissions from the use of road transport fuels, requiring fuel suppliers to reduce GHG emissions by up to 10 percent by 2020 on a life cycle basis. Regarding land use changes, the EC was ordered to "develop a concrete methodology to minimise greenhouse gas emissions caused by indirect land use changes." The fuel directive includes provisions to promote sustainable biofuels which minimized the impacts of ILUC. The approved goal of 10 percent reduction in greenhouse gas emissions can be achieved in several ways, and not exclusively from low-carbon fuels:

- At least 6% by 31 December 2020, compared to the EU-average level of life cycle greenhouse gas emissions per unit of energy from fossil fuels in 2010, obtained through the use of biofuels, alternative fuels and reductions in flaring and venting at production sites.
- A further 2% reduction (subject to a review) obtained through the use of environmentally friendly carbon capture and storage technologies and electric vehicles.
- An additional further 2% reduction obtained through the purchase of credits under the Clean Development Mechanism of the Kyoto Protocol.

The commission is continuing development of the EU LCFS, in particular on the methodology for fossil fuel emissions, has recently consulted on various aspects of the implementation and responses have been published. Further work is underway to address Indirect Land Use Change emissions. Two modelling exercises and a model comparison exercise are being carried out to better understand the scale and nature of indirect land use change due to biofuels before the Commission makes proposals to address it.

On June 10, 2010, the EC adopted guidelines explaining how the Renewable Energy Directive (RED) should be implemented, as the Directive came into effect in December 2010. Three measures focus on the criteria for sustainability of biofuels and how to control that only sustainable biofuels are used in the EU. First, the commission is encouraging E.U. nations, industry and NGOs to set up voluntary schemes to certify biofuel sustainability. Second, the EC laid down the rules to protect untouched nature, such as forests, wetlands and protected areas, and third, a set of rules to guarantee that biofuels deliver substantial reduction in well-to-wheel greenhouse gas emissions.

==== Sustainable biofuel certificates ====
The EC decided to request governments, industry and NGO's to set up voluntary schemes to certify biofuel sustainability for all types of biofuels, including those imported into the EU. According to the EC, the overall majority of biofuels are produced in the EU, and for 2007, only 26% of biodiesel and 31% of bioethanol consumed in the EU was imported, mainly from Brazil and the United States. The Commission set standards that must be met for these schemes to gain EU recognition. One of the main criteria is that the certification scheme must be interdependently audited and fraud-resistant. Auditors must check the whole production chain, from the farmer and mill to the filling station (well-to-wheel life cycle). Auditors must check all the paper and inspect a sample of the farmers, mills and traders, and also whether the land where the feedstock for the ethanol is produced has been indeed farm land before and not a tropical forest or protected area. The certificates are to guarantee that all the biofuels sold under the label are sustainable and produced under the criteria set by the Renewable Energy Directive. Several private certification systems originally designed for sustainability more generally have adapted their standards to qualify for recognition under the Renewable Energy Directive, including the Roundtable on Sustainable Biomaterials and Bonsucro.

Environmental groups complained the measures "are too weak to halt a dramatic increase in deforestation." According to Greenpeace "Indirect land use change impacts of biofuels (ILUC) production still are not properly addressed" because if not properly regulated, "ILUC impacts will continue causing major biodiversity loss and more greenhosuse gas emissions." On the other hand, industry representatives welcomed the introduction of a certification system and some dismissed the concerns regarding the lack of criteria about ILUC.UNICA, the Brazilian ethanol producers association welcome the rules more cautiously, as they consider "that gaps in the rules needed to be filled in so the "industry has a clear framework within which to operate". Some other industry organizations also said that further clarification is needed in order to implement the Renewable Energy Directive.

The EC clarified that it would publish a report on the impacts of indirect land use by the end of 2010, as requested in the Renewable Energy Directive and on the basis of recently released reports that suggest that biofuels are saving greenhouse gas emissions.

==== Protecting untouched nature ====
The rules set by the Commission establish that biofuels should not be made from feedstocks from tropical forests or recently deforested areas, drained peatland, wetland or highly biodiverse areas. The corresponding Communication explains how this should be assessed and as an example, it makes it clear that the conversion of a forest to a palm oil plantation would not meet the sustainability requirements.

==== Promote only biofuels with high greenhouse gas savings ====
The Commission reiterated that Member States have to meet binding, national targets for renewable energy and that only those biofuels with high greenhouse gas emission savings count for the national targets. The corresponding Communication explains how to make the calculation, which not only includes carbon dioxide (CO_{2}), but also methane (CH_{4}) and nitrous oxide (N_{2}O), both stronger greenhouse gases than CO_{2}. Biofuels must deliver greenhouse gas savings of at least 35% compared to fossil fuels, rising to 50% in 2017 and to 60%, for biofuels from new plants, in 2018.

== See also ==
- California Air Resources Board
- Carbon emissions reporting
- Emission standard
- Emissions trading
- Global Warming Solutions Act of 2006
- Indirect land use change impacts of biofuels
- Low-carbon economy
- Renewable transport fuel obligation
- Sustainable transport
- Zero emissions vehicle
