= DDG =

DDG may refer to:

- IATA code for Dandong Langtou Airport, China
- Danish demining group
- DuckDuckGo, an internet search engine
- Duck, duck, goose, a traditional children's game
- Dried distillers' grain, a cereal byproduct of the distillation process
- Hull classification symbol for NATO guided-missile destroyers
- Drop Dead, Gorgeous, a post-hardcore band
- DDG (rapper) (born 1997), stage name of American musician Darryl Granberry Jr.
- David de Gea (born 1990), Spanish goalkeeper
- DDG Hansa, Deutsche Dampfschiffahrts-Gesellschaft Hansa, German Steamship Company Hansa
- ddg, the ISO 639-3 code for the Fataluku language
