= Renewable Fuels Agency =

Non-departmental public body

The Renewable Fuels Agency (RFA) was a UK Government non-departmental public body, created by the Department for Transport to implement the Renewable Transport Fuel Obligation or RTFO. The Agency ceased to exist at midnight on 31 March 2011 The Renewable Fuels Agency (RFA) was the UK's independent sustainable fuels regulator. The agency awards Renewable Transport Fuel Certificates (RTFCs) to suppliers of biofuels in the UK, ensures companies meet their annual obligations and runs the RTFO's carbon and sustainability reporting system.

== Function ==
The key stated aim of the UK Government in introducing the RTFO was to reduce carbon emissions. Under the RTFO, the RFA asks fuel suppliers to report on the specific type and origin of biofuels, the compliance of biofuel crops with existing environmental and social sustainability criteria and the greenhouse gas emissions reductions achieved by using biofuels (based on an analysis of direct lifecycle contributions of crops to greenhouse gas emissions).

The RFA was responsible for publishing updates on the progress of the RTFO, including progress on achieving compliance with sustainability criteria, on a monthly basis, as well as quarterly reports to the Department for Transport and annual reports to parliament.

The agency allocated Renewable Transport Fuel Certificates (RTFCs) to suppliers of biofuels in the UK, ensuring that obligated companies met their annual obligation, and ran the RTFO's world leading carbon and sustainability reporting system.

== RFA reporting ==
Suppliers of biofuels in the UK wishing to claim RTFCs must report to the RFA through the online ‘RFA Operating System (ROS)' the volume of biofuel they supply, and its carbon and sustainability characteristics. The RFA ensures that the data is verifiable and robust, and has a continual program of testing and reviewing its systems to ensure that they are resilient to the possibility of fraud.

To make a positive contribution to a low carbon future, biofuels must be sustainable. The reports published by the RFA on the carbon and sustainability of biofuel supplied in the UK are the first of their kind in the world. The Agency reports every month on the biofuels supplied in the UK, every quarter on the performance of individual suppliers and every year on the wider impacts of the RTFO.

On 28 January 2010, the RFA published Year One of the RTFO, the first Annual Report to Parliament on the impacts of the RTFO. The report includes verified data comparing the carbon and sustainability performance of individual fuel suppliers. This is the first time that data of this sort has been published anywhere in the world.

To assist suppliers in their reporting, the RFA provides a ‘Carbon calculator' to determine the lifecycle emissions from their fuels. The Agency benchmarks feedstock sustainability schemes against the RTFO 'Meta-Standard' for biofuel sustainability.

== RFA on carbon and sustainability ==
In order to understand the impacts of the RTFO, the RFA undertakes and commissions research. These research projects consider one or more of the impact areas outlined in the RTFO order, which are: carbon emissions, agriculture, sustainable development, other economic impacts and the environment generally. Results of the research are communicated through the Agency's regular stakeholder events, through their web site and at appropriate conferences.

The agency also engages with standards bodies and other stakeholders to promote biofuel sustainability and the systems and mechanisms which support this.

=== Gallagher Review ===
In July 2008 the RFA published the 'Gallagher Review' into the indirect effects of biofuels production. The report was commissioned by the Secretary of State for Transport in response to growing concern about the impact of rising global demands for biofuels on food prices, biodiversity and greenhouse gas emissions. A growing body of academic research suggested that biofuels would effectively displace agricultural production and cause damaging land-use change in other parts of the world. This led to calls for a moratorium on biofuels policies, particularly from NGOs, whilst the agricultural and biofuels sectors questioned the conclusions of the research and modelling. Governments and policy makers in the EU and elsewhere were trying to make sense of this new evidence at a time when many had recently introduced policies to support renewable fuels to tackle global warming and growing concerns about fuel security. In the EU the Renewable Energy Directive (RED), with ambitious proposals for renewable energy targets, was in the final stages of negotiation.

==== Gallagher Review conclusions ====
The review concluded that projected increased global demand for biofuels did carry significant risks that required urgent mitigation. It found that, whilst there was probably sufficient land for food, feed and biofuels, current policies did not ensure that additional production occurred in appropriate areas. As a result, the displacement of existing agricultural production was likely to lead to reductions in biodiversity and possibly increases in overall greenhouse gas emissions. It also found that biofuels would contribute to rising prices for some commodities that would adversely affect the poorest, but that the scale of these effects was complex and uncertain to model. On the basis of evidence gathered, the Gallagher Review concluded that a slowdown in targets was needed whilst appropriate mitigation measures were put in place.

== Legislation ==
The two pieces of legislation that relate directly to this public body and the Government policy it implements are the Energy Act 2004 and the Renewable Transport Fuel Obligation Order 2007.

== Structure of the RFA ==
The RFA was a small organisation, led by an independent board with six members including the chief executive. The agency had an annual budget of about £1.5 million and was based on the south coast of England in St Leonards-on-Sea.

== Closure ==
The Agency confirmed its closure in 2011 following the UK Government's review of non-departmental public bodies.
