= Hydrotreated vegetable oil =

Type of biofuel

Hydrotreated vegetable oil (HVO) is a biofuel made by the hydrocracking or hydrogenation of vegetable oil or animal fat. Hydrocracking breaks big molecules into smaller ones using hydrogen while hydrogenation eliminates double bonds by adding hydrogen to the molecules. These methods can be used to create substitutes for gasoline, diesel, propane, kerosene and other chemical feedstock including bio-derived fuel gas for use as either a fuel or a feedstock for green hydrogen production. Diesel fuel produced from these sources is sometimes referred to as green diesel or renewable diesel.

Diesel fuel created by hydrotreating is distinct from the biodiesel made through esterification.

== Feedstock ==
The majority of plant and animal oils are triglycerides, suitable for refining. Refinery feedstock includes "tall oil, [...] sludge palm oil, used cooking oil [yellow grease], microbial oils, algae oils, oils originating from yeast or mold products, oils originating from biomass, rapeseed oil, canola oil, colza oil, sunflower oil, soybean oil, hemp oil, olive oil, linseed oil, cottonseed oil, mustard oil, palm oil, arachis oil, castor oil, coconut oil, carinata oil, animal fats such as suet, tallow, blubber, recycled alimentary fats, starting materials produced by genetic engineering, insect oil and biological starting materials produced by microbes such as algae and bacteria".

One type of algae, Botryococcus braunii produces a different type of oil, known as a triterpene, which is transformed into alkanes by a different process.

Insect oil is being investigated as a feedstock for the production of hydrotreated vegetable oil. This oil is extracted from insect larvae, particularly those of the black soldier fly (Hermetia illucens), typically following a preliminary drying step. The recovered lipid is then subjected to a catalytic hydrogenation process to produce a paraffinic fuel with properties similar to those of fossil diesel.

Animal fats are also used as feedstocks for the production of hydrotreated vegetable oil. These fats can be extracted through three main industrial methods: dry rendering, wet rendering, and low temperature wet rendering. The low temperature wet rendering process, which involves liquefying the fat at or below 100 °C (212 °F), yields animal fat that is better suited for biofuel production. By limiting thermal degradation, this process reduces the formation of nitrogen containing compounds such as amides, amines, and ammonia, which are typically more abundant in fats produced via dry rendering. These nitrogenous compounds are considered undesirable because they can poison the catalysts employed during the hydrotreatment stage of biofuel synthesis.

The feedstock used for hydrotreatment may also comprise esters obtained from the transesterification of fatty acid esters or the esterification of fatty acids present in vegetable oils and animal fats.

== Chemical analysis ==
=== Synthesis ===
The production of hydrotreated vegetable oils is based on introducing hydrogen molecules into the raw fat or oil molecule. This process is associated with the reduction of the carbon compound. When hydrogen is used to react with triglycerides, different types of reactions can occur, and different resultant products are combined. The second step of the process involves converting the triglycerides/fatty acids to hydrocarbons by hydrodeoxygenation (removing oxygen as water) and/or decarboxylation (removing oxygen as carbon dioxide).

A formulaic example of this is C_{3}H_{5}(RCOO)_{3} + 12 H_{2} ⟶ C_{3}H_{8} + 3 RCH_{3} + 6 H_{2}O

=== Chemical composition ===
The chemical formula for HVO Diesel is C_{n}H_{2n+2}

=== Chemical properties ===
Hydrotreated oils are characterized by very good low temperature properties. The cloud point also occurs below −40 °C (−40 °F). Therefore, these fuels are suitable for the preparation of premium fuel with a high cetane number and excellent low temperature properties. The cold filter plugging point (CFPP) virtually corresponds to the cloud point value, which is why the value of the cloud point is significant in the case of hydrotreated oils.

== Comparison to biodiesel ==
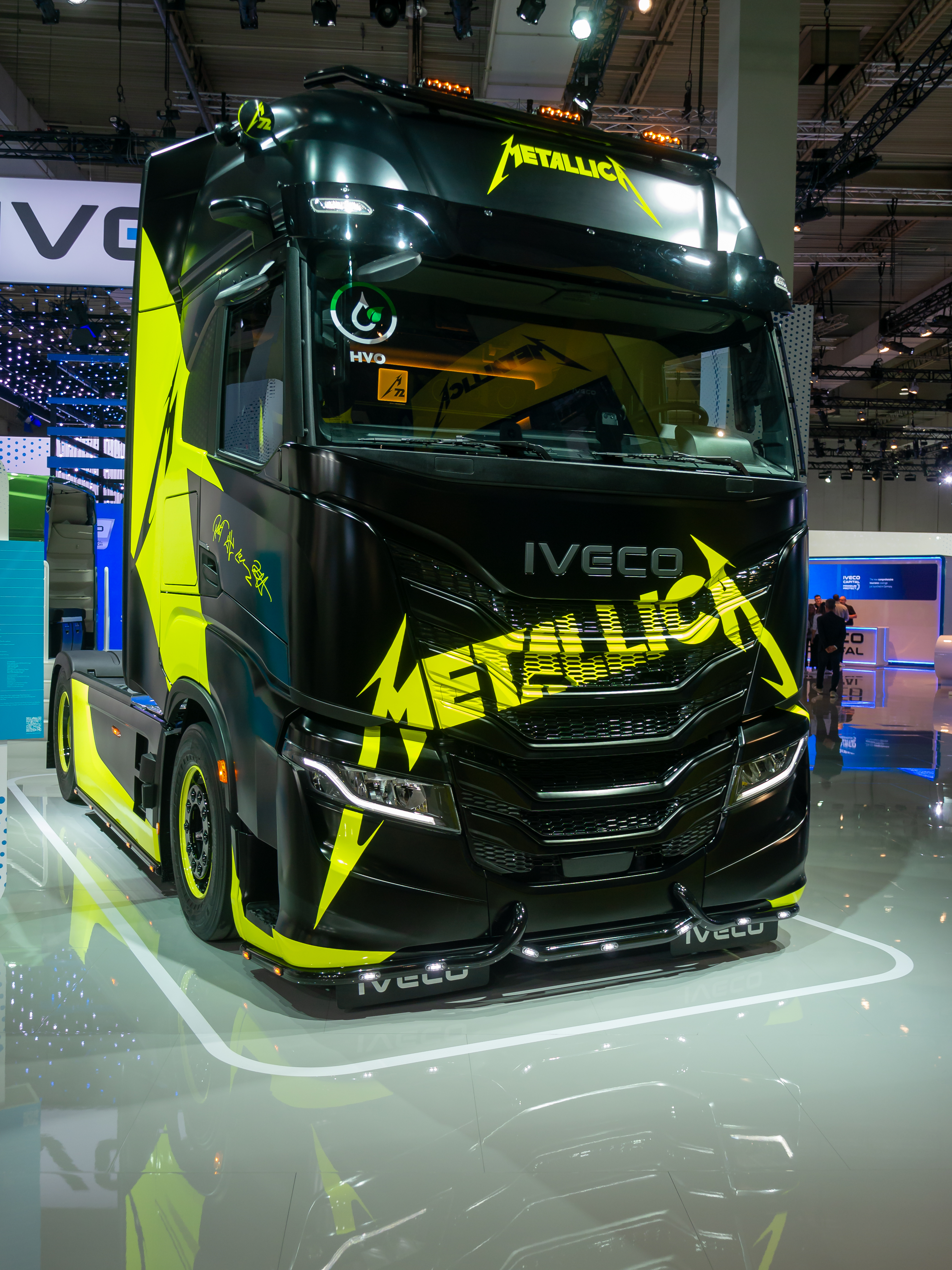
Semi-trailer tractor adapted for HVO

Both HVO diesel (green diesel) and biodiesel are made from the same feedstock such as vegetable oil or animal fat. However the processing technologies and chemical makeup of the two fuels differ. The chemical reaction commonly used to produce biodiesel is known as transesterification.

The production of biodiesel also makes glycerol, but the production of HVO does not.

Neste has published the differences between biodiesel and renewable diesel (HVO) which are summarized in the table below.

	NESTE MY Renewable Diesel	Conventional ULSD	Biodiesel B20
GHG Emissions Reduction	Up to 75%	None	15%
Renewable Source	100%	No	Yes
Performance in Cold Weather	Excellent	Excellent	Depends
Cetane Number	70+	45-55	50
Fuel Stability	High	Average	Low
OEM Approval	Yes	Yes	Yes

== Commercialization ==
Various stages of converting renewable hydrocarbon fuels produced by hydrotreating is done throughout energy industry. Some commercial examples of vegetable oil refining are:

- Repsol NEXA 100% renovable
- Neste NExBTL
- Topsoe HydroFlex technology
- Axens Vegan technology
- H-Bio, the ConocoPhilips process
- UOP/Eni Ecofining process.
- EcoCeres hydroprocessed Esters and Fatty Acids (HEFA)

Neste is the largest manufacturer, producing ca. 3.3 million tonnes annually (2023). Neste completed their first NExBTL plant in the summer 2007 and the second one in 2009. Petrobras planned to use 256 megalitres (1,610,000 bbl) of vegetable oils in the production of H-Bio fuel in 2007. ConocoPhilips is processing 42,000 US gallons per day (1,000 bbl/d) of vegetable oil. Other companies working on the commercialization and industrialization of renewable hydrocarbons and biofuels include Neste, REG Synthetic Fuels, LLC, ENI, UPM Biofuels, Diamond Green Diesel partnered with countries across the globe. Manufacturers of these renewable diesels report greenhouse gas emissions reductions of 60-95% compared to fossil diesel, as well as better cold-flow properties to work in colder climates. In addition, all of these green diesels can be introduced into any diesel engine or infrastructure without many mechanical modifications at any ratio with petroleum-based diesels.

Renewable diesel from vegetable oil is a growing substitute for petroleum. California fleets used over 200 million US gallons (760,000 m^{3}) of renewable diesel in 2017. The California Air Resources Board predicts that over 2 billion US gallons (7,600,000 m^{3}) of fuel will be consumed in the state under its Low Carbon Fuel Standard requirements in the next ten years. Fleets operating on Renewable Diesel from various refiners and feedstocks are reported to see lower emissions, reduced maintenance costs, and nearly identical experience when driving with this fuel.

== Sustainability concerns ==
A number of issues have been raised about the sustainability of HVO, primarily concerning the sourcing of its lipid feedstocks. Waste oils such as used cooking oil are a limited resource and their use cannot be scaled up beyond a certain point. Moreover, the vast majority of the raw material UCO (Used Cooking Oil) is already collected and utilized in a series of thermal and chemical processes to reduce the GHG footprint Taking the UCO from there and replacing it by fossil oil may not lead to a reduction of the GHG footprint.

Further demand for HVO would have to be met with crop-based virgin vegetable oils, but the diversion of vegetable oils from the food market into the biofuels sector has been linked to increased global food prices, and to global agricultural expansion and intensification. This is associated with a variety of ecological and environmental implications; moreover, greenhouse gas emissions from land use change may in some circumstances negate or exceed any benefit from the displacement of fossil fuels.

A 2022 study published by the International Council on Clean Transportation found that the anticipated scale-up of renewable diesel capacity in the U.S. would quickly exhaust the available supply of waste and residual oils, and increasingly rely on domestic and imported soy oil. The report also noted that increased U.S. renewable diesel production risked indirectly driving the expansion of palm oil cultivation in Southeast Asia, where the palm oil industry is still endemically associated with deforestation and peat destruction.

== Challenges in Producing Fuels from Bio-Derived Feedstocks with HVO ==
Refinery hydrotreaters are used for processing HVO. Introducing even minor amounts of biomaterial into a diesel hydrotreater has implications and potential risk factors. The main issues are corrosion, high hydrogen consumption, and catalyst deactivation.

According to Haldor Topsoe's experience with their licensed units, HVO production poses certain challenges for hydrotreaters including:

Corrosion - There are several corrosion mechanisms from hydrotreating vegetable oils and animal fats. Most are acidic though this is tempered by being bound into tri and di-glycerides. However, difficult feedstocks like Distillers Corn Oil can contain 10-15% free fatty acids. These acids can attack non-stainless steels in the preheat train, fired heater, piping, valves and reactors. In addition, chlorides that contaminate feeds can be converted to hydrogen chloride in the reactor which can then cause accelerated corrosion in the effluent lines and for sour water. The presence of chlorides in a wet environment is also problematic for the common stainless steel grades 304 and 316 due to the potential of intergranular stress chloride cracking. In addition, the formation of carbon dioxide from decarboxylation reactions during hydrotreating can form carbonic acid when contacted with water.

Hydrogen Consumption - removing oxygen, cracking long-chain molecules, and saturating olefinic bonds will chemically consume two to four times the hydrogen of a conventional ULSD hydrotreater. ULSD hydrotreating chemical hydrogen consumption is typically 300-600 scf/bbl of feed depending on the aromatic saturation required for cycle oils and other cracked feedstocks. Chemical consumption for HVO approaches 2,500 scf/bbl depending on the level of saturation of feedstock and the length of the carbon chains. Delivering hydrogen for consumption, in addition to quench and additional excess circulating hydrogen can pose significant challenges to unit revamp design and operation with hydraulics, distribution, and compressor power being critical.

Fouling - alkali metals and especially phosphorus must be kept low in HVO feedstocks in order to minimize pressure drop from fouling and general catalyst deactivation. Phosphatidic glassing is an aggressive catalyst poisoning mechanism that will not only plug off a reactor's pore spaces thus causing rapid pressure drop, but will also interfere with the catalysts acid sites by coating the outside of the catalyst and begin adhering to other catalyst particles.

== Operational history ==
HVO processing is a young technology relative to most other refining processes. The first commercial scale HVO unit in the United States started up in Louisiana in 2010 with a capacity of 100 million US gallons (380,000 m^{3}) per year.

A newbuild plant was constructed in 2010 Geismar, LA by the Syntroleum Corporation and its joint-venture partner Tyson Foods. The plant initiated startup in the 3rd quarter with a target of 75 million US gallons (280,000 m^{3}) per year. Feedstock for the plant was vegetable oil and pretreated rendered poultry fat. The site achieved 87% of its design capacity in 2011. Corrosion, including chloride-linked stress corrosion cracking shut the plant down in 2012 for more than a year. Tyson sold its 50% ownership to Renewable Energy Group (now Chevron) and Syntroleum's stock was announced by the same buyer in 2013 with closing in 2014. In 2015, two fires caused damage to the plant with major damage being incurred.

== Operable capacity ==
=== United States ===
Company	City	State	Capacity in Million Gallons/yr	000s bpd equivalent
Diamond Green Diesel LLC	Norco	Louisiana	982	30.7
Diamond Green Diesel LLC	Port Arthur	Texas	470	12.5
Dakota Prairie	Dickinson	North Dakota	192	8.8
Calumet	Calumet	Montana	135	8.2
HollyFrontier	Artesia	New Mexico	125	7.8
Phillips 66 Rodeo	Rodeo	California	120	7.7
HollyFrontier	Sinclair	Wyoming	117	7.6
Chevron/REG	Geismar	Louisiana	100	6.5
CVR	Wynnewood	Oklahoma	100	6.5
HollyFrontier	Cheyenne	Wyoming	92	6.0
Seaboard Energy	Hugoton	Kansas	85	5.5

=== Canada ===
Company	City	Province	Capacity in Million Gallons/yr	000s bpd equivalent
Braya Renewable Fuels	Come By Chance	Newfoundland	275	18.0

== See also ==
- Biodiesel
- Indirect land use change impacts of biofuels
- Algae fuel
- Renewable hydrocarbon fuels via decarboxylation/decarbonylation
- Sustainable oils
- Vegetable oil fuel
