= Decarboxylated and decarbonylated biofuels =

Decarboxylated and decarbonylated biofuels are renewable hydrocarbon fuels produced by converting biomass, by either decarboxylation or decarbonylation, into liquid transportation fuels, such as ethanol and biodiesel. Conversion of biomass to liquid fuels is preferred as an alternative to the extraction of fossil fuels because biomass removes carbon dioxide from the atmosphere as it grows through photosynthesis. When combusted, this carbon is re-released into the atmosphere, closing the carbon cycle and making biofuels carbon neutral under some conditions. First generation biofuels such as biodiesel are produced directly from crops, such as cereals, maize, sugar beet and cane, and rapeseed. Second generation fuels are produced from byproducts from production of food and other goods, as well as from household waste, used frying oil from restaurants, and slaughterhouse waste.

== History ==
Studies of decarboxylation over nickel and palladium-based catalysts were first reported by Wilhelm Maier et al., in 1982, when they achieved the deoxygenation of several carboxylic acids via decarboxylation under a hydrogen atmosphere. This included the conversion of aliphatic acids (such as heptanoic and octanoic acids) to alkanes (namely hexane and heptane), a reaction in which palladium catalysts produced the best results. This reaction can be written as:

RCO_{2}H → RH + CO_{2}

In 2006, Dmitry Murzin filed a patent with Neste Oyj for the manufacture of hydrocarbons in the diesel fuel range from renewable raw materials, with decreased consumption of hydrogen resulting from using Group VIII metals. Since then, a number of researchers have also started working on the deoxygenation of lipid-based materials to fuel-like hydrocarbons via decarboxylation and decarbonylation as an alternative to hydrodeoxygenation, the reaction most commonly employed to convert lipids to hydrocarbons.

== Process ==
Decarboxylation and decarbonylation, collectively referred to as deCO_{x} reactions, accomplish the goal of eliminating oxygen by removing it in the form of carbon dioxide or carbon monoxide. These processes show several distinct advantages over hydrodeoxygenation (HDO). Because deCO_{x} does not require high hydrogen pressures, it has the potential to be performed at smaller decentralized facilities that can be placed closer to biomass sources, reducing economic and environmental costs associated with the transportation of materials and products between these facilities. While deCO_{x} reactions require the loss of a small amount of carbon, the lower hydrogen pressure requirement compensates for the slightly lower carbon efficiency relative to HDO.

== Components ==
=== Catalysts ===
The catalysts utilized in deCO_{x} reactions generally pose fewer problems than those currently used in hydrodeoxygenation. Research is still ongoing in investigating different catalysts for their characteristics in favoring and facilitating deCO_{x} reaction pathways. Numerous catalysts have been analyzed for their efficiency, as determined by the rate and yield of lipid conversion, as well as the degree of selectivity towards diesel fuel-range hydrocarbons. Supported metal catalysts have been found to be a promising class of catalysts for fuel production, with the supports most commonly used being oxides or carbon materials. These supports stabilize the metals as small particles, resulting in a larger total metal surface area and increasing the number of active sites available to catalyze the reaction. Carbon supports indicated a higher level of activity when compared to the other supports. However, given that the main deactivation mechanism for these catalysts is the occlusion of active sites by carbon deposits on the catalyst surface, and the spent catalyst regeneration method preferred in industry is the combustion of these carbon deposits by calcination in hot air, the use of carbon supports is rendered impractical, as this regeneration method would effectively destroy the catalyst. This makes the use of oxide supported catalysts of particular interest, as they are more resistant to calcination. Alternatives for restoring catalyst function, such as through the use of a series of solvent washes, may leave carbon supports intact, but are still less preferred than calcination.

Many of the catalysts under study use precious metals such as palladium (Pd) or platinum (Pt). Although these Pd- or Pt-based catalysts afford excellent yields of fuel-like hydrocarbons, the cost of these metals may prove prohibitive for large-scale use. Research focusing on the use of inexpensive nickel-based catalysts has increased as a result. While Pd- and Pt-based catalysts are intrinsically more active in deCO_{x} reactions, increasing the metal loading in Ni-based catalysts can afford comparable results. The latter is both feasible and cost-effective, since nickel is significantly cheaper than palladium and platinum.

These metal catalysts often tend towards deactivation and display poor reusability characteristics. This has been attributed to a variety of causes, including metal oxidation, metal loss due to leaching or sintering, and a decrease in surface area as a result of pore occlusion. Metal leaching and oxidation are observed far less often in catalysts composed of palladium. Catalyst poisoning can generally be attributed to the CO_{x} that forms over the duration of a deCO_{x} reaction, as well as to sulfur and phosphorus impurities in the reaction inputs. An additional cause of deactivation is the adsorbing aromatic compounds to the catalysts, where these compounds are found in the reaction inputs or are produced over the course of a reaction. However, the primary cause of catalyst deactivation is surface area loss due to pore occlusion by deposits on the catalyst surface.

=== Feeds ===
Another consideration in the production of biofuels is the origin of the biomass materials. In creating an alternative fuel source, it is important that the feed, or reaction input, does not overburden the food supply or arable land. Recent focus has been on the use of inedible lipid-based stocks, including brown grease, yellow grease, and algal oil, which place smaller burdens on agricultural production. These feeds have the additional advantage of tending towards being highly saturated, which means that they are closer in composition to the hydrocarbon fuel end product and require lower pressures of hydrogen for deoxygenation reactions. Both unsaturated and saturated feeds can processed by deCO_{x}, but unsaturated feeds often present more problems. They tend to exacerbate catalyst deactivation and result in lower hydrocarbon yields.

=== Reactor system and conditions ===
Three reactor types have been used to study deCO_{x} reactions: semi-batch, batch, and continuous types. Semi-batch and continuous mode reactors have the benefit of purging CO_{x} formed throughout the duration of a reaction, which would otherwise lead to catalyst deactivation. Continuous mode reactors parallel existing processes used in industry settings and are more amenable to producing large quantities of product at a constant rate. The types of gases used in deCO_{x} studies include pure hydrogen, inert gases, and mixtures of the two. Though the use of hydrogen is not strictly necessary in these reactions, it does facilitate the production of higher yields of hydrocarbon products. However, with Ni-based catalysts there is a limit to this effect; if the partial pressure of hydrogen is too high, it will decrease the yield of desired products. The rate at which the reaction occurs is highly dependent upon the reaction conditions and the catalyst utilized. Though it is known that deoxygenation via deCO_{x} generally proceeds at a higher rate with increased temperatures, undesired side reactions also increase in rate, which could lead to catalyst deactivation. The reaction route does not appear to be dependent on the type of solvents utilized. However, the nature of the solvent can influence the activity of the catalyst. Solvents with low boiling points appear to lead to an increase in catalytic activity.

== Third generation biofuels ==
Research is currently underway to produce third generation biofuels, which are obtained from ultra-high yield biomass such as algae, via decarboxylation/decarbonylation, an alternative process offering a number of important advantages over hydrodeoxygenation.

== See also ==
- Algae fuel
- Biodiesel production
- Hydrotreated vegetable oil
