= UNICA, Brazil =

UNICA (Portuguese: União da Indústria de Cana-de-Açúcar), the Brazilian Sugarcane Industry Association, is an organization of producers of sugarcane and ethanol fuel. UNICA members are responsible for more than 50% of all ethanol produced in Brazil and 60% of overall sugar production.

UNICA's headquarters are located in the city of São Paulo, Brazil, and also has offices in Washington, D.C., and Brussels.

== History ==
The Brazilian Sugarcane Industry Association (UNICA) is the largest organization in Brazil representing sugar, ethanol and bioelectricity producers. It was created in 1997, following a consolidation process involving regional organizations in the State of São Paulo after government deregulation of the sugar and ethanol sectors. UNICA members answer for more than 50% of all ethanol produced in Brazil and 60% of overall sugar production.

The organization is run by a board of directors composed of representatives of its member companies, and a full-time group of experienced executives, specialists and technical consultants whose expertise covers relevant areas such as the environment, technology, energy, international trade, corporate social responsibility, legislation, economics and communications. In late 2007, UNICA launched its first international office in Washington D.C. That was followed by the opening of its European office in Brussels.

UNICA's expanding foreign presence is an integral part of its strategy to provide consumers, government officials, NGOs, the business community and the news media with up-to-date, detailed information on vital social, economic and environmental contributions of Brazil's sugar, ethanol and bioelectricity sectors.

== Mission ==
UNICA's mission is to play a leading role in the consolidation of the Brazilian sugarcane industry as a modern agroindustrial complex equipped to compete sustainably, in Brazil and around the world, as suppliers of ethanol, sugar and bioelectricity.

== Priorities ==
- Consolidate ethanol as a globally traded commodity
- Promote demand of ethanol as a clean, renewable transport fuel
- Expand use of ethanol to other relevant sectors
- Foment large-scale production of bioelectricity for Brazil's domestic market
- Assist member companies in becoming sustainability benchmarks
- Disseminate solid, credible scientific data about the competitiveness and sustainability of sugarcane ethanol

== Key Strategies ==
- Support best practices in the sugarcane industry, in a competitive, free market environment
- Promote the global expansion of ethanol production and use
- Encourage the continuous advancement of sustainability throughout the sugarcane industry
- Play a leading role in negotiations to eliminate trade-distorting barriers against sugar and ethanol
- Promote bioelectricity as a reliable alternative to fossil fuels
- Support research into new technologies and uses for ethanol, particularly biorefineries
- Become a global reference for solid, reliable analysis and data about the sugarcane industry

== See also ==
- Cosan
- Ethanol fuel in Brazil
- Renewable Fuels Association
