= Renewable Transport Fuel Obligation =

UK requirement on fuel suppliers

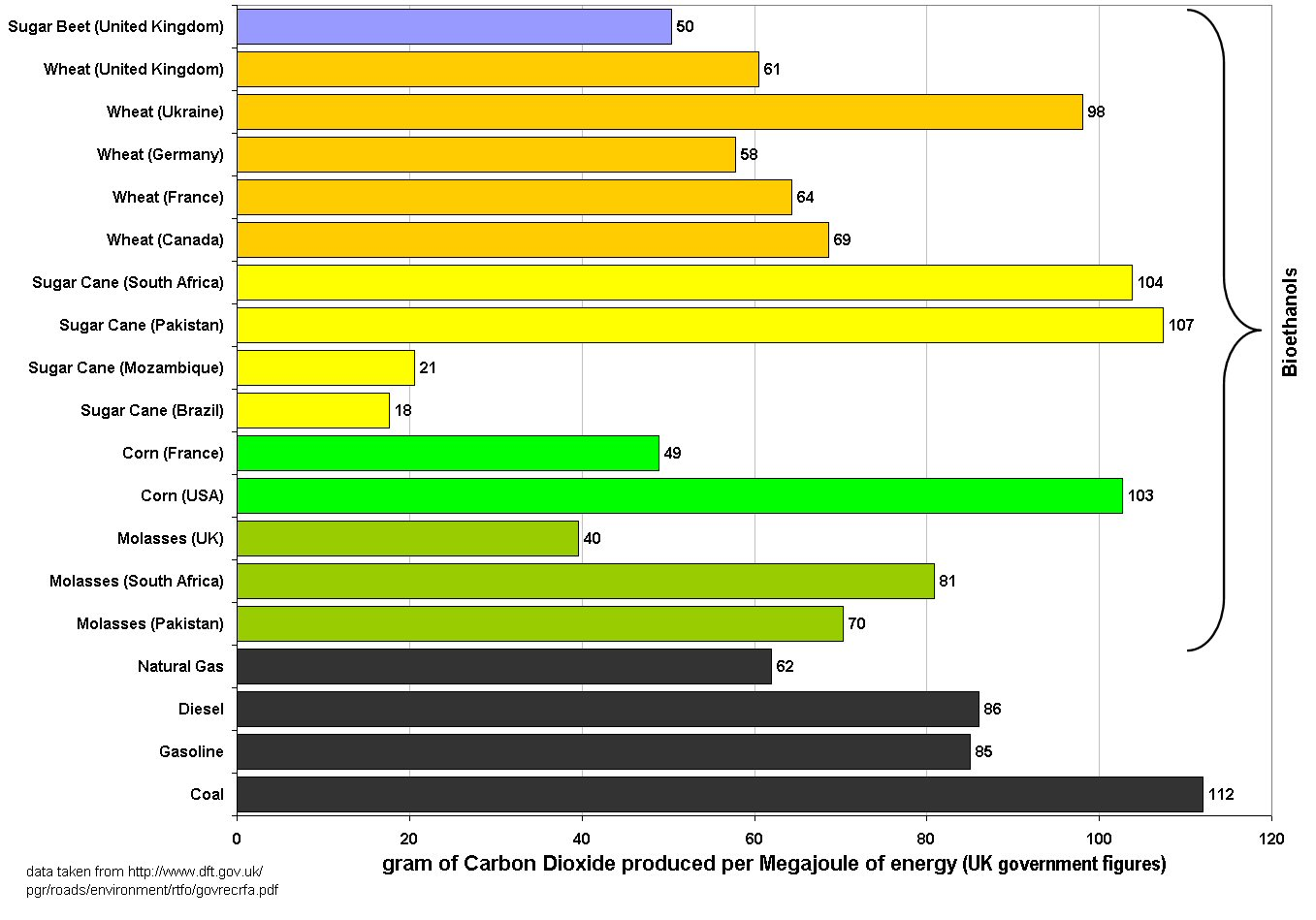
UK figures for the carbon intensity of bioethanol and fossil fuels. This graph assumes that all bioethanols are burnt in their country of origin and that previously existing cropland is used to grow the feedstock. No indirect land use changes are included.

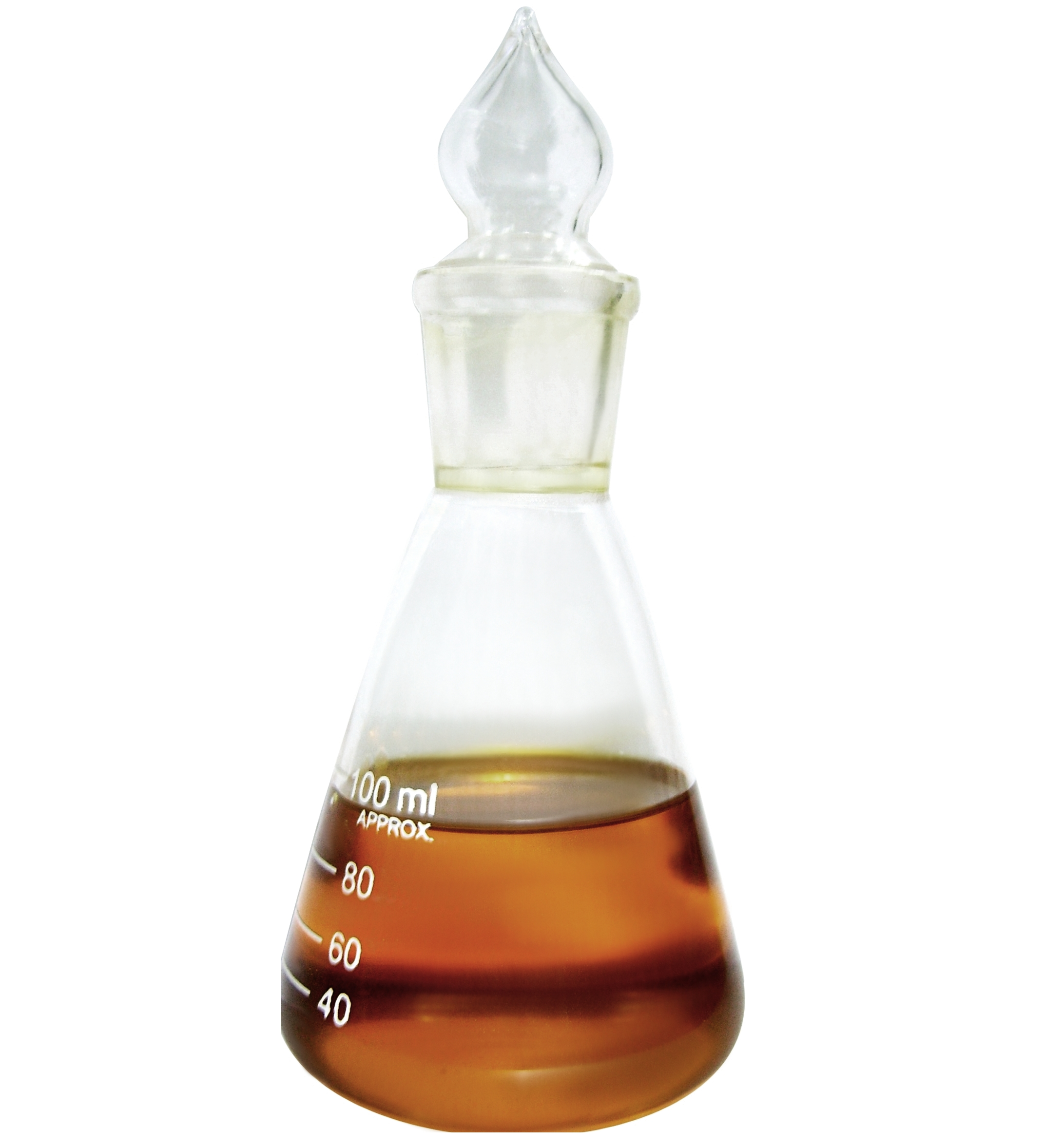
Biodiesel sample

The Renewable Transport Fuel Obligation (RTFO) in the United Kingdom is a requirement on transport fuel suppliers to ensure that 5 percent of all road vehicle fuel is supplied from sustainable renewable sources by 2010. The Government intends to set variable targets for the level of carbon and sustainability performance expected from all transport fuel suppliers claiming certificates for biofuels in the early years of the RTFO.

The announcement to introduce the Obligation was made on 10 November 2005, using powers included in the Energy Act 2004. It came into force on 15 April 2008. In mid-2005, biofuel made up 0.25% of overall road fuel sales, around 50% of it imported.

In practice, the Renewable Transport Fuel Obligation will mostly be achieved by blending fossil fuels with bioethanol, biomethanol or biodiesel – derived from sources such as palm oil, oilseed rape, cereals, sugar cane, sugar beet, and reprocessed vegetable oil – or biomethane. Almost all existing vehicles are able to run on a 5% blend in liquid fuels, in some cases with fuel system adjustments. Natural gas vehicles can run on pure biomethane. Consideration should also be given to the effect of biofuel constituents on fuel system parts such as rubber hoses, particularly in older or classic vehicles. Flexible Fuel Vehicles, currently more common in the Americas than in Europe, are able to use blends of up to 85% ethanol in the U.S. and Canada, and up to 100% hydrous ethanol in Brazil.

The requirement that the biofuel sources should be sustainable is also important. In South America and Asia, the production of biofuels for export has in some cases resulted in significant ecological damage, including the clearing of rainforest.

In the future, the Department for Transport estimate that up to 1/3 of the fuel in the UK transport sector could be produced from home-grown biofuels. In addition to contributing to cutting carbon emissions, the use of biofuels is seen as widening the country's fuel diversity and increasing fuel security.

The RTFO will help bring the UK into line with European Union biofuels directive, which sets targets for all EU countries for biofuel usage of 2% by the end of 2005 and 5.75% by the end of 2010.

== Implementation ==
The RTFO will be implemented through a certification scheme administered by the Department for Transport. Companies certified as having sold more than the 5% obligation will be able to sell their certificates for the excess to those who sold less.

== See also ==
- Biodiesel in the United Kingdom
- Climate change
- Energy use and conservation in the United Kingdom
- Energy policy of the United Kingdom
- Hybrid vehicle
- Peak oil
- Low-carbon fuel standard
