= GREET Model =

R&D GREET (Research and Development Greenhouse gases, Regulated Emissions, and Energy use in Technologies) is a full life cycle model developed by the Argonne National Laboratory (U.S. Department of Energy's Office of Energy Efficiency and Renewable Energy). It fully evaluates energy and emission impacts of advanced and new transportation fuels, the fuel cycle from well to wheel and the vehicle cycle through material recovery and vehicle disposal. It allows researchers and analysts to evaluate various vehicle and fuel combinations on a full fuel-cycle/vehicle-cycle basis.

The GREET model is specified in the Inflation Reduction Act of 2022 §45V as the methodology to calculate the life cycle greenhouse gas emissions "through the point of production (well-to-gate)" when determining the level of tax credit for clean Hydrogen production until a successor is approved by the Secretary of the Treasury. The final 45V regulations determined 45VH2-GREET to be a “successor model” and required its use for the purposes of the 45V tax credit.

The original implementation of the model was made using Excel spreadsheets while a graphical version has also been made using .NET.

== Content ==
For a given vehicle and fuel system, R&D GREET separately calculates the following:

- Consumption of total energy (energy in non-renewable and renewable sources), fossil fuels (petroleum, fossil natural gas, and coal together), petroleum, coal and natural gas;
- Emissions of CO_{2}-equivalent greenhouse gases - primarily carbon dioxide (CO_{2}), methane (CH_{4}), and nitrous oxide (N_{2}O);
- Emissions of six criteria pollutants: volatile organic compounds (VOCs), carbon monoxide (CO), nitrogen oxide (NO_{x}), airborne particulate matter with sizes smaller than 10 micrometre (PM10]), particulate matter with sizes smaller than 2.5 micrometre (PM2.5), and sulfur oxides (SO_{x}).
- Water consumption

R&D GREET includes more than 100 fuel production pathways and more than 70 vehicle/fuel systems.
