= Growth Energy =

Growth Energy is an American trade association that represents ethanol producers. Growth Energy's mission is "the producers and supporters of ethanol, who feed the world and fuel America in ways that achieve energy independence, improve economic well-being, and create a healthier environment for all Americans now."

== Issues ==
=== Renewable Fuel Standard ===
Growth Energy supports the Renewable Fuel Standard. In a written statement, Tom Buis, co-chairman of the group, said, "The RFS is the only meaningful policy to help break Big Oil’s stranglehold on the liquid fuels marketplace. This is an energy policy that is working. It is doing exactly what it was intended to do, with great success. It is irresponsible to rely solely on fossil fuels, and we should not put all our eggs in one basket when it comes to our national and energy security. The bottom line is that ten years after the RFS, Americans across the country are celebrating and recognizing a decade of job creation, rural economic revitalization, clean air, innovation and increased energy independence and consumer choice."

=== Corporate Average Fuel Economy/Greenhouse Gas standards ===
Speaking of comments submitted by Growth Energy on a Technical Assessment Report on Corporate Average Fuel Economy/Greenhouse Gas (CAFE/GHG) standards, a spokesman said, “Our comments highlight the wealth of available research that outlines the vital role that affordable, higher blends of ethanol can play in helping automakers achieve increasing future GHG and CAFÉ standards. Furthermore, we encourage the agencies involved in this review to not only acknowledge the important role higher blends can play but ensure they are part of the larger goal in achieving greater efficiency and a reduction in harmful emissions."

=== Market access ===
Increasing consumer access to ethanol is a key issue for the organization. One of the ways Growth Energy does this is by increasing access to ethanol-gasoline blends with higher amounts of ethanol than the standard E10. The organization's "Prime the Pump" program encourages retailers to sell E15, containing about 15% ethanol. Their efforts face a number of challenges. First, many states, such as California, prohibit the sale of E15. Second, regulations on Reid vapor pressure often prohibit the sale of E15 to non-flexible fuel cars during the summer.

== Leadership ==
=== Emily Skor ===
Emily Skor became Growth Energy's CEO in 2016. Before joining Growth Energy, Skor was vice president for communications at vice president of communications at the Consumer Healthcare Products Association (CHPA). She also served as the CHPA Educational Foundation's executive director. Skor was born in Minnesota, where ethanol is an important industry. Skor replaced Tom Buis as CEO.

== Awards ==
Growth Energy presents an annual "Fueling Growth" award to members of the United States Congress. The group calls this award “highest honor given to congressional leaders who advocate for renewable fuels like ethanol and consumer choice at the pump.” The winner for 2016 was Senator Charles Grassley of Iowa.

== Assessment ==
Advocating for the US Renewable Fuel Standard has been one of the main aims of Growth Energy. The 2022 study "Environmental outcomes of the US Renewable Fuel Standard", published in PNAS, stated, "We find that the RFS increased corn prices by 30% and the prices of other crops by 20%, which, in turn, expanded US corn cultivation by 2.8 Mha (8.7%) and total cropland by 2.1 Mha (2.4%) in the years following policy enactment (2008 to 2016). These changes increased annual nationwide fertilizer use by 3 to 8%, increased water quality degradants by 3 to 5%, and caused enough domestic land use change emissions such that the carbon intensity of corn ethanol produced under the RFS is no less than gasoline and likely at least 24% higher."
