= Renewable Fuels Association =

Body representing the U.S. ethanol industry

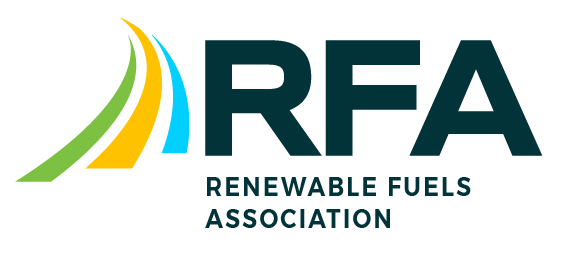
The official logo of the Renewable Fuels Association

The Renewable Fuels Association (RFA) represents the ethanol industry promoting policies, regulations, and research and development initiatives that will lead to the increased production and use of ethanol fuel. First organized in 1981, RFA serves as a voice of advocacy for the ethanol industry, providing research data and industry analysis to its members, to the public via the media, to the United States Congress, as well as to related federal and state agencies.

== Organization ==
RFA's chairman is Neil Koehler of Pacific Ethanol, Inc. and the vice-chairman is Jeanne McCaherty of Guardian Energy, LLC. The RFA has offices in both St. Louis, Missouri, and Washington, D.C.

=== Staff ===
==== Geoff Cooper ====
Geoff Cooper is RFA's president and CEO, a position he has held since October 2018. Previously he served as RFA Executive Vice President. In addition to overseeing market analysis and policy research, he provides regulatory support and strategic planning for the association and its members. Geoff also focuses on issues related to lifecycle analysis, sustainability and ethanol co-products. Prior to joining RFA, Geoff served as Director of Ethanol Programs for the National Corn Growers Association. In this role, he led research and promotional efforts to increase the production and use of corn-based ethanol. Previously, Geoff served as a captain in the U.S. Army, specializing in bulk petroleum supply and logistics. A Wyoming native, Geoff graduated from Drake University in Des Moines, Iowa. He earned his master's degree at Webster University in St. Louis.

== Issues ==
=== Renewable Volume Obligations (RVO) ===
The RFA argues that the Environmental Protection Agency (EPA) abused its waiver authority by setting RVOs lower than the statutory minimums. They say Congress clearly intended for the law to apply according to supply that could be available rather than demand. They contend that the EPA has conflated the two. Under the Energy Independence and Security Act of 2007 (EISA), the statutory standard for 2017 is 24 billion gallons. The EPA only set an RVO of 18.8 billion gallons of biofuel for 2017. This was up from 18.4 billion gallons in 2016. Ethanol supporters and oil companies alike criticized this target.

=== Green jobs ===
The RFA considers employment in the ethanol industry to be a primary example of "green jobs". The 2010 US Ethanol Industry Salary Survey determined that employees about 500,000 people with 75% of such workers making more than $50,000 per year and 99% receiving health benefits. The RFA points out that these jobs, heavily concentrated in rural areas, provide a much-needed economic boost to otherwise depressed places.

=== E85 ===
As of December 2014, almost half of new vehicles produced by Chrysler, Ford, and General Motors are flex-fuel, meaning roughly one-quarter of all new vehicles sold by 2015 are capable of using up to E85. However, obstacles to widespread use of E85 fuel remain. A 2014 analysis by the Renewable Fuels Association found that oil companies prevent or discourage affiliated retailers from selling E85 through rigid franchise and branding agreements, restrictive supply contracts, and other tactics. The report showed independent retailers are five times more likely to offer E85 than retailers carrying an oil company brand.

== Committees ==
The RFA convenes four concern-specific committees.

- Technical Committee

focuses heavily on fuel specifications and standards such as ASTM International, National Conference of Weights and Measures, ISO, Canadian General Standards Board, and other international fuel requirements.

- Environmental Compliance Committee

examines and provides guidance on the myriad of environmental regulations pertaining to ethanol production facilities.

- Co-Products Committee

focuses on issues relevant to all ethanol co-products, from research and educational programs to regulatory issues and trade.

- Plant and Employee Safety Committee

works with federal, state and local governments as well as industry partners, to bring attention to hazardous materials regulations and other safety requirements.

== See also ==
- Renewable Fuel Standard
- Canadian Renewable Fuels Association
- Renewable energy commercialization in the United States
- Solar Energy Industries Association
- Renewable energy commercialization
- American Council on Renewable Energy
- National Renewable Energy Laboratory
