= Distillers grains =

Byproduct from the distillation of cereals

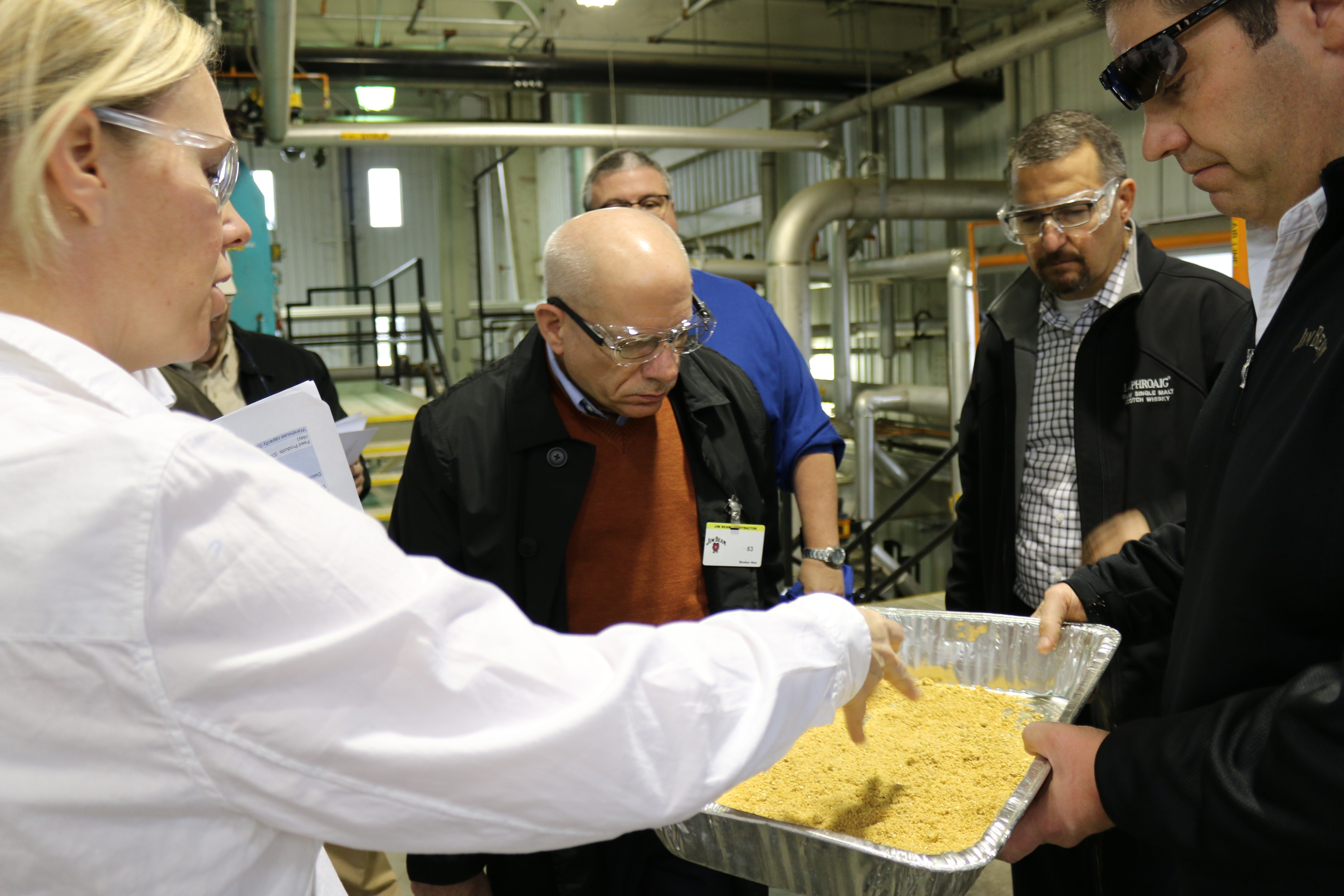
People examine a tray of spent grains at a distillery.

Distillers grains are a cereal byproduct of the distillation process. Brewer's spent grain usually refers to barley produced as a byproduct of brewing, while distillers grains are a mix of wheat, maize, rice and other grains.

There are two main sources of these grains. The traditional sources were from brewers. More recently, ethanol biofuel plants are a growing source. It is created in distilleries by drying mash, and is subsequently sold for a variety of purposes, usually as fodder for livestock (especially ruminants). Maize-based distillers grains from the ethanol industry are commonly sold as a high protein livestock feed that increases efficiency and lowers the risk of subacute acidosis in beef cattle.

Recently, studies indicate that dried distillers grains with solubles (DDGS) as a food source for human consumption may have some benefit in reducing heart disease risk. The mash left over from the process contains nutrients, such as protein, fiber, germ, vitamins, and minerals, and research suggests that the flour made from DDG will work well with cookies and flatbread. The texture and taste of food-grade DDG, especially maize, has been compared to breakfast cereal.

== Wet and dry distillers grains ==
There are two common types of distillers grains:

- Wet distillers grains (WDG) contain primarily unfermented grain residues (protein, fibre, fat and up to 70% moisture). WDG has a shelf life of four to five days. Due to the water content, WDG transport is usually economically viable within 200 km of the ethanol production facility.
- Dried distillers grains with solubles (DDGS) is WDG that has been dried with the concentrated thin stillage to 10–12% moisture. DDGS have an almost indefinite shelf life and may be shipped to any market regardless of its proximity to an ethanol plant. Drying is costly, as it requires further energy input. In the US, it is packaged and traded as a commodity product.veer

== Production ==
In beer or whiskey production, grains of corn (including wheat and maize), are put through a mashing process, where grain is ground and added to hot water. The starch in the grains undergoes saccharification by enzymes, turning the starch into sugars that are released into the water. The water is removed from the grain, and becomes wort for brewing. The remaining grain, called "spent grain" for the removal of simple sugars and starch, can then be sold as a by-product.

The conversion rate of grains to ethanol and distillers grains varies with the different types of grains and the process used. The details are outlined below:

- The conversion rate of maize to distillers grains is: One tonne of maize produces 378 L of ethanol and 479 kg WDG (70% moisture content), or 309 kg of DDGS (10% moisture content).
- The conversion rate of wheat to distillers grains is: One tonne of wheat produces 372 L of ethanol and 457 kg WDG (70% moisture content), or 295 kg of DDGS (10% moisture content).

== See also ==
- Dietary fiber
- Sake kasu
