= Ethanol fuel in Hawaii =

Ethanol is not presently manufactured in Hawaii. Between April 2, 2006, and June 26, 2015, Hawaii State law (Hawaii Revised Statutes Chapter 486J-10 and Hawaii Administrative Rules Chapter 15–35) required all gasoline sold for vehicles to contain 10% ethanol (E-10). In 2015, the requirement was repealed (Act 161, Session Laws of Hawaii 2015). In 2010, E-85 (85% ethanol) became available on a military base for flex fuel use. About 45,000,000 US gallons (170,000,000 L; 37,000,000 imp gal) of ethanol were imported from the Caribbean or continental US in 2009.

== Local production proposals ==
Prior to the mandate taking effect, several companies had registered to make ethanol in Hawaii, but none of the proposed projects were built. Sugarcane plantations were expected to make ethanol, possibly using fermentation of sugars from a fast-growing variety of sugarcane or cassava, or using a cellulosic process to convert fiber such as bagasse from other parts of the plant. Studies indicated that enough cane could be grown to meet the estimated ethanol demand of about 40 million gallons per year. Pacific West proposed to run an ethanol plant and a waste to electricity plant on Kauai and even reached a power agreement with Kauai Electric in 2008.

=== University of Hawaii Algae Research ===
The University of Hawaii is researching thermophilic algae by La Wahie to make ethanol. Sun makes algae grow faster in the tropics and animal feed may be available from process leftovers. CO_{2} is absorbed by the catalyst.

=== Big Island proposal ===
Several other ideas were proposed on the island of Hawaii where former cane fields lie fallow. One company wanted to use the wood grown in old cane areas that were planted with eucalyptus. High costs are an obstacle.

=== Kimo Sutton and Diamond Head Renewables ===
Diamond Head Renewable Resources LLC (DHRR) proposed to make alcohol fuels, including ethanol, from garbage, biomass green waste, or landfill methane. The syngas (synthesis gas) would be converted by catalysts to fuels, or the Syngas could be burned to generate electricity. The plant was projected to produce over 10 megawatts of power, for its own use and for the grid. The plant would have used 350 dry tons a day to make product and electricity, producing 12 million gallons of a mix of ethanol, methanol and other alcohols a year. The process and technology was similar to a proposal by Clear Fuels, without the sugar to ethanol element.

== Tax benefits and constraints ==
Food-based ethanol projects have had financial difficulty, because the incentives from the Farm act of 2008 emphasize cellulosic biomass to ethanol. Incentives include a $1/gallon tax credit, loan guarantees, and grants or funds available for small operations. State incentives include tax incentives and a business development department.

== See also ==
- Energy in Hawaii
- Ethanol fuel in Australia
- Ethanol fuel in Brazil
- Ethanol fuel in the Philippines
- Ethanol fuel in Sweden
- Ethanol fuel in the United States
