= Ethanol fuel in the United States =

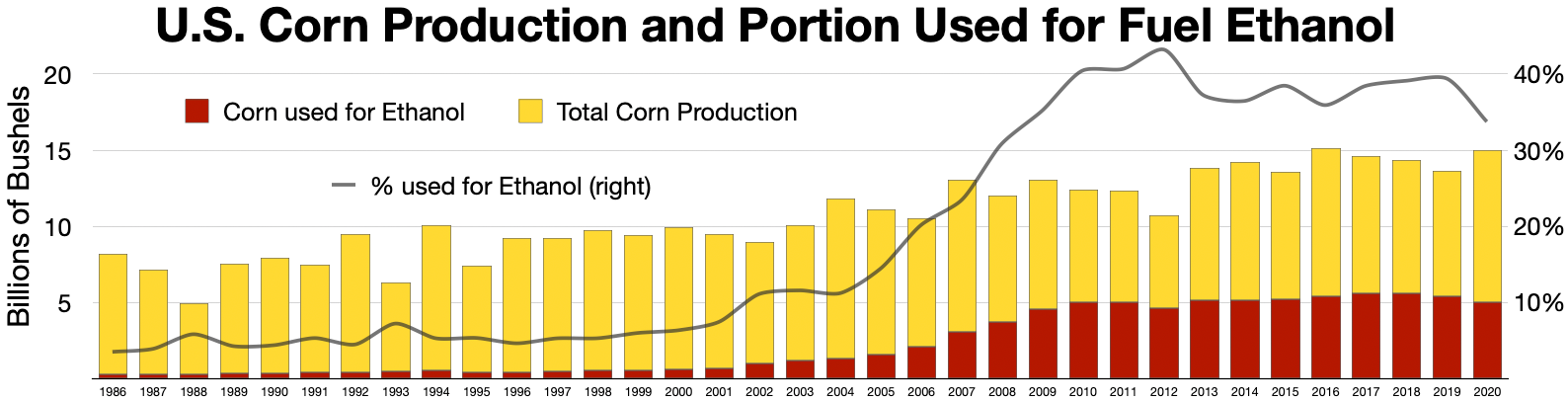
Corn vs Ethanol production in the United States Total corn production (bushels) (left) Corn used for Ethanol fuel (bushels) (left) Percent of corn used for Ethanol (right)

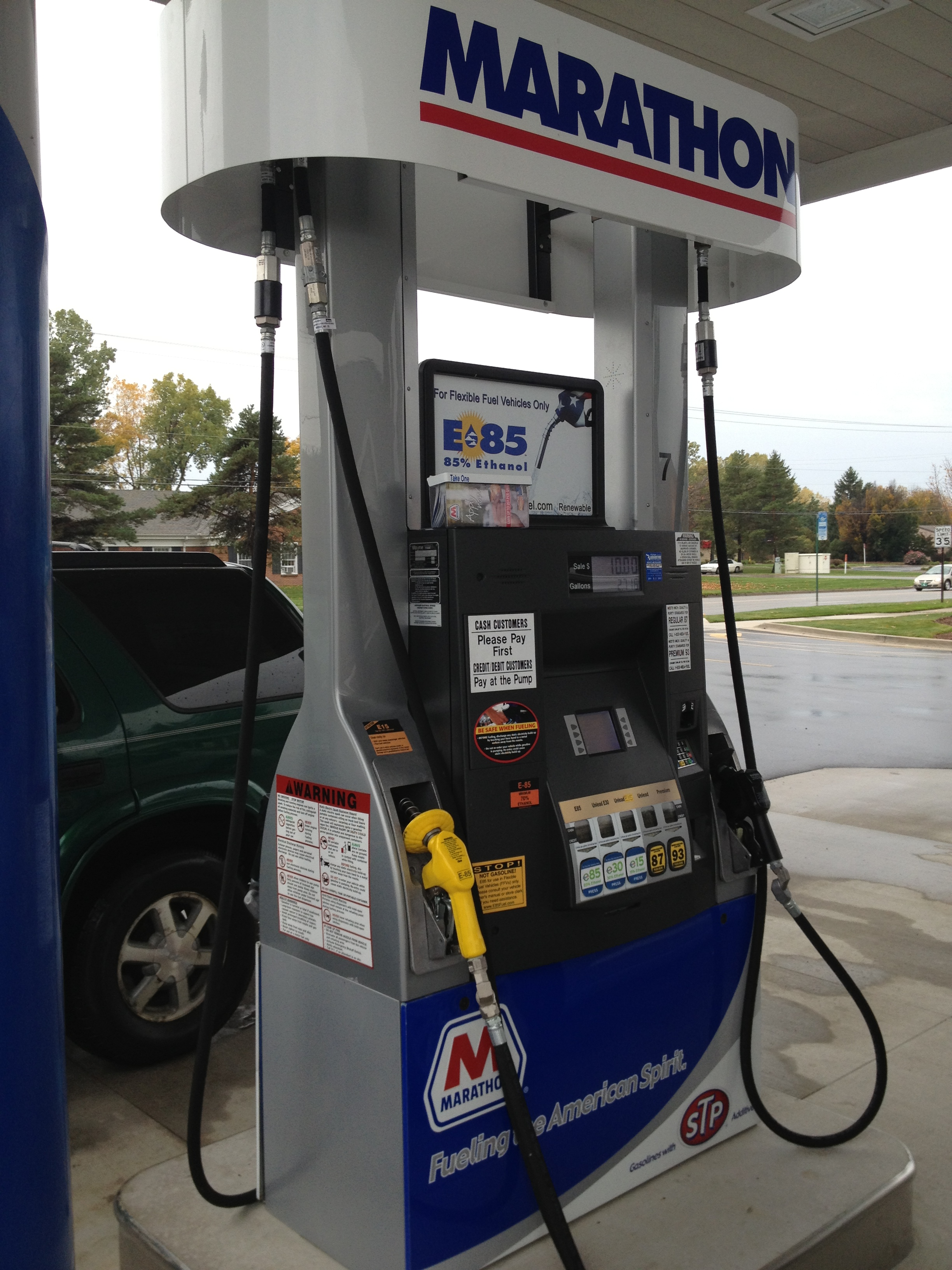
Blender fuels pump in 2012 selling the standard E10 ethanol blend together with E15, E30 and E85 in East Lansing, Michigan

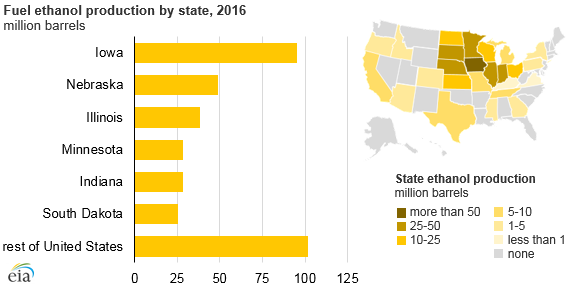
Ethanol fuel production by state

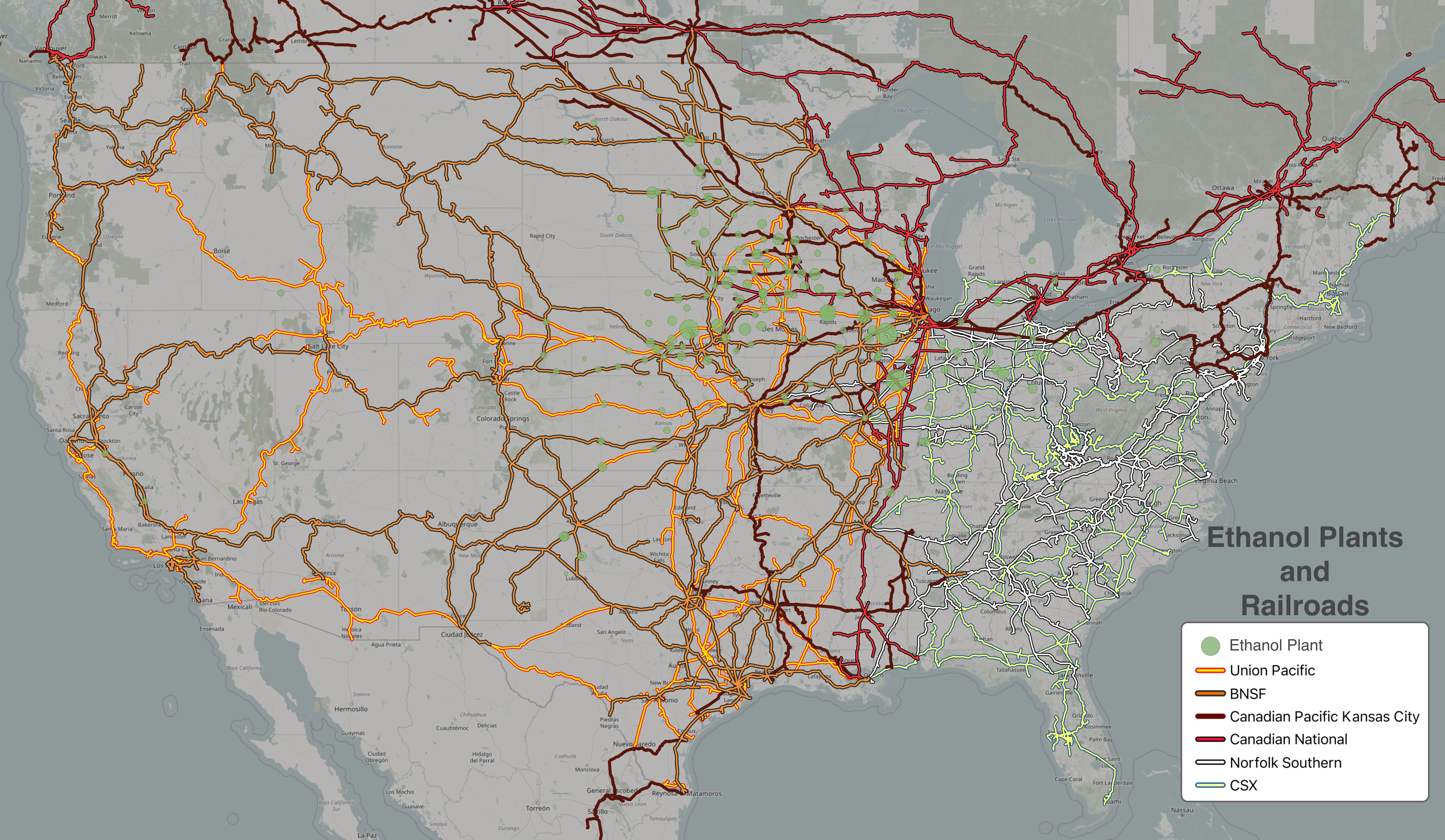
Ethanol plants in the US

The United States became the world's largest producer of ethanol fuel in 2005. The U.S. produced 15.8 billion U.S. liquid gallons of ethanol fuel in 2019, up from 13.9 billion gallons (52.6 billion liters) in 2011, and from 1.62 billion gallons in 2000. Brazil and U.S. production accounted for 87.1% of global production in 2011. In the U.S., ethanol fuel is mainly used as an oxygenate in gasoline in the form of low-level blends up to 10 percent, and, increasingly, as E85 fuel for flex-fuel vehicles. The U.S. government subsidizes ethanol production.

The ethanol market share in the U.S. gasoline supply grew by volume from just over 1 percent in 2000 to more than 3 percent in 2006 to 10 percent in 2011. Domestic production capacity increased fifteen times after 1990, from 900 million US gallons to 1.63 billion US gal in 2000, to 13.5 billion US gallons in 2010. The Renewable Fuels Association reported 209 ethanol distilleries in operation located in 29 states in 2011.

By 2012 most cars on U.S. roads could run on blends of up to 10% ethanol (E10), and manufacturers had begun producing vehicles designed for much higher percentages. However, the fuel systems of cars, trucks, and motorcycles sold before the ethanol mandate may suffer substantial damage from the use of 10% ethanol blends. Flexible-fuel cars, trucks, and minivans use gasoline/ethanol blends ranging from pure gasoline up to 85% ethanol (E85). By early 2013 there were around 11 million E85-capable vehicles on U.S. roads. Regular use of E85 is low due to lack of fueling infrastructure, but is common in the Midwest. In January 2011 the U.S. Environmental Protection Agency (EPA) granted a waiver to allow up to 15% of ethanol blended with gasoline (E15) to be sold only for cars and light pickup trucks with a model year of 2001 or later. The EPA waiver authorizes, but does not require stations to offer E15. Like the limitations suffered by sales of E85, commercialization of E15 is constrained by the lack of infrastructure as most fuel stations do not have enough pumps to offer the new E15 blend, few existing pumps are certified to dispense E15, and no dedicated tanks are readily available to store E15.

Historically most U.S. ethanol has come from corn, and the required electricity for many distilleries came mainly from coal. There is a debate about ethanol's sustainability and environmental impact. The primary issues related to the large amount of arable land required for crops and ethanol production's impact on grain supply, indirect land use change (ILUC) effects, as well as issues regarding its energy balance and carbon intensity considering its full life cycle.

== History ==
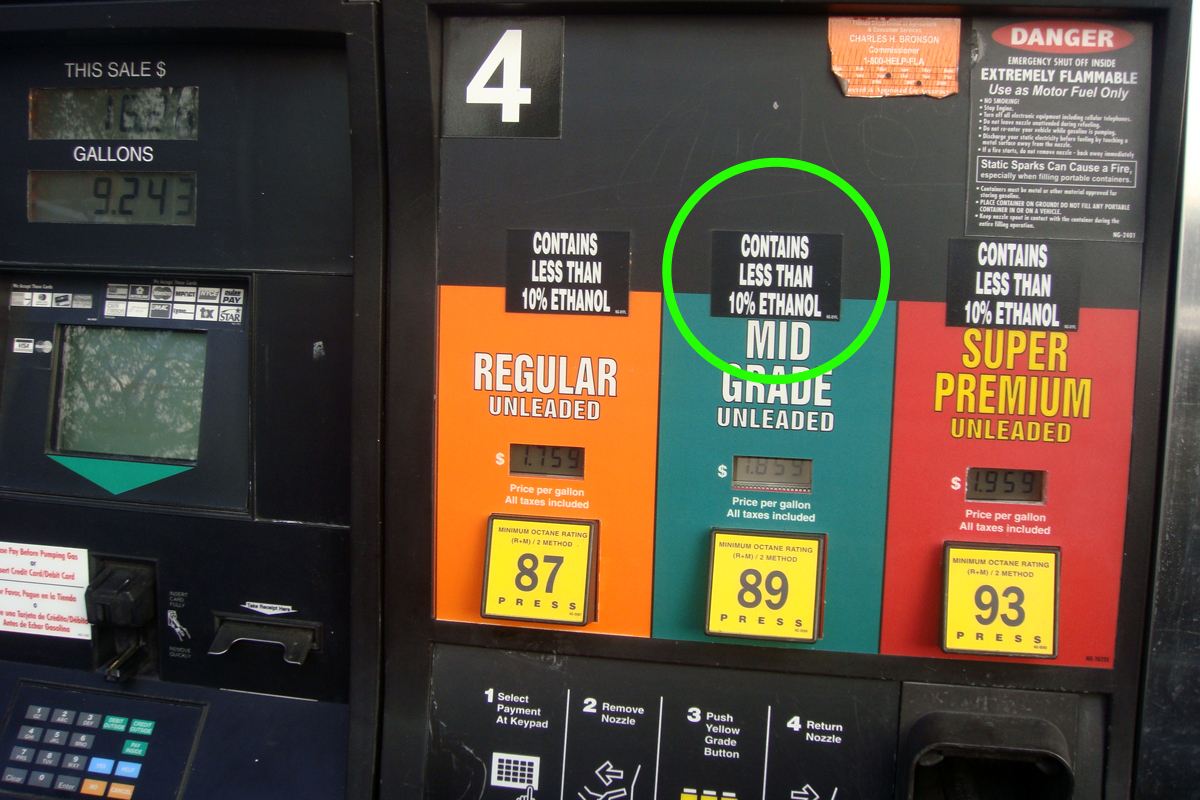
Typical label at the gas pumps warning drivers of ethanol content up to 10%, used as oxygenate additive instead of MTBE. Miami, Florida.

In 1826 Samuel Morey experimented with an internal combustion chemical mixture that used ethanol (combined with turpentine and ambient air then vaporized) as fuel. At the time, his discovery was overlooked, mostly due to the success of steam power. Ethanol fuel received little attention until 1860 when Nicholas Otto began experimenting with internal combustion engines. In 1859, oil was found in Pennsylvania, which decades later provided a new kind of fuel. Popular fuels in the U.S. before petroleum were a purified form of spirits of turpentine called camphene, and a blend of turpentine and alcohol known as burning fluid.

In 1896, Henry Ford designed his first car, the "Quadricycle" to run on pure ethanol. In 1908, the revolutionary Ford Model T was capable of running on gasoline, ethanol or a combination. Ford continued to advocate for ethanol fuel even during the prohibition, but lower prices caused gasoline to prevail.

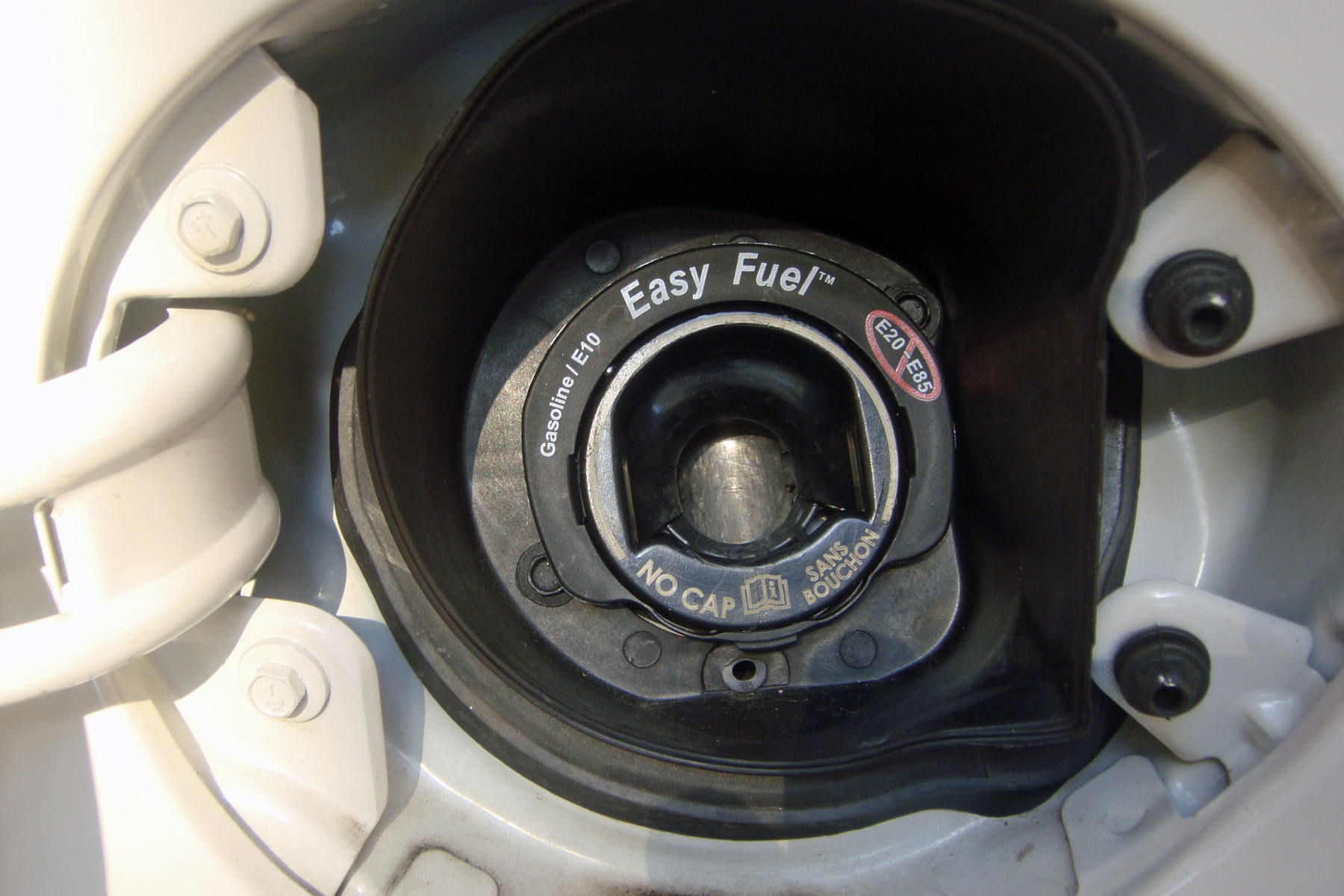
Typical manufacture's warning placed in the fuel filler of U.S. vehicles regarding the capability of using up to E10, and warning against the use of blends between E20 and E85.

Gasoline containing up to 10% ethanol began a decades-long growth in the United States in the late 1970s. The demand for ethanol produced from field corn was spurred by the discovery that methyl tertiary butyl ether (MTBE) was contaminating groundwater. MTBE's use as an oxygenate additive was widespread due to mandates in the Clean Air Act amendments of 1992 to reduce carbon monoxide emissions. MTBE in gasoline had been banned in almost 20 states by 2006. Suppliers were concerned about potential litigation and a 2005 court decision denying legal protection for MTBE. MTBE's fall from grace opened a new market for ethanol, its primary substitute. Corn prices at the time were around US$2 a bushel. Farmers saw a new market and increased production. This demand shift took place at a time when oil prices were rising.

The steep growth in twenty-first century ethanol consumption was driven by federal legislation aimed to reduce oil consumption and enhance energy security. The Energy Policy Act of 2005 required use of 7,500,000,000 US gal (2.8×10^{10} L) of renewable fuel by 2012, and the Energy Independence and Security Act of 2007 raised the standard, to 36,000,000,000 US gal (1.4×10^{11} L) of annual renewable fuel use by 2022. Of this requirement, 21,000,000,000 US gal (7.9×10^{10} L) had to be advanced biofuels, defined as renewable fuels that reduce greenhouse gas emissions by at least 50%.

== Recent trends ==
U.S. fuel ethanol production and imports (2000–2011) (Millions of U.S. liquid gallons)
Year	Production	Imports	Demand
2000	1,630	n/a	n/a
2001	1,770	n/a	n/a
2002	2,130	46	2,085
2003	2,800	61	2,900
2004	3,400	161	3,530
2005	3,904	135	4,049
2006	4,855	653	5,377
2007	6,500	450	6,847
2008	9,000	556	9,637
2009	10,600	193	10,940
2010	13,298	10	13,184
2011	13,929	160	n/a^{(1)}
2012	13,218		
2013	13,293		
2014	14,313		
2015	14,807		
2016	15,413		
2017	15,936		
2018	16,091		
2019	15,776		
Note: Demand figures includes stocks change and small exports in 2005. (1) Exports in 2011 reached a record 1,100 billion gal.
Graph of monthly production and net imports of fuel ethanol in the U.S. 1993–2012. Data from EIA

The world's top ethanol fuel producer in 2010 was the United States with 13.2 billion U.S. gallons (49.95 billion liters) representing 57.5% of global production, followed by Brazil with 6.92 billion U.S. gallons (26.19 billion liters), and together both countries accounted for 88% of the world production of 22.95 billion U.S. gallons (86.85 billion liters). By December 2010 the U.S. ethanol production industry consisted of 204 plants operating in 29 states, and 9 plants under construction or expansion, adding 560 million gallons of new capacity and bringing total U.S. installed capacity to 14.6 billion U.S. gallons (55.25 billion liters). At the end of 2010 over 90 percent of all gasoline sold in the U.S. was blended with ethanol.

=== Production ===
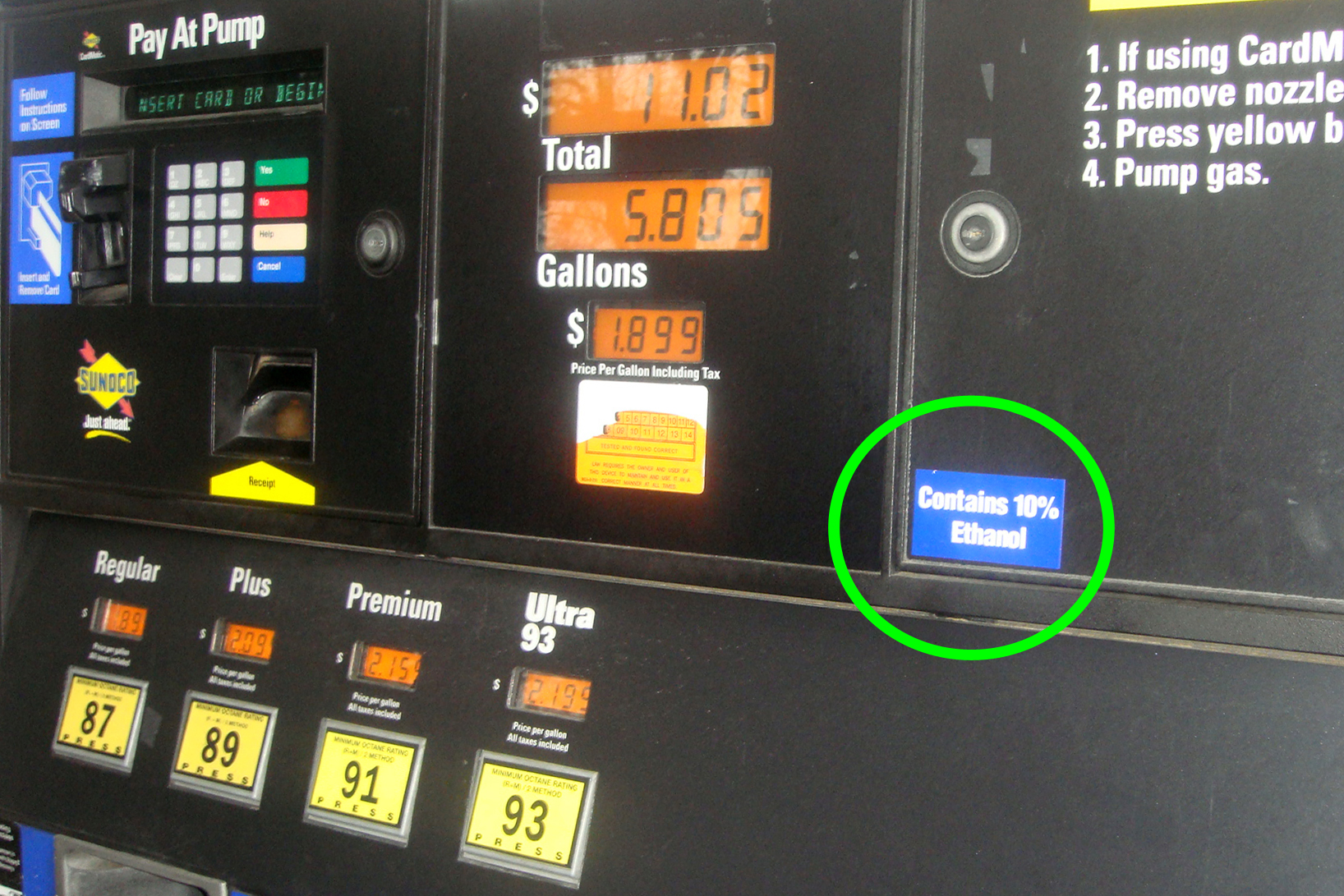
Most of the ethanol consumed in the U.S. is in the form of low blends with gasoline up to 10%. Shown a fuel pump in Maryland selling mandatory E10.

Beginning in late 2008 and early 2009, the industry came under financial stress due to that year's economic crisis. Motorists drove less and gasoline prices dropped sharply, while bank financing shrank. As a result, some plants operated below capacity, several firms closed plants, others laid off staff, some firms went bankrupt, plant projects were suspended and market prices declined. The Energy Information Administration raised concerns that the industry would not meet the legislated targets.

As of 2011, most of the U.S. car fleet was able to run on blends of up to 10% ethanol, and motor vehicle manufacturers produced vehicles designed to run on more concentrated blends. As of 2015, seven states – Missouri, Minnesota, Louisiana, Montana, Oregon, Pennsylvania, and Washington – required ethanol to be blended with gasoline in motor fuels. These states, particularly Minnesota, had more ethanol usage, and according to a source at Washington University, these states accumulated substantial environmental and economic benefits as a result. Florida required ethanol blends as of the end of 2010, but has since repealed it. Many cities had separate ethanol requirements due to non-attainment of federal air quality standards. In 2007, Portland, Oregon, became the first U.S. city to require all gasoline sold within city limits to contain at least 10% ethanol. Chicago has proposed the idea of mandating E15 in the city limits, while some area gas stations have already begun offering it.

Expanding ethanol (and biodiesel) industries provided jobs in plant construction, operations, and maintenance, mostly in rural communities. According to RFA the ethanol industry created almost 154,000 U.S. jobs in 2005, boosting household income by $5.7 billion. It also contributed about $3.5 billion in federal, state and local tax revenues.

=== E85 vehicles ===
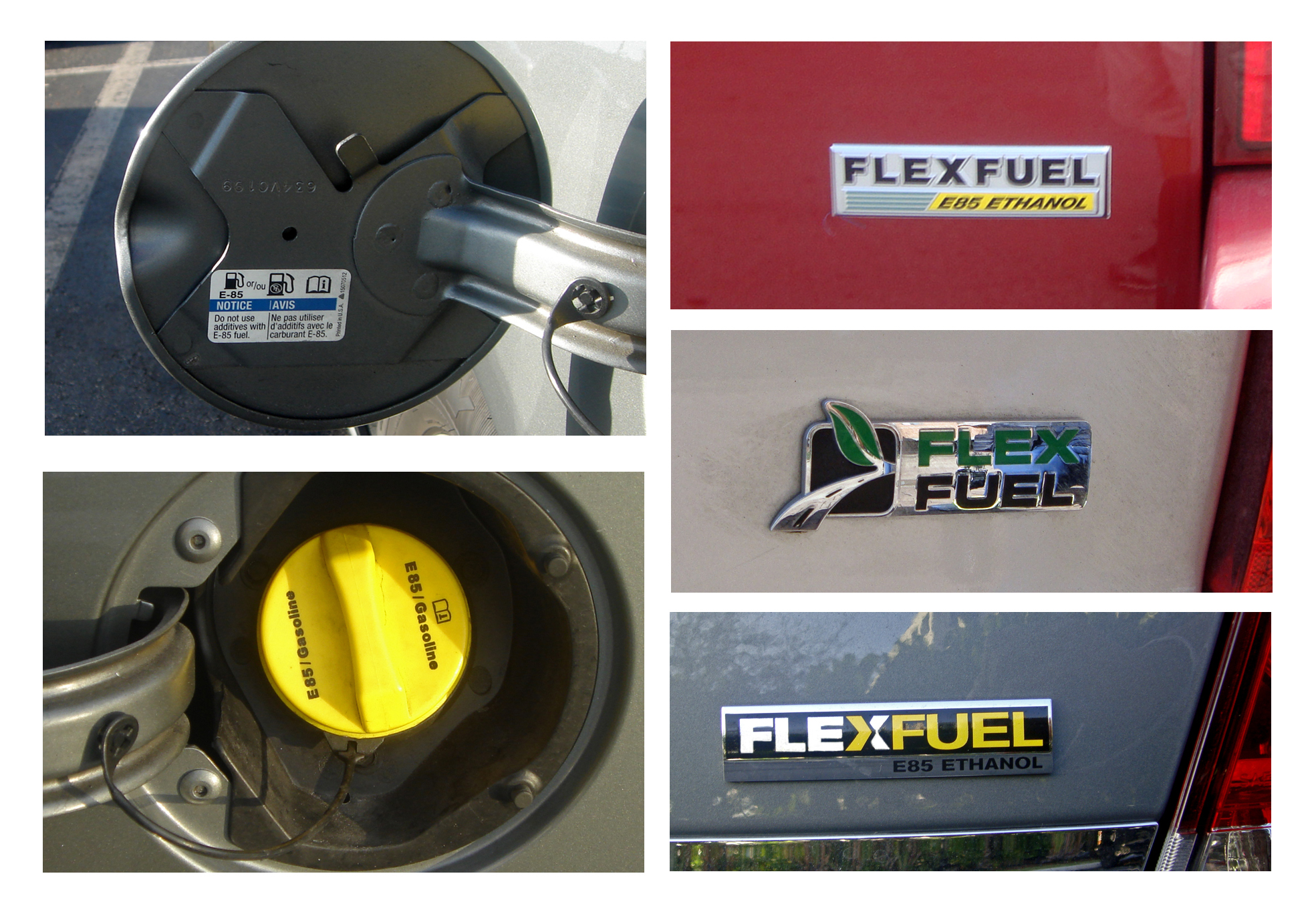
Typical labeling used in the U.S. to identify E85 flexible-fuel vehicles. Top left: a small sticker in the back of the fuel filler door. Bottom left: the bright yellow gas cap used in newer models. E85 Flexfuel badging used in newer models from Chrysler (top right), Ford (middle right) and GM (bottom right).

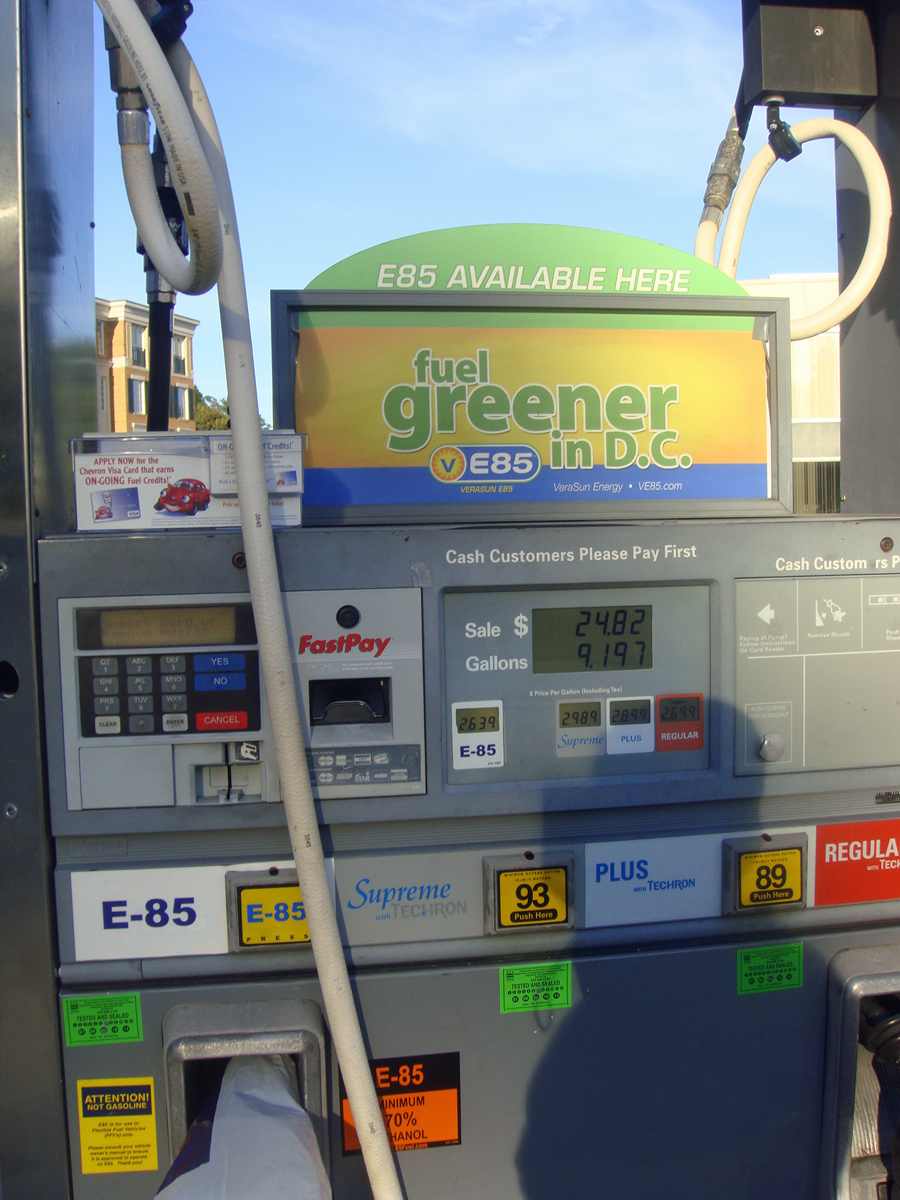
E85 fuel dispenser at a regular gasoline station, Washington, D.C.

Ford, Chrysler, and GM are among many automobile companies that sell flexible-fuel vehicles that can run blends ranging from pure gasoline to 85% ethanol (E85), and beginning in 2008 almost any type of automobile and light duty vehicle was available with the flex-fuel option, including sedans, vans, SUVs and pickup trucks. By early 2013, about 11 million E85 flex-fuel cars and light trucks were in operation, though actual use of E85 fuel was limited, because the ethanol fueling infrastructure was limited.

As of 2005, 68% of American flex-fuel car owners were not aware they owned an E85 flex. Flex and non-flex vehicles looked the same. There was no price difference. American automakers did not label these vehicles. In contrast, all Brazilian automakers clearly labeled FFVs with text that was some variant of the word Flex. Beginning in 2007 many new FFV models in the U.S. featured a yellow gas cap to remind drivers of the E85 capabilities. As of 2008, GM badged its vehicles with the text "Flexfuel/E85 Ethanol". Nevertheless, the U.S. Department of Energy (DOE) estimated that in 2009 only 504,297 flex-fuel vehicles were regularly fueled with E85, and these were primarily fleet-operated vehicles. As a result, only 712 million gallons were used for E85, representing just 1% of that year's ethanol consumption.

During the decade following 2000, E85 vehicles became increasingly common in the Midwest, where corn was a major crop.

Fueling infrastructure has been a major restriction hampering E85 sales. As of March 2013, there were 3,028 fueling stations selling E85 in the U.S. Most stations were in the Corn Belt states. As of 2008 the leading state was Minnesota with 353 stations, followed by Illinois with 181, and Wisconsin with 114. About another 200 stations that dispensed ethanol were restricted to city, state and federal government vehicles.

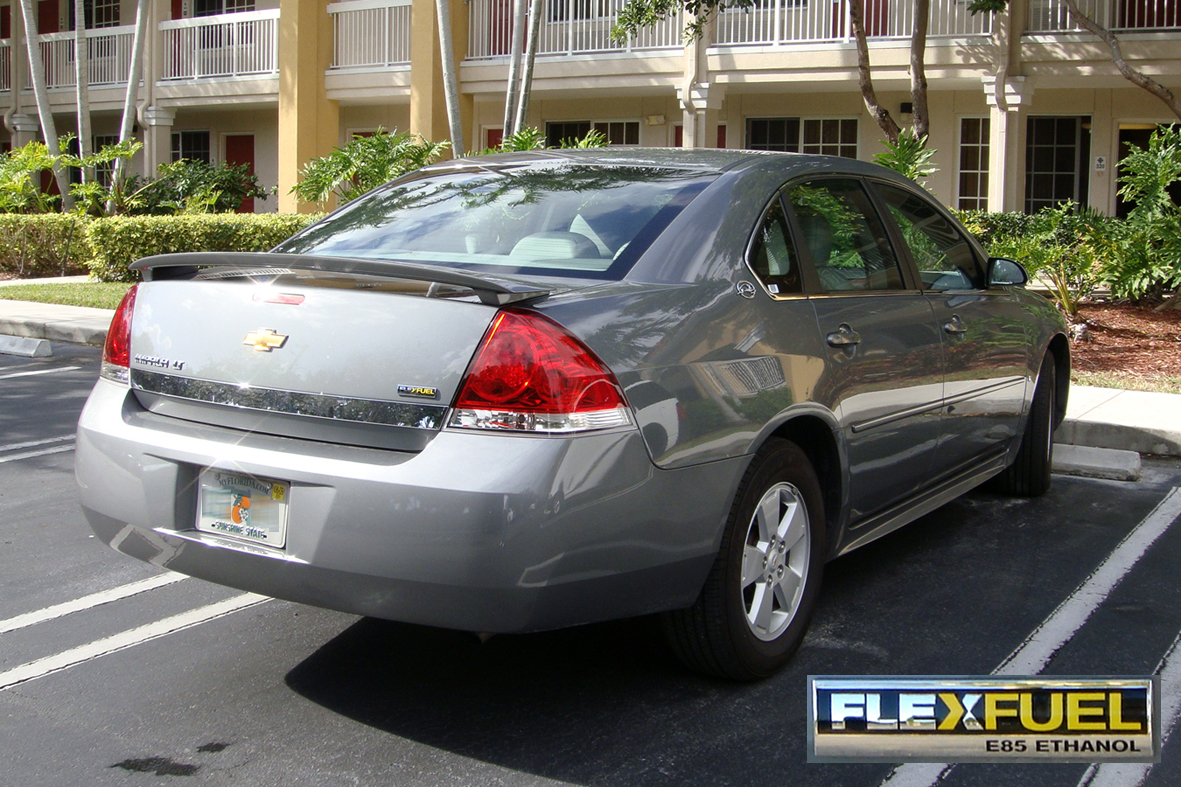
E85 flexfuel Chevrolet Impala LT 2009.

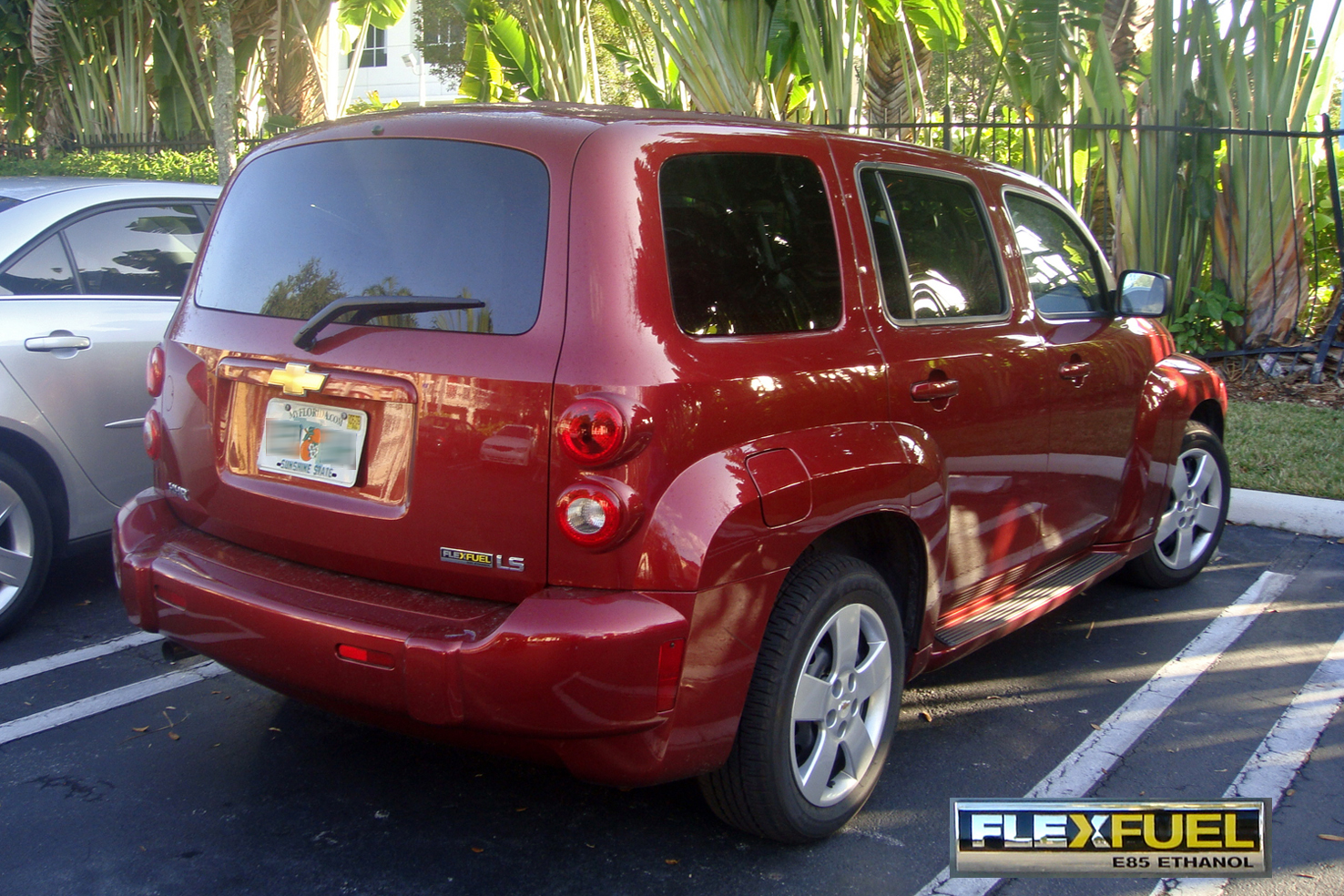
E85 flexfuel Chevrolet HHR

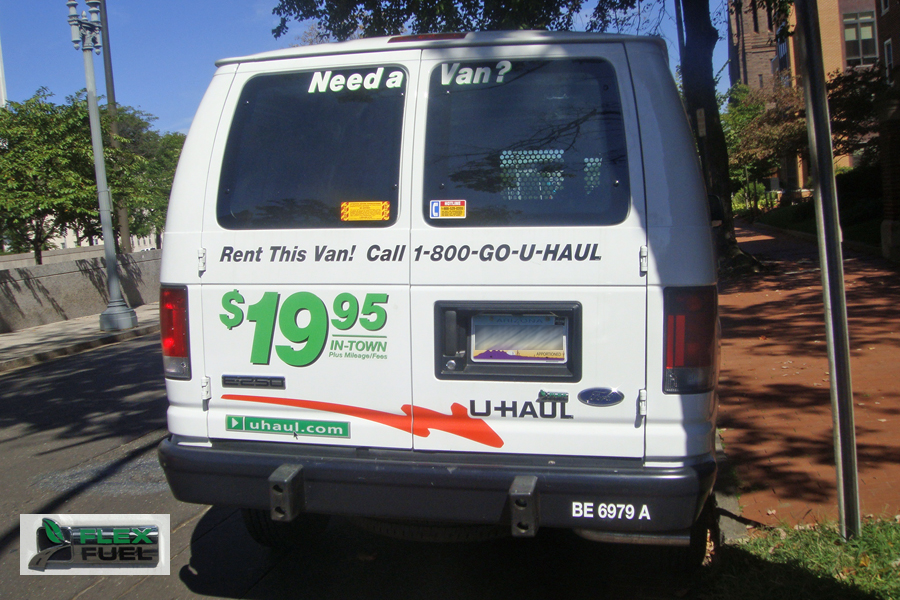
E85 flexfuel Ford E-250.

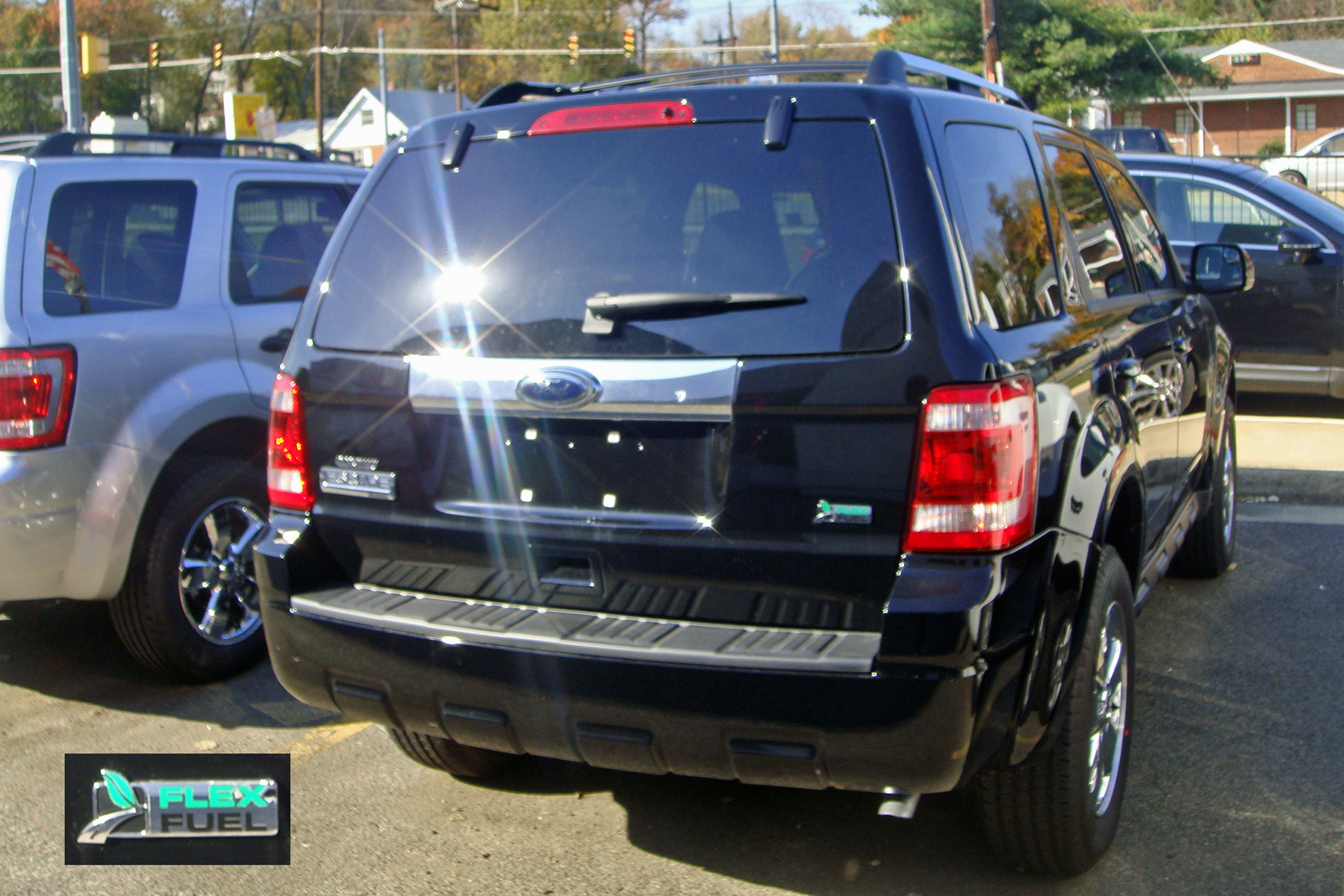
E85 flexfuel Ford Escape

=== E15 blend ===
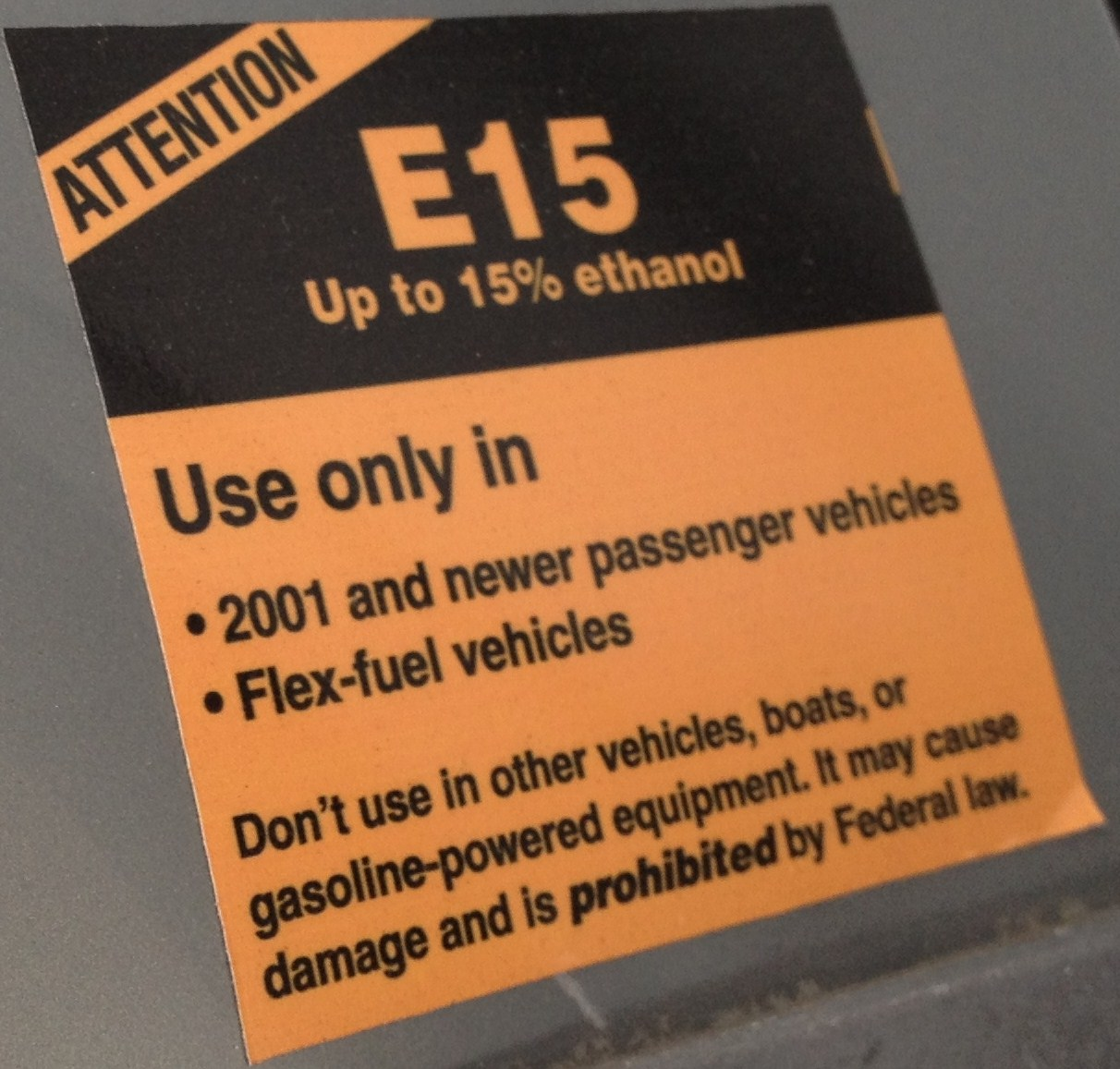
E15 warning sticker required to be displayed in all fuel dispensers selling that blend in the U.S.

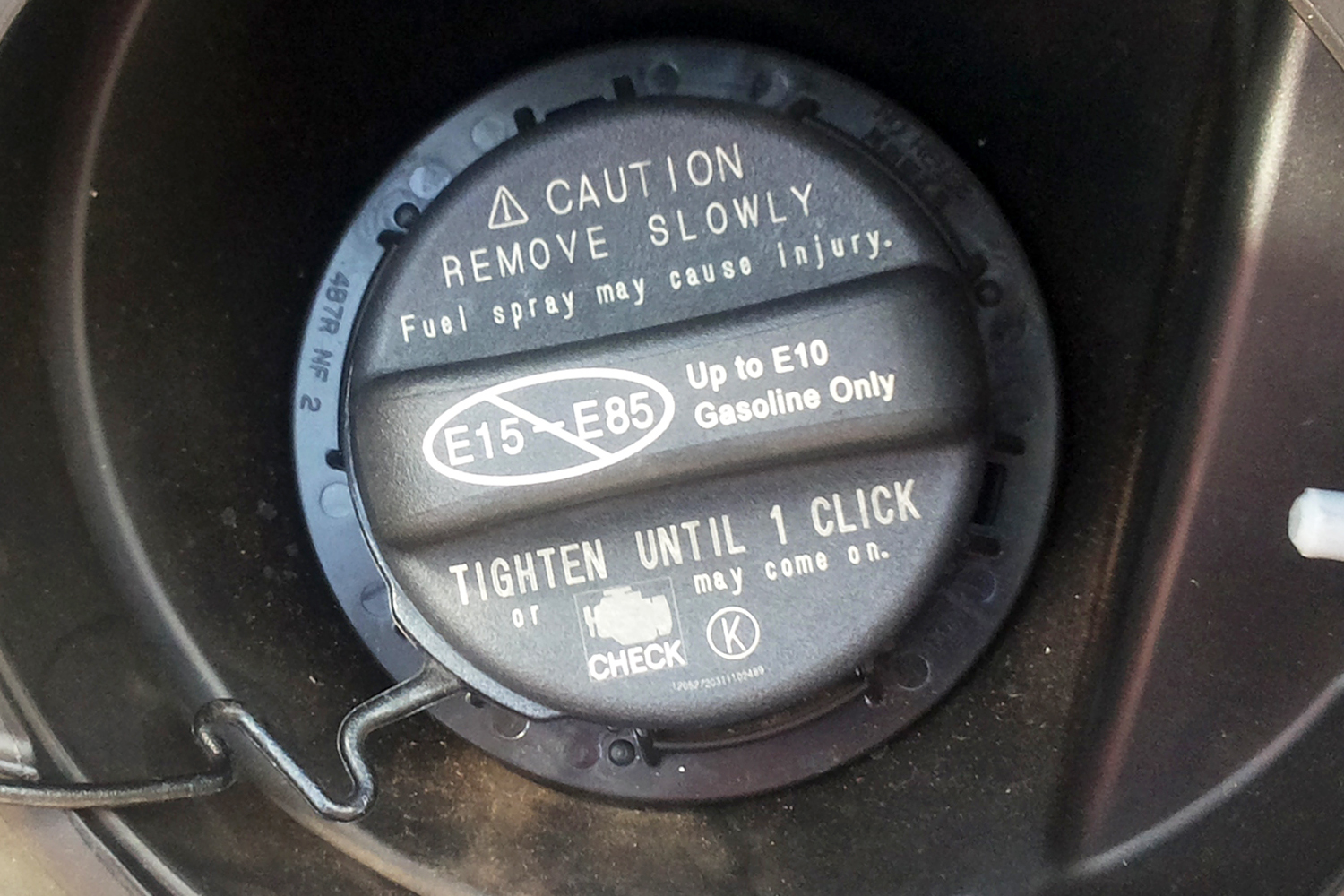
2012 Toyota Camry Hybrid fuel filler cap showing a warning regarding the maximum ethanol blend allowed by the carmaker, up to E10 gasoline. The warning label indicates that ethanol blends between E15 to E85 shall not be used in this vehicle.

In March 2009 Growth Energy, a lobbying group for the ethanol industry, formally requested the U.S. Environmental Protection Agency (EPA) to allow the ethanol content in gasoline to be increased to 15%, from 10%. In October 2010, the EPA granted a waiver to allow up to 15% blends to be sold for cars and trucks with a model year of 2007 or later, representing about 15% of vehicles on the roads. In January 2011 the waiver was expanded to authorize use of E15 to include model year 2001 through 2006 passenger vehicles. The EPA also decided not to grant any waiver for E15 use in any motorcycles, heavy-duty vehicles, or non-road engines because current testing data does not support such a waiver. According to the Renewable Fuels Association the E15 waivers now cover 62% of vehicles on the road in the country. In December 2010 several groups, including the Alliance of Automobile Manufacturers, the American Petroleum Institute, the Association of International Automobile Manufacturers, the National Marine Manufacturers Association, the Outdoor Power Equipment Institute, and the Grocery Manufacturers Association, filed suit against the EPA. In August 2012 the federal appeals court rejected the suit against the EPA ruling that the groups did not have legal standing to challenge EPA's decision to issue the waiver for E15. In June 2013 the U.S. Supreme Court declined to hear an appeal from industry groups opposed to the EPA ruling about E15 and let the 2012 federal appeals court ruling stand.

Vehicle compatibility issues with E15 gasoline were prominent in 2012. A survey that year by the American Automobile Association (AAA) found that only about 12 million of the more than 240 million light-duty vehicles on U.S. roads at the time were manufacturer-approved for E15. The AAA, in a November 2012 report, also highlighted warranty concerns, stating that BMW, Chrysler, Nissan, Toyota, and Volkswagen warned against covering E15-related damage. Despite this initial caution and in response to EPA regulations, several automakers began certifying newer models for E15 use. General Motors approved its 2012 and 2013 model year vehicles for E15, advising owners of pre-2011 models to adhere to fuel specifications in their manuals. Ford Motor Company made its full 2013 lineup, including hybrid electric and Ecoboost vehicles, E15 compatible. Porsche, according to the late 2012 AAA report, had approved E15 for its models built since 2001. Other manufacturers followed: Volkswagen announced its entire 2014 model year lineup would be E15 capable, and Fiat Chrysler Automobiles announced in August 2015 that all its 2016 model year Chrysler/Fiat, Jeep, Dodge, and Ram vehicles would be compatible.

Despite EPA's waiver, there is a practical barrier to the commercialization of the higher blend due to the lack of infrastructure, similar to the limitations suffered by sales of E85, as most fuel stations do not have enough pumps to offer the new blend, few existing pumps are certified to dispense E15, and there are no dedicated tanks readily available to store E15. In July 2012 a fueling station in Lawrence, Kansas became the first in the U.S. to sell the E15 blend. The fuel is sold through a blender pump that allows customers to choose between E10, E15, E30 or E85, with the latter blends sold only to flexible-fuel vehicles. This station was followed by a Marathon fueling station in East Lansing, Michigan. As of June 2013, there are about 24 fueling stations selling E15 out of 180,000 stations operating across the U.S.

As of November 2012, sales of E15 are not authorized in California, and according to the California Air Resources Board (CARB), the blend is still awaiting approval, and in a public statement the agency said that "it would take several years to complete the vehicle testing and rule development necessary to introduce a new transportation fuel into California's market."

=== Legislation and regulations ===
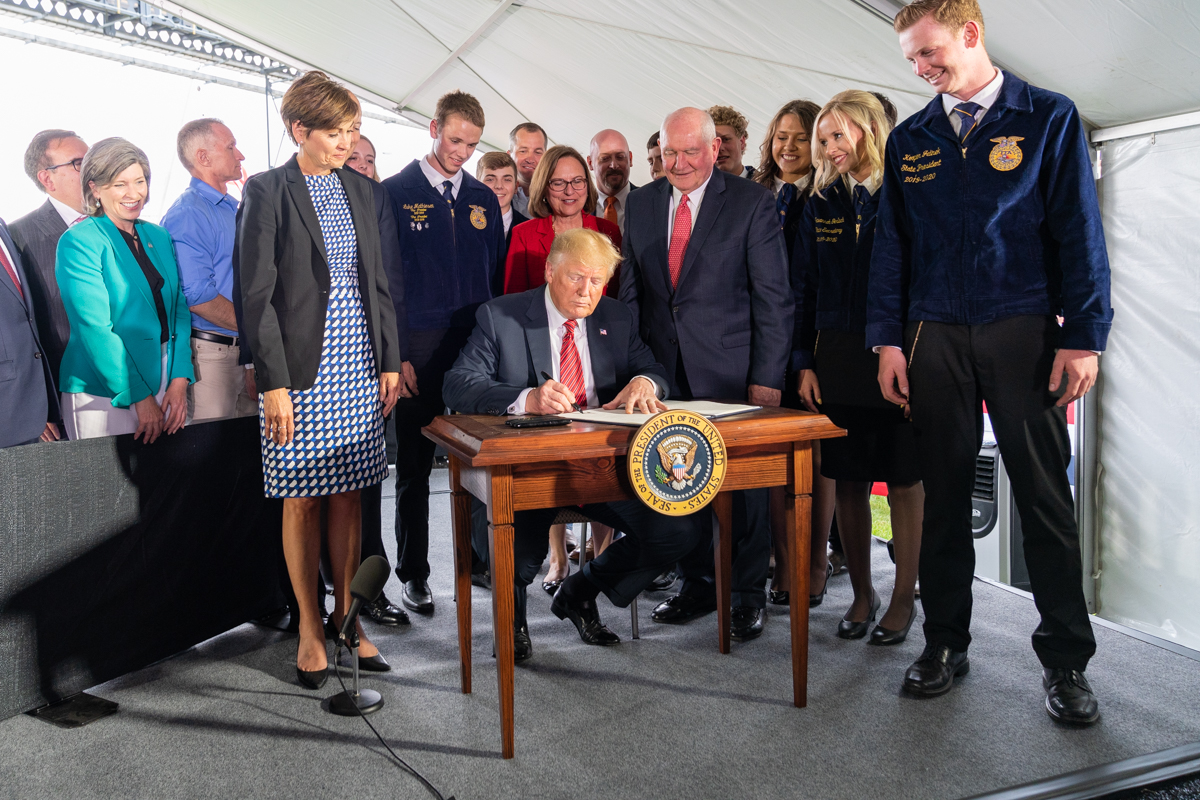
US President Donald Trump signs a 2019 executive order permitting the sale of 15% ethanol fuel year-round

The Energy Independence and Security Act of 2007, directed DOE to assess the feasibility of using intermediate ethanol blends in the existing vehicle fleet. The National Renewable Energy Laboratory (NREL) evaluated the potential impacts on legacy vehicles and other engines. In a preliminary report released in October 2008, NREL described the effects of E10, E15 and E20 on tailpipe and evaporative emissions, catalyst and engine durability, vehicle driveability, engine operability, and vehicle and engine materials. This preliminary report found that none of the vehicles displayed a malfunction indicator light; no fuel filter plugging symptoms were observed; no cold start problems were observed at 24 °C (75 °F) and 10 °C (50 °F) under laboratory conditions; and all test vehicles exhibited a loss in fuel economy proportional to ethanol's lower energy density. For example, E20 reduced average fuel economy by 7.7% when compared to gas-only (E0) test vehicles.

The Obama Administration set the goal of installing 10,000 blender pumps nationwide by 2015. These pumps can dispense multiple blends including E85, E50, E30 and E20 that can be used by E85 vehicles. The US Department of Agriculture (USDA) issued a rule in May 2011 to include flexible fuel pumps in the Rural Energy for America Program (REAP). This ruling provided financial assistance, via grants and loan guarantees, to fuel station owners to install E85 and blender pumps.

In May 2011 the Open Fuel Standard Act (OFS) was introduced to Congress with bipartisan support. The bill required that 50 percent of automobiles made in 2014, 80 percent in 2016, and 95 percent in 2017, be manufactured and warrantied to operate on non-petroleum-based fuels, which included existing technologies such as flex-fuel, natural gas, hydrogen, biodiesel, plug-in electric and fuel cell. Considering the rapid adoption of flexible-fuel vehicles in Brazil and the fact that the cost of making flex-fuel vehicles was approximately $100 per car, the bill's primary objective was to promote a massive adoption of flex-fuel vehicles capable of running on ethanol or methanol fuel.

In November 2013, the Environmental Protection Agency opened for public comment its proposal to reduce the amount of ethanol required in the U.S. gasoline supply as mandated by the Energy Independence and Security Act of 2007. The agency cited problems with increasing the blend of ethanol above 10%. This limit, known as the "blend wall", refers to the practical difficulty in incorporating increasing amounts of ethanol into the transportation fuel supply at volumes exceeding those achieved by the sale of nearly all gasoline as E10.

=== Contractual restrictions ===
Gasoline distribution contracts in the United States generally have provisions that make offering E15 and E85 difficult, expensive, or even impossible. Such provisions include requirements that no E85 be sold under the gas station canopy, labeling requirements, minimum sales volumes, and exclusivity provisions. Penalties for breach are severe and often allow immediate termination of the agreement, cutting off supplies to retailers. Repayment of franchise royalties and other incentives is often required.

== Energy security ==
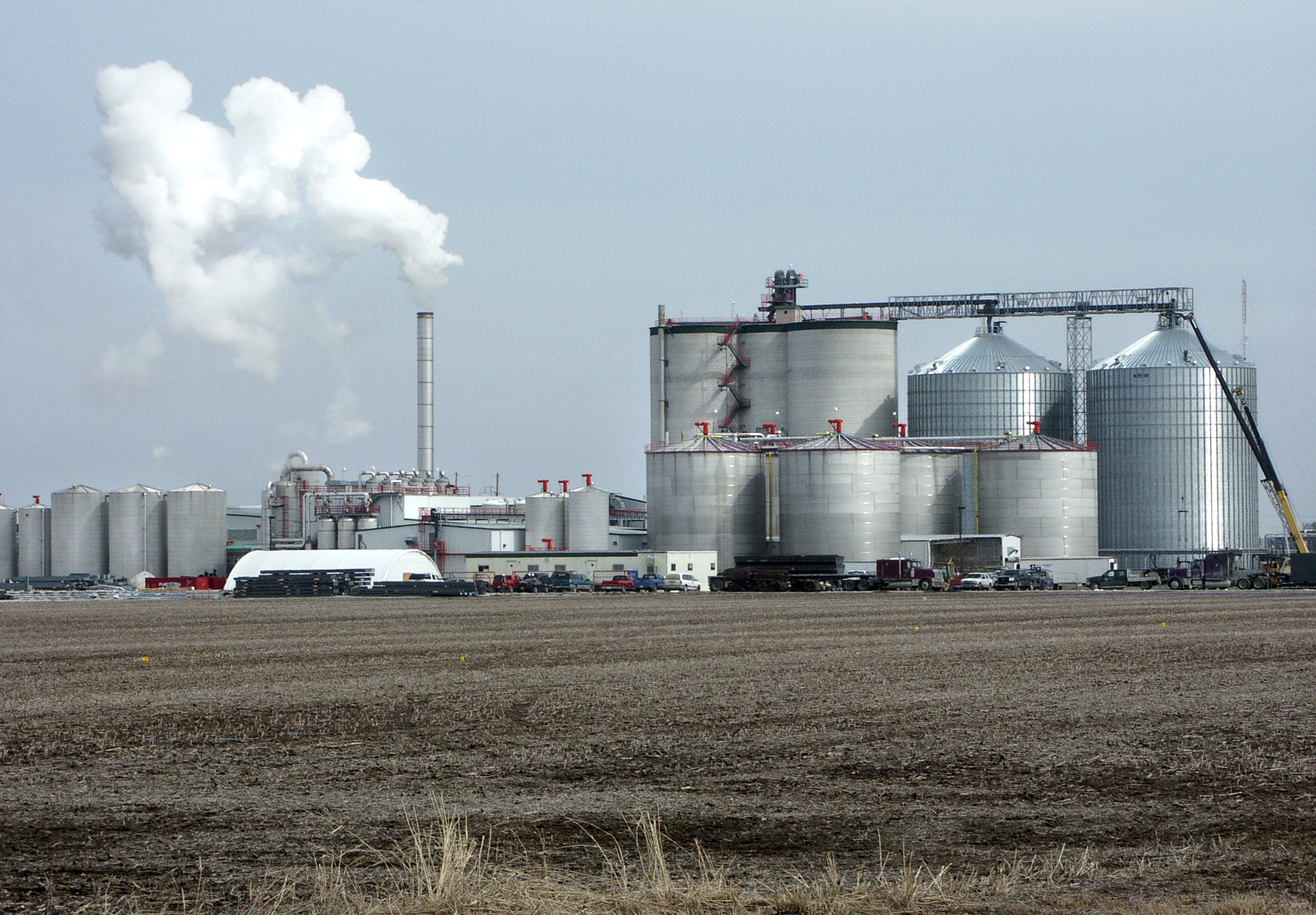
Ethanol fuel plant in West Burlington, Iowa.

One rationale for ethanol production in the U.S. is increased energy security, from shifting supply from oil imports to domestic sources. Ethanol production requires significant energy, and current U.S. production derives most of that energy from domestic coal, natural gas and other non-oil sources. Because in 2006, 66% of U.S. oil consumption was imported, compared to a net surplus of coal and just 16% of natural gas (2006 figures), the displacement of oil-based fuels to ethanol produced a net shift from foreign to domestic U.S. energy sources.

== Effect on gasoline prices ==
The effect of ethanol use on gasoline prices is the source of conflicting opinion from economic studies, further complicated by the non-market forces of tax credits, met and unmet government quotas, and the dramatic recent increase in domestic oil production. According to a 2012 Massachusetts Institute of Technology analysis, ethanol, and biofuel in general, does not materially influence the price of gasoline, while a runup in the price of government mandated Renewable Identification Number credits has driven up the price of gasoline. These are in contrast to a May 2012, Center for Agricultural and Rural Development study which showed a $0.29 to $1.09 reduction in per gallon gasoline price from ethanol use.

The U.S. consumed 138.2×10^{9} US gal (523×10^{6} m^{3}) of gasoline in 2008, blended with about 9.6×10^{9} US gal (36×10^{6} m^{3}) of ethanol, representing a market share of almost 7% of supply by volume. Given its lower energy content, ethanol fuel displaced about 6.4×10^{9} US gal (24×10^{6} m^{3}) of gasoline, representing 4.6 percent in equivalent energy units.

The EPA announced in November 2013, a reduction in mandated U.S. 2014 ethanol production, due to "market conditions".

== Tariffs and tax credits ==
Since the 1980s until 2011, domestic ethanol producers were protected by a 54-cent per gallon import tariff, mainly intended to curb Brazilian sugarcane ethanol imports. Beginning in 2004 blenders of transportation fuel received a tax credit for each gallon of ethanol they mix with gasoline. Historically, the tariff was intended to offset the federal tax credit that applied to ethanol regardless of country of origin. Several countries in the Caribbean Basin imported and reprocessed Brazilian ethanol, usually converting hydrated ethanol into anhydrous ethanol, for re-export to the United States. They avoided the 2.5% duty and the tariff, thanks to the Caribbean Basin Initiative (CBI) and free trade agreements. This process was limited to 7% of U.S. ethanol consumption.

As of 2011, blenders received a US$0.45 per gallon tax credit, regardless of feedstock; small producers received an additional US$0.10 on the first 15 million US gallons; and producers of cellulosic ethanol received credits up to US$1.01. Tax credits to promote the production and consumption of biofuels date to the 1970s. For 2011, credits were based on the Energy Policy Act of 2005, the Food, Conservation, and Energy Act of 2008, and the Energy Improvement and Extension Act of 2008.

A 2010 study by the Congressional Budget Office (CBO) found that in fiscal year 2009, biofuel tax credits reduced federal revenues by around US$6 billion, of which corn and cellulosic ethanol accounted for US$5.16 billion and US$50 million, respectively.

In 2010, CBO estimated that taxpayer costs to reduce gasoline consumption by one gallon were $1.78 for corn ethanol and $3.00 for cellulosic ethanol. In a similar way, and without considering potential indirect land use effects, the costs to taxpayers of reducing greenhouse gas emissions through tax credits were about $750 per metric ton of CO_{2}-equivalent for ethanol and around $275 per metric ton for cellulosic ethanol.

On June 16, 2011, the U.S. Congress approved an amendment to an economic development bill to repeal both the tax credit and the tariff, but this bill did not move forward. Nevertheless, the U.S. Congress did not extend the tariff and the tax credit, allowing both to end on December 31, 2011. Since 1980 the ethanol industry was awarded an estimated US$45 billion in subsidies.

== Feedstocks ==
=== Corn ===
Corn is the main feedstock used for producing ethanol fuel in the United States. Most of the controversies surrounding U.S. ethanol fuel production and use is related to corn ethanol's energy balance and its social and environmental impacts.

=== Sugar ===
United States fuel ethanol imports by country (2002–2007) (Millions of U.S. liquid gallons)
Country	2007	2006	2005	2004	2003
Brazil	188.8	433.7	31.2	90.3	0
Jamaica	75.2	66.8	36.3	36.6	39.3
El Salvador	73.3	38.5	23.7	5.7	6.9
Trinidad and Tobago	42.7	24.8	10.0	0	0
Costa Rica	39.3	35.9	33.4	25.4	14.7

Producing ethanol from sugar is simpler than converting corn into ethanol. Converting sugar requires only a yeast fermentation process. Converting corn requires additional cooking and the application of enzymes. The energy requirement for sugar conversion is about half that for corn. Sugarcane produces more than enough energy to do the conversion with energy left over. A 2006 U.S. Department of Agriculture report found that at market prices for ethanol, converting sugarcane, sugar beets and molasses to ethanol would be profitable. As of 2008 researchers were attempting to breed new varieties adapted to U.S. soil and weather conditions, as well as to take advantage of cellulosic ethanol technologies to also convert sugarcane bagasse.

U.S. sugarcane production occurs in Florida, Louisiana, Hawaii, and Texas. The first three plants to produce sugarcane-based ethanol went online in Louisiana in mid-2009. Sugar mills in Lacassine, St. James and Bunkie were converted to sugarcane ethanol production using Colombian technology to enable profitable ethanol production. These three plants planned to produce 100×10^{6} US gal (380×10^{3} m^{3}) of ethanol per year within five years.

By 2009 two other sugarcane ethanol production projects were being developed in Kauai, Hawaii and Imperial Valley, California. The Hawaiian plant was projected to have a capacity of between 12–15 million US gallons (45×10^{3}–57×10^{3} m^{3}) a year and to supply local markets only, as shipping costs made competing in the continental US impractical. This plant went online in 2010. The California plant was expected to produce 60×10^{6} US gal (230×10^{3} m^{3}) a year in 2011.

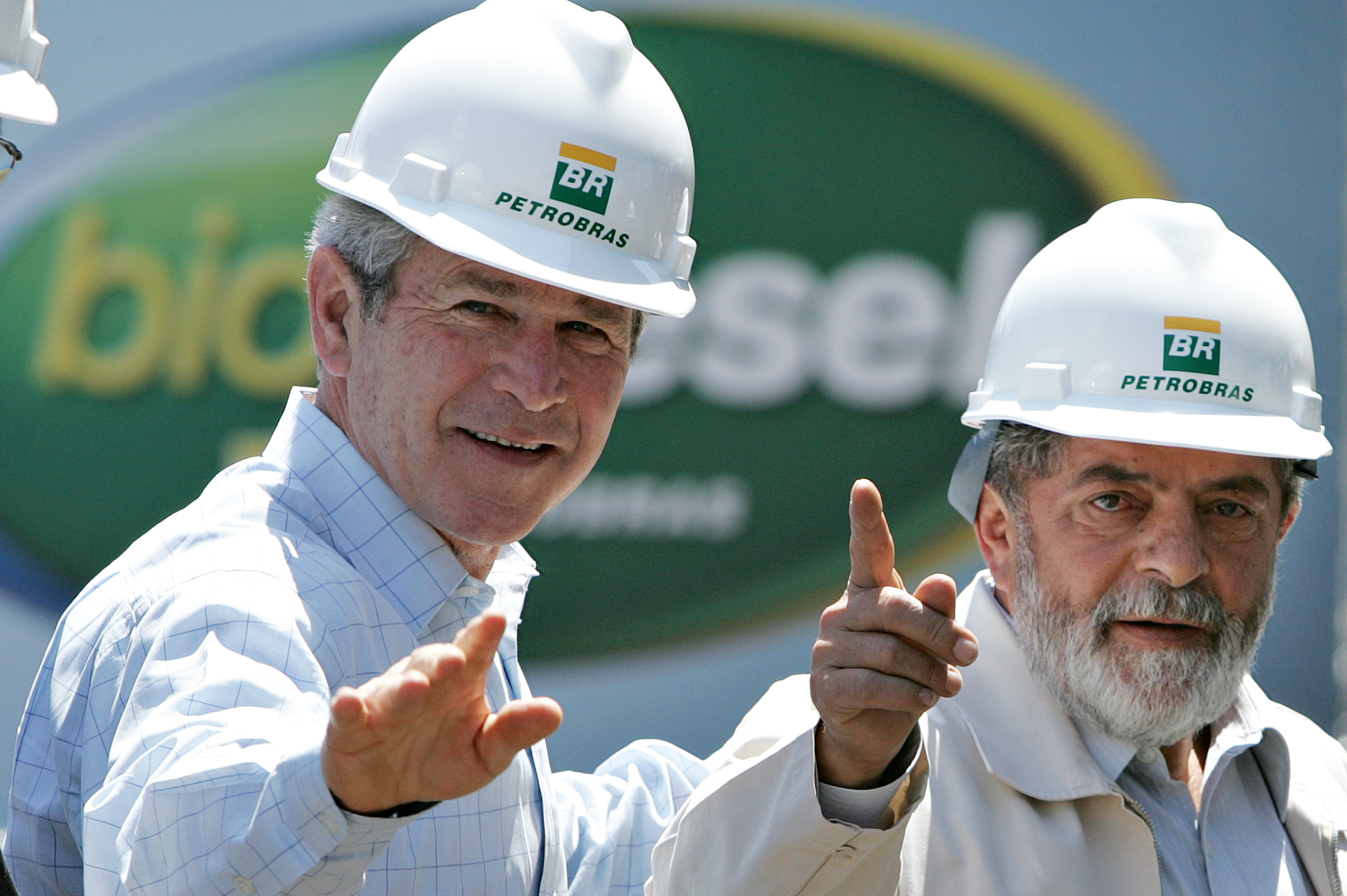
Presidents George W. Bush and Luiz Inácio Lula da Silva during Bush's visit to Brazil, March 2007.

In March 2007, "ethanol diplomacy" was the focus of President George W. Bush's Latin American tour, in which he and Brazil's president, Luiz Inácio Lula da Silva, promoted the production and use of sugarcane ethanol throughout the Caribbean Basin. The two countries agreed to share technology and set international biofuel standards. Brazilian sugarcane technology transfer was intended to permit various Central American, such as Honduras, El Salvador, Nicaragua, Costa Rica and Panama, several Caribbean countries, and various Andean Countries tariff-free trade with the U.S., thanks to existing trade agreements. The expectation was that such countries would export to the United States in the short-term using Brazilian technology.

In 2007, combined exports from Jamaica, El Salvador, Trinidad and Tobago and Costa Rica to the U.S. reached a total of 230.5×10^{6} US gal (873×10^{3} m^{3}) of sugarcane ethanol, representing 54.1% of imports. Brazil began exporting ethanol to the U.S. in 2004 and exported 188.8×10^{6} US gal (715×10^{3} m^{3}) representing 44.3% of U.S. ethanol imports in 2007. The remaining imports that year came from Canada and China.

=== Other feedstocks ===
Cheese whey, barley, potato waste, beverage waste, and brewery and beer waste have been used as feedstocks for ethanol fuel, but at a far smaller scale than corn and sugarcane ethanol, as plants using these feedstocks have the capacity to produce only 3 to 5 million US gallons (11×10^{3} to 19×10^{3} m^{3}) per year.

== Comparison with Brazilian ethanol ==
Sugarcane ethanol has an energy balance seven times greater than corn ethanol. As of 2007, Brazilian distiller production costs were 22 cents per liter, compared with 30 cents per liter for corn-based ethanol. Corn-derived ethanol costs 30% more because the corn starch must first be converted to sugar before distillation into alcohol. However, corn-derived ethanol offers the ability to return 1/3 of the feedstock to the market as a replacement for the corn used in the form of Distillers Dried Grain. Sugarcane ethanol production is seasonal: unlike corn, sugarcane must be processed into ethanol almost immediately after harvest.

Comparison of key characteristics between the ethanol industries in the United States and Brazil
Characteristic	Brazil	U.S.	Units/comments
Main feedstock	Sugar cane	Corn	Main cash crop for ethanol production, the U.S. has less than 2% from other crops.
Total ethanol fuel production (2011)	5,573	13,900	Million U.S. liquid gallons
Total arable land	355	270	Million hectares. Only contiguous U.S., excludes Alaska.
Total area used for ethanol crop (2006)	3.6 (1%)	10 (3.7%)	Million hectares (% total arable)
Productivity	6,800–8,000	3,800–4,000	Ethanol yield (liter/hectare). Brazil is 727 to 870 gal/acre (2006), U.S. is 321 to 424 gal/acre (2003–05)
Energy balance (input energy productivity)	8.3 to 10.2	1.3 to 1.6	Ratio of the energy obtained from ethanol/energy expended in its production
Estimated greenhouse gas emission reduction	86–90%^{(1)}	10–30%^{(1)}	% GHGs avoided by using ethanol instead of gasoline, using existing crop land, without ILUC effects.
EPA's estimated 2022 GHG reduction for RFS2.	61%^{(2)}	21%	Average % GHGs change as compared to gasoline and considering direct and indirect land use change effects.
CARB's full life-cycle carbon intensity	73.40	105.10^{(3)}	Grams of CO_{2} equivalent released per MJ of energy produced, includes indirect land use changes.
Estimated payback time for greenhouse gas emission	17 years^{(4)}	93 years^{(4)}	Brazilian cerrado for sugar cane and U.S. grassland for corn. Land use change scenarios by Fargione et al.
Flexible-fuel vehicles produced/sold (includes autos, light trucks and motorcycles)	16.3 million	10 million	All fleets as of December 2011. The Brazilian fleet includes 1.5 million flex fuel motorcycles. USDOE estimates that in 2009 only 504,297 flex-fuel vehicles were regularly fueled with E85 in the US.
Ethanol fueling stations in the country	35,017 (100%)	2,749 (1.6%)	As % of total gas stations in the country. Brazil by December 2007, U.S. by May 2011. (170,000 total.)
Ethanol's share within the gasoline market	50%^{(5)}	10%	As % of total consumption on a volumetric basis. Brazil as of April 2008. U.S. as of December 2010.
Cost of production (USD/US gallon)	0.83	1.14	2006/2007 for Brazil (22¢/liter), 2004 for U.S. (35¢/liter)
Notes: (1) Assuming no land use change. (2) Estimate is for U.S. consumption and sugarcane ethanol is imported from Brazil. Emissions from sea transport are included. Both estimates include land transport within the U.S. (3) CARB estimate for Midwest corn ethanol. California's gasoline carbon intensity is 95.86 blended with 10% ethanol. (4) Assuming direct land use change. (5) If diesel-powered vehicles are included and due to ethanol's lower energy content by volume, bioethanol represented 16.9% of the road sector energy consumption in 2007.

== Environmental and social impact ==
=== Environmental effects ===
==== Energy balance and carbon intensity ====
Until 2008, several full life cycle ("Well to Wheels") studies had found that corn ethanol reduces greenhouse gas emissions as compared to gasoline. In 2007 a team led by Farrel from the University of California, Berkeley evaluated six previous studies and concluded corn ethanol reduces greenhouse gas emissions by only 13 percent. Another figure is 20 to 30 percent, and an 85 to 85 percent reduction for cellulosic ethanol. Both figures were estimated by Wang from Argonne National Laboratory, based on a comprehensive review of 22 studies conducted between 1979 and 2005, and simulations with Argonne's GREET model. All of these studies included direct land use changes. However, further research examining the actual effects of the Renewable Fuel Standard from 2008 to 2016 has concluded that corn ethanol produces more carbon emissions per unit of energy – likely more than 24% more – than gasoline, when factoring in fertilizer use and land use change.

The reduction estimates on carbon intensity for a given biofuel depend on the assumptions regarding several variables, including crop productivity, agricultural practices, and distillery power source and energy efficiency. None of these earlier studies considered the effects of indirect land-use changes, and though their impact was recognized, its estimation was considered too complex and more difficult to model than direct land use changes.

==== Effects of land use change ====
Summary of Searchinger et al. (2008) comparison of corn ethanol and gasoline GHG emissions with and without land use change (CO_{2} release rate (g/MJ))
Fuel type (U.S.)	Carbon intensity	Reduction; GHG	Carbon intensity + ILUC	Reduction; GHG
Gasoline	92	-	92	-
Corn ethanol	74	-20%	177	+93%
Cellulosic ethanol	28	-70%	138	+50%
Notes: Calculated using default assumptions for 2015 scenario for ethanol in E85. Gasoline is a combination of conventional and reformulated gasoline.

Two 2008 studies, both published in the same issue of Scienceexpress, questioned the previous assessments. A team led by Searchinger from Princeton University concluded that once direct and indirect effect of land use changes (ILUC) are considered, both corn and cellulosic ethanol increased carbon emissions as compared to gasoline by 93 and 50 percent respectively. The study limited the analysis to a 30-year time horizon, assuming that land conversion emitted 25 percent of the carbon stored in soils and all carbon in plants cleared for cultivation. Brazil, China and India were considered among the overseas locations where land use change would occur as a result of diverting U.S. corn cropland, and it was assumed that new cropland in each of these regions correspond to different types of forest, savanna or grassland based on the historical proportion of each natural land converted to cultivation in these countries during the 1990s.

A team led by Fargione from The Nature Conservancy found that clearing natural lands for use as agricultural land to produce biofuel feedstock creates a carbon debt. Therefore, this carbon debt applies to both direct and indirect land use changes. The study examined six scenarios of wilderness conversion, Brazilian Amazon to soybean biodiesel, Brazilian Cerrado to soybean biodiesel, Brazilian Cerrado to sugarcane ethanol, Indonesian or Malaysian lowland tropical rainforest to palm biodiesel, Indonesian or Malaysian peatland tropical rainforest to oil palm forest, and U.S. Central grassland to corn ethanol.

Growing corn to fuel internal combustion vehicles is a highly inefficient use of land. A solar farm generating electricity to power an electric vehicle would power around 85 times as much distance as corn ethanol grown on the same area.

==== Low-carbon fuel standards ====
On April 23, 2009, the California Air Resources Board approved specific rules and carbon intensity reference values for the California Low-Carbon Fuel Standard (LCFS) that was to go into effect on January 1, 2011. The consultation process produced controversy regarding the inclusion and modeling of indirect land use change effects. After the CARB's ruling, among other criticisms, representatives of the ethanol industry complained that the standard overstated the negative environmental effects of corn ethanol, and also criticized the inclusion of indirect effects of land-use changes as an unfair penalty to home-made corn ethanol because deforestation in the developing world had been tied to U.S. ethanol production. The emissions standard for 2011 for LCFS meant that Midwest corn ethanol would not meet the California standard unless current carbon intensity is reduced.

A similar controversy arose after the U.S. Environmental Protection Agency (EPA) published on May 5, 2009, its notice of proposed rulemaking for the new Renewable Fuel Standard (RFS). EPA's proposal included the carbon footprint from indirect land-use changes. On the same day, President Barack Obama signed a Presidential Directive with the aim to advance biofuel research and commercialization. The Directive asked a new Biofuels Interagency Working Group comprising the Department of Agriculture, EPA, and DOE, to develop a plan to increase flexible fuel vehicle use, assist in retail marketing and to coordinate infrastructure policies.

The group also was tasked to develop policy ideas for increasing investment in next-generation fuels, and for reducing biofuels' environmental footprint.

In December 2009 two lobbying groups, the Renewable Fuels Association (RFA) and Growth Energy, filed a lawsuit challenging LCFS's constitutionality. The two organizations argued that LCFS violates both the Supremacy Clause and the Commerce Clause of the US Constitution, and "jeopardizes the nationwide market for ethanol." In a press release the associations announced that "If the United States is going to have a low carbon fuel standard, it must be based on sound science and it must be consistent with the U.S. Constitution".

On February 3, 2010, EPA finalized the Renewable Fuel Standard Program (RFS2) for 2010 and beyond. EPA incorporated direct emissions and significant indirect emissions such as emissions from land use changes along with comments and data from new studies. Adopting a 30-year time horizon and a 0% discount rate EPA declared that ethanol produced from corn starch at a new (or expanded capacity from an existing) natural gas-fired facility using approved technologies would be considered to comply with the 20% GHG emission reduction threshold. Given average production conditions it expected for 2022, EPA estimated that corn ethanol would reduce GHGs an average of 21% compared to the 2005 gasoline baseline. A 95% confidence interval spans a 7-32% range reflecting uncertainty in the land use change assumptions.

The following table summarizes the mean GHG emissions for ethanol using different feedstocks estimated by EPA modelling and the range of variations considering that the main source of uncertainty in the life cycle analysis is the GHG emissions related to international land use change.

U.S. Environmental Protection Agency Life cycle year 2022 GHG emissions reduction results for RFS2 final rule (includes direct and indirect land use change effects and a 30-year payback period at a 0% discount rate)
Renewable fuel pathway (for U.S. consumption)	Mean GHG emission reduction^{(1)}	GHG emission reduction 95% confidence interval^{(2)}	Assumptions/comments
Corn ethanol	21%	7–32%	New or expanded natural gas fired dry mill plant, 37% wet and 63% dry DGS it produces, and employing corn oil fractionation technology.
Corn biobutanol	31%	20–40%	Natural gas fired dry mill plant, 37% wet and 63% dry DGS it produces, and employing corn oil fractionation technology.
Cellulosic ethanol from switchgrass	110%	102–117%	Ethanol produced using the biochemical process.
Cellulosic ethanol from corn stover	129%	No ILUC	Ethanol produced using the biochemical process. Ethanol produced from agricultural residues does not have any indirect land use emissions.
Notes: (1) Percent reduction in lifecycle GHG emissions compared to the average lifecycle GHG for gasoline or diesel sold or distributed as transportation fuel in 2005. (2) Confidence range accounts for uncertainty in the types of land use change assumptions and the magnitude of resulting GHG emissions.

==== Water footprint ====
Water-related concerns relate to water supply and quality, and include availability and potential overuse, pollution, and possible contamination by fertilizers and pesticides. Several studies concluded that increased ethanol production was likely to result in a substantial increase in water pollution by fertilizers and pesticides, with the potential to exacerbate eutrophication and hypoxia, particularly in the Chesapeake Bay and the Gulf of Mexico.

Growing feedstocks consumes most of the water associated with ethanol production. Corn consumes from 500–2,000 litres (110–440 imp gal; 130–530 US gal) of water per liter of ethanol, mostly for evapotranspiration. In general terms, both corn and switchgrass require less irrigation than other fuel crops. Corn is grown mainly in regions with adequate rainfall. However, corn usually needs to be irrigated in the drier climates of Nebraska and eastern Colorado. Further, corn production for ethanol is increasingly taking place in areas requiring irrigation. A 2008 study by the National Research Council concluded that "in the longer term, the likely expansion of cellulosic biofuel production has the potential to further increase the demand for water resources in many parts of the United States. Biofuels expansion beyond current irrigated agriculture, especially in dry western areas, has the potential to greatly increase pressure on water resources in some areas."

A 2009 study estimated that irrigated corn ethanol implied water consumption at between 50 US gal/mi (120 L/km) and 100 US gal/mi (240 L/km) for U.S. vehicles. This figure increased to 90 US gal/mi (210 L/km) for sorghum ethanol from Nebraska, and 115 US gal/mi (270 L/km) for Texas sorghum. By contrast, an average U.S. car effectively consumes between 0.2 US gal/mi (0.47 L/km) to 0.5 US gal/mi (1.2 L/km) running on gasoline, including extraction and refining.

In 2010 RFA argued that more efficient water technologies and pre-treated water could reduce consumption. It further claimed that non-conventional oil "sources, such as tar sands and oil shale, require far more water than conventional petroleum extraction and refining."

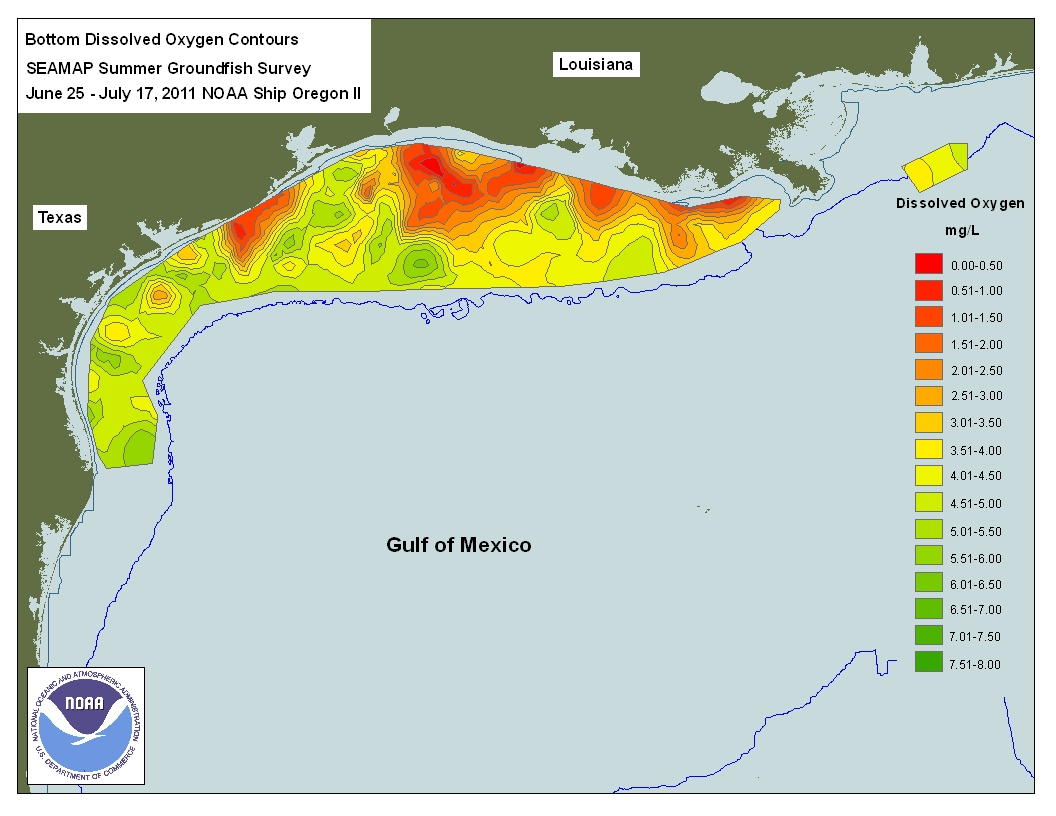
Dead zone in the Gulf of Mexico.

U.S. standard agricultural practices for most crops employ fertilizers that provide nitrogen and phosphorus along with herbicides, fungicides, insecticides, and other pesticides.

Some part of these chemicals leaves the field. Nitrogen in forms such as nitrate (NO_{3}) is highly soluble, and along with some pesticides infiltrates downwards toward the water table, where it can migrate to water wells, rivers and streams. A 2008 National Research Council study found that regionally the highest stream concentrations occur where the rates of application were highest, and that these rates were highest in the Corn Belt. These flows mainly stem from corn, which as of 2010 was the major source of total nitrogen loading to the Mississippi River.

Several studies found that corn ethanol production contributed to the worsening of the Gulf of Mexico dead zone. The nitrogen leached into the Mississippi River and out into the Gulf, where it fed giant algae blooms. As the algae died, it settled to the ocean floor and decayed, consuming oxygen and suffocating marine life, causing hypoxia. This oxygen depletion killed shrimp, crabs, worms and anything else that could not escape, and affected important shrimp fishing grounds.

=== Social implications ===
==== Effect on food prices ====
Some environmentalists, such as George Monbiot, expressed fears that the marketplace would convert crops to fuel for the rich, while the poor starved and biofuels caused environmental problems. The food vs fuel debate grew in 2008 as a result of the international community's concerns regarding the steep increase in food prices. In April 2008, Jean Ziegler, back then United Nations Special Rapporteur on the Right to Food, repeated his claim that biofuels were a "crime against humanity", echoing his October 2007 call for a 5-year ban for the conversion of land for the production of biofuels. Also in April 2008, World Bank President Robert Zoellick stated that "While many worry about filling their gas tanks, many others around the world are struggling to fill their stomachs. And it's getting more and more difficult every day."

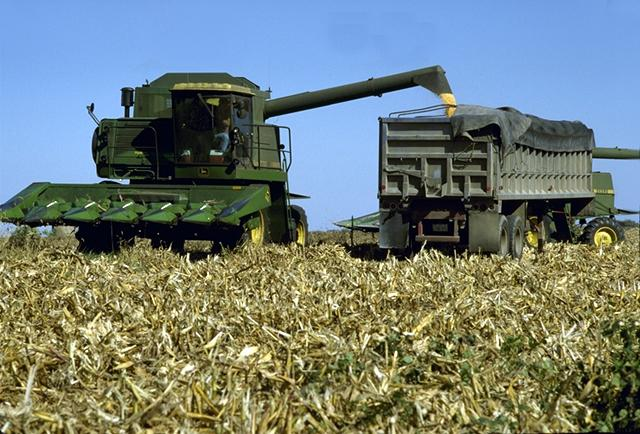
Corn is the main feedstock for the production of ethanol fuel in the U.S.

A July 2008 World Bank report found that from June 2002 to June 2008 "biofuels and the related consequences of low grain stocks, large land use shifts, speculative activity and export bans" accounted for 70–75% of total price rises. The study found that higher oil prices and a weak dollar explain 25–30% of total price rise. The study said that "large increases in biofuels production in the United States and Europe are the main reason behind the steep rise in global food prices." The report argued that increased production of biofuels in these developed regions was supported by subsidies and tariffs, and claimed that without such policies, food price increases worldwide would have been smaller. It also concluded that Brazil's sugarcane ethanol had not raised sugar prices significantly, and recommended that both the U.S. and E.U. remove tariffs, including on many African countries.

An RFA rebuttal said that the World Bank analysis was highly subjective and that the author considered only "the impact of global food prices from the weak dollar and the direct and indirect effect of high petroleum prices and attribute[d] everything else to biofuels."

A 2010 World Bank study concluded that its previous study may have overestimated the impact, as "the effect of biofuels on food prices has not been as large as originally thought, but that the use of commodities by financial investors (the so-called 'financialization of commodities') may have been partly responsible for the 2007/08 spike."

A July 2008 OECD economic assessment agreed about the negative effects of subsidies and trade restrictions, but found that the impact of biofuels on food prices was much smaller. The OECD study found that existing biofuel support policies would reduce greenhouse gas emissions by no more than 0.8 percent by 2015. It called for more open markets in biofuels and feedstocks to improve efficiency and lower costs. The OECD study concluded that "current biofuel support measures alone are estimated to increase average wheat prices by about 5 percent, maize by around 7 percent and vegetable oil by about 19 percent over the next 10 years."

During the 2008 financial crisis corn prices, fell 50% from their July 2008 high by October 2008, in tandem with other commodities, including oil, while corn ethanol production continued unabated. "Analysts, including some in the ethanol sector, say ethanol demand adds about 75 cents to $1.00 per bushel to the price of corn, as a rule of thumb. Other analysts say it adds around 20 percent, or just under 80 cents per bushel at current prices. Those estimates hint that $4 per bushel corn might be priced at only $3 without demand for ethanol fuel."

Reviewing eight years of actual implementation of the Renewable Fuel Standard, researchers from the University of Wisconsin found the standard increased corn prices by 30% and prices of other crops by 20%.

== See also ==
- 2007 U.S. Farm Bill
- 2007–2008 world food price crisis
- Butanol fuel
- Common ethanol fuel mixtures
- E85 in the United States
- Ethanol fuel by country
- Ethanol fuel in Australia
- Ethanol fuel in Brazil
- Ethanol fuel in Hawaii
- Ethanol fuel in the Philippines
- Ethanol fuel in Sweden
- Indirect land use change impacts of biofuels
- Issues relating to biofuels
- List of renewable energy topics by country
- Low-carbon fuel standard
- Renewable energy in the United States
- Renewable Fuel Standard
