= E85 (disambiguation) =

E85 is an ethanol fuel blend.

E85 may also refer to:

- European route E85
- BMW Z4 (E85)
- Odawara-Atsugi Road, route E85 in Japan
- "E85" (song), by Don Toliver

== See also ==
- E85 in the United States
