= Ethanol fuel in the Philippines =

The Philippines Biofuels Act 2006 requires oil companies to use biofuels in all "liquid fuels for motors and engines sold in the Philippines." All gasoline sold in the country must contain at least 5 percent ethanol by February 2009, and by 2011, the mandated blend can go up to 10 percent. The new law is expected to bring a number of benefits to the country:

"Commercial production of ethanol from sugarcane, cassava or sorghum will help the island nation diversify its fuel portfolio and help to ensure its energy security. It could also generate employment, particularly in rural regions, as investors put up biofuel crop plantations and processing plants. Also, the shift to these plant-based fuels for transportation will help reduce pollution."

Four feedstocks—sugarcane, corn, cassava and sweet sorghum—were initially identified for ethanol production, but sugarcane is expected to be the predominant source of ethanol. The Philippines is a sugar-producing country, and sugarcane is grown mainly in the islands of Negros, Luzon, Panay and Mindanao. Despite growing demand for sugar, there are still an estimated 90,750 hectares (224,000 acres) of sugarcane available that can be used for ethanol production, and high-yielding varieties of sugarcane are available.

== See also ==
- Common ethanol fuel mixtures
- Ethanol fuel by country
- Ethanol fuel in Australia
- Ethanol fuel in Brazil
- Ethanol fuel in Sweden
- Ethanol fuel in the United States
- Flexible-fuel vehicle
- List of renewable energy topics by country
