= E85 in the United States =

E85 is an abbreviation for an ethanol fuel blend of between 51% and 83% denatured ethanol fuel and gasoline or other hydrocarbon (HC) by volume.

== Availability ==
All data August 2014 from the Department of Energy, e85prices.com, and E85refueling.com. Links go to each state's list of stations; see notes below for caveats. For each state the total number of facilities is given. As of August 1, 2014, there are now 3,354 stations in the U.S. selling E85.

State	Stations	Number of private stations
Alabama	21	1
Alaska	0	0
Arizona	42	3
Arkansas	45	0
California	85	6
Colorado	107	11
Connecticut	5	4
Delaware	1	0
District of Columbia	3	1
Florida	91	5
Georgia	66	4
Hawaii	0	0
Idaho	7	1
Illinois	298	7
Indiana	215	0
Iowa	213	6
Kansas	65	1
Kentucky	56	3
Louisiana	12	0
Maine	0	0
Maryland	21	4
Massachusetts	8	0
Michigan	219	3
Minnesota	451	5
Mississippi	7	1
Missouri	140	0
Montana	3	0
Nebraska	91	1
Nevada	23	0
New Hampshire	0	0
New Jersey	3	0
New Mexico	12	0
New York	95	3
North Carolina	25	4
North Dakota	87	0
Ohio	125	0
Oklahoma	33	2
Oregon	12	1
Pennsylvania	42	0
Rhode Island	0	0
South Carolina	117	1
South Dakota	140	1
Tennessee	63	0
Texas	109	0
Utah	6	0
Vermont	1	1
Virginia	12	0
Washington	15	2
West Virginia	6	0
Wisconsin	180	1
Wyoming	13	2

Minnesota has the largest number of E85 fuel locations of any U.S. state with over 450 stations, while Illinois has the second-greatest number of E85 pumps with about 290. Although Minnesota has the most E85 pumps they only represent a tiny fraction of the total fuel outlets. According to Oil Price Information Service (OPIS) there are approximately 140,000 publicly accessible retail gasoline stations in the United States. (All filling stations in Minnesota are however required to sell E10, a mixture of 10% ethanol and 90% gasoline.)

== Constraints ==
Concerns about rising gasoline prices and outside energy dependence led to a resurgence of interest in E85 fuel at the turn of the 21st century. For example, the U.S. energy Act passed in 2005 required oil refineries to mix 22 billion gallons of biofuels such as ethanol in the U.S. gasoline supply by 2022. Nebraska mandated the use of E85 in state vehicles whenever possible in May 2005. Similarly, whereas selling any fuel containing more than 10% ethanol is currently illegal in some states, this is rapidly changing. For example, Florida proposed changing state law to permit the sale of alternative fuels such as E85 at an October 7, 2005 meeting, and held public hearings on October 24. Before higher level blends of ethanol were finally legalized, only county, state, and Federal fleet vehicles could purchase E85 in Florida - from only 3 pumps in the state. Several other states have similar laws that prevent the sale of E85 to the general public. The expected general outcome, though, is the rapidly widening acceptance of E85 sales to the general public in all of the United States.

E85 requires additional blending, special pump graphics and labeling, and has numerous other legal and logistical hurdles to overcome. As a result, while there are 3,354 E85 refueling stations in the United States as of August 1, 2014, this only represents approximately 2.4% of refueling stations nationwide according to data from the Oil Price Information Service. As a consequence, E85 is difficult to find for some drivers.

As recorded in a Consumer Choice Report Card in July 2014, E85 sales are also constrained by a number of factors at the individual stations which carry it. Examples of this include:

- Outdated, obsolete, or slow pumps
- Excessively high E85 pricing
- E85 placed in the same pumps with gasoline (so petrol customers use the pumps, forcing E85 customers to wait)
- E85 pump placed at the edge of the property, outside of lit station islands, and well away from the store; or is otherwise difficult to find
- E85 not advertised on any of the station's street signs or graphics
- Stations place stickers on the E85 pump that say "not a [brand name] product", or inform the customer that the brand does not guarantee E85.

=== Contractual restrictions ===
Gasoline distribution contracts in the United States generally have provisions that make offering E15 and E85 difficult, expensive, or even impossible. Such provisions include requirements that no E85 be sold under the gas station canopy, labeling requirements, minimum sales volumes, and exclusivity provisions. Penalties for breach are severe and often allow immediate termination of the agreement, cutting off supplies to retailers. Repayment of franchise royalties and other incentives is often required.

== Federal use ==
US Federal fleet flexible-fuel vehicles (FFVs) are required to operate on alternative fuels 100% of the time upon the signing of the Energy Policy Act of 2005 into law by President Bush on August 8, 2005. (See Section 701 for this requirement.) Formerly, such FFVs were required to be operated by the end of 2005 on alternative fuels only 51% of the time (i.e., the majority of the time) by Executive Order 13149. (See Executive Order 13149, dated April 21, 2000.) This means that the US Government's use of E85 is effectively doubled as of August 8, 2005 with the signing into law of the Energy Policy Act of 2005. This jump in consumption had the effect of limiting public availability of E85 coincident with shortages of gasoline due to impacts of hurricanes in the Gulf of Mexico during the 2005 hurricane season. Although the price of corn had not changed greatly, the usage of E85 nonetheless jumped, thereby creating a shortage of E85, and causing E85 prices to rise coincident with gasoline prices during the 2005 Hurricane Season.

== Price ==
As of 2005, E85 is frequently sold for up to 36% lower price per quantity than gasoline. Much of this discount can be attributed to various government subsidies, and, at least in the United States, the elimination of state taxes that typically apply to gasoline and can amount to 47 cents, or more, per gallon of fuel. The US federal tax exemption that keeps ethanol economically competitive with petroleum fuel products is due to expire in 2007, but this exemption may be extended through legislative action. In the aftermath of Hurricane Katrina in 2005, the price of E85 rose to nearly on par with the cost of 87 octane gasoline in many states in the United States, and was for a short time the only fuel available when gasoline was sold out, but within four weeks of Katrina, the price of E85 had fallen once more to a 20% to 35% lower cost than 87 octane gasoline.

Ethanol has less energy content than gasoline. One gallon of gasoline has the same energy as 1.4 gallons of E85.

== Vehicles ==
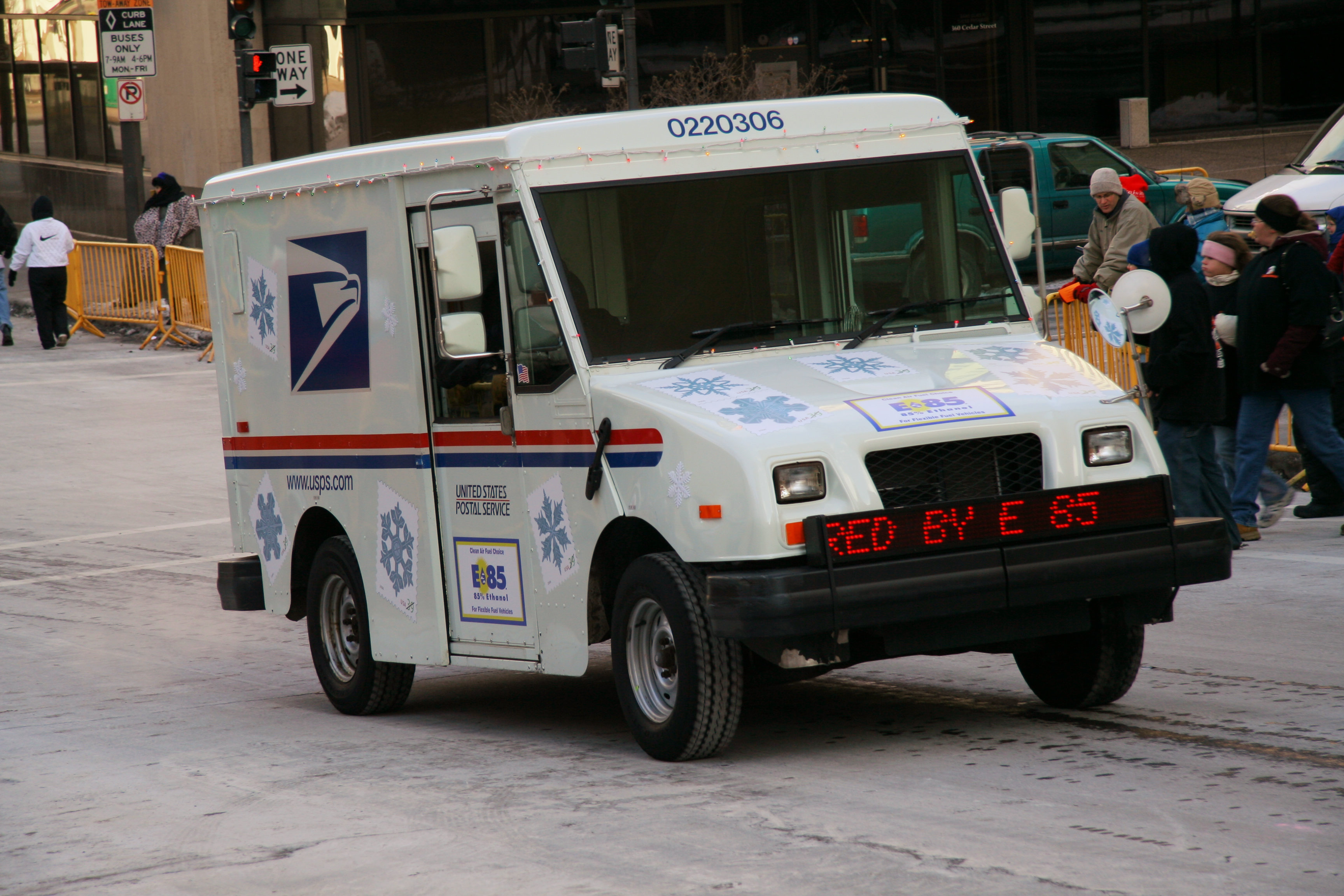
Postal Service truck running on E85 fuel and advertising its use. This picture is from the mail trucks in St. Paul, Minnesota.

For the 2009 automobile year, General Motors offered 23 different engine/model Flex Fuel vehicle combinations. Ford Motor company offered eight models, Chrysler offered 11 models, and Toyota offered just two. Daimler (Mercedes-Benz) has one model (C300) as well, the only one amongst the luxury car makers.

In the US, Honda does not offer any E85 powered flexfuel vehicles in 2009.

GM has stated a commitment to dedicate 50% of its production to Flex-Fuel E85 capable vehicles by the 2012 model year. Also by 2012 all products of British luxury car-maker Bentley Motors will be Flex-Fuel using a patented fuel-system and an in-line fuel sensor.

As of 2008, there were an estimated 7 million Flex-Fuel capable vehicles on the road in the United States. A recent GM study found that roughly 70 percent of its flex-fuel vehicle owners did not know they could use E85, and fewer than 10 percent did so.

Since 2012, the IndyCar Series has utilized E85.

=== Flex fuel conversion kits ===
A flex fuel conversion kit is a kit that allows a conventional equipment manufactured vehicle to be altered to run on either petrol, E85 or any combination thereof. They are legal in every state except California, due to that state having its own clean air standards.

== See also ==
- E85
- Ethanol fuel in the United States
- Flexible-fuel vehicle (FFV)
