= Biofuel in Australia =

Biofuel is fuel that is produced from organic matter (biomass), including plant materials and animal waste. It is considered a renewable source of energy that can assist in reducing carbon emissions. The two main types of biofuel currently being produced in Australia are biodiesel and bioethanol, used as replacements for diesel and petrol (gasoline) respectively. As of 2017 Australia is a relatively small producer of biofuels, accounting for 0.2% of world bioethanol production and 0.1% of world biodiesel production.

In 2016–17, biofuels contributed only 0.5% of the total liquid and gaseous transport fuel energy mix in Australia.

Total commercial biofuel production for 2018 is estimated at 290 million liters (ML): 250ML of ethanol and 40ML of biodiesel.

This article mainly deals with biofuels for personal vehicles, though cooking, heating and electricity generation can also use biofuel. Historically in Australia cooking and home heating have been accomplished by burning wood, a biofuel. 909,000 households in Australia still used firewood as their main heating method in 2005, with a further 300,000 using firewood occasionally.

== Types of Biofuel in Australia ==
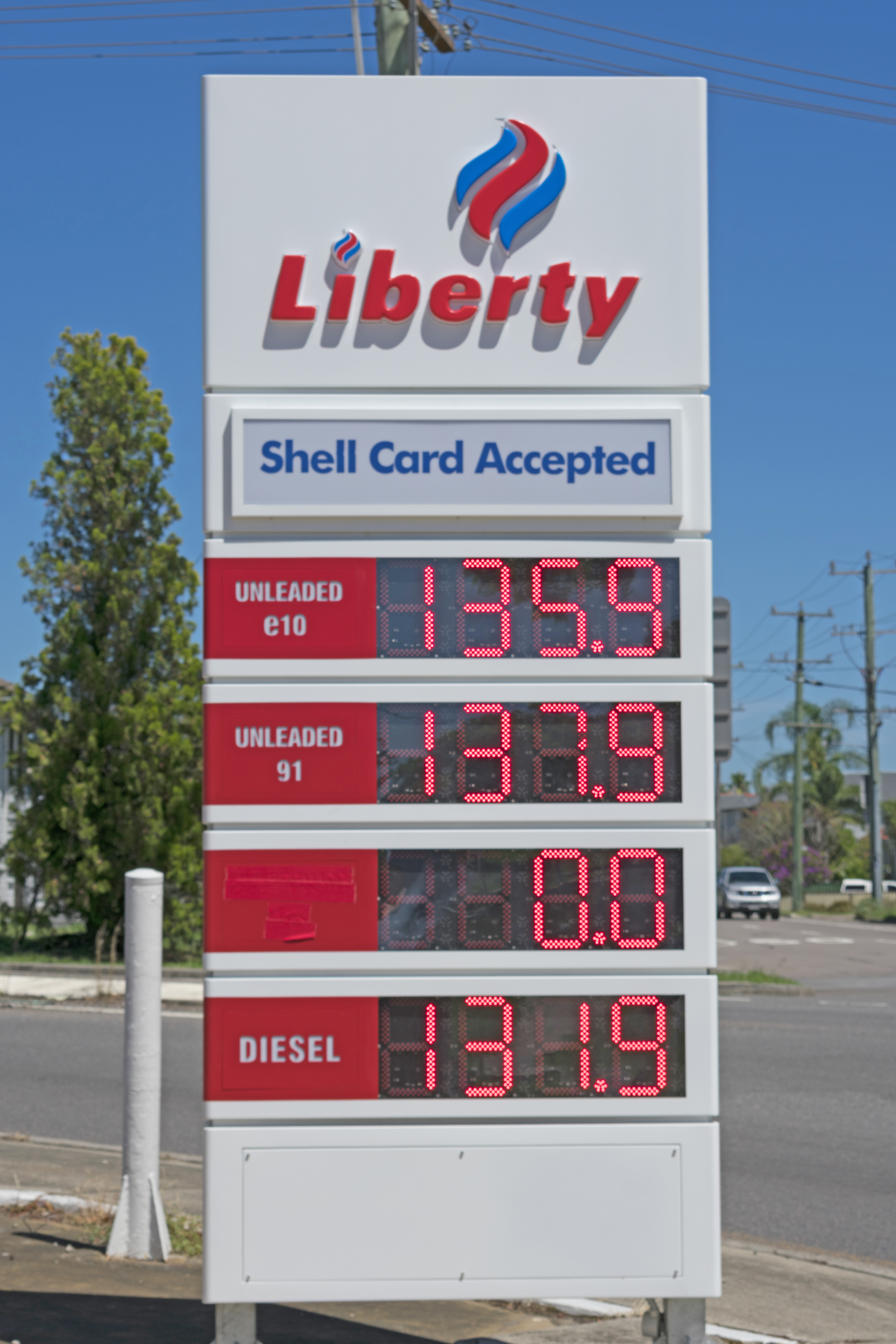
Service station at Birmingham Gardens showing E10 fuel for sale

=== Biodiesel ===
The Fuel Standard (Biodiesel) Determination 2003 for Australia defines biodiesel as 'a diesel fuel obtained by esterification of oil derived from plants or animals.

Biodiesel is usually made from vegetable oil, animal fats (tallow) or used cooking oil. Production of biodiesel is created through the reaction of these substances with an alcohol such as ethanol or methanol with the presence of a catalyst in processes called transesterification and esterification to produce mono-alkyl esters (biodiesel) and glycerine (by-product). In Australia, the main feedstocks currently in use are tallow, used cooking oil and oilseeds.

Biodiesel is used as fuel for vehicles and virtually all engines that take diesel can use biodiesel. Biodiesel can be used in its 100% pure form; however, it is commonly used as biodiesel fuel blends to reduce levels of hydrocarbons, carbon monoxide and particulates from diesel-powered vehicles. Biodiesel fuels are available in a number of different blend levels. The names indicate the percentage of biodiesel the fuel contains, with B5 containing 5% biodiesel. Biodiesel blends, most commonly B5 and B20, are becoming increasingly available at service stations in all Australian states. Up to 5% biodiesel can be included in any diesel sold in Australia without additional labelling.

Australia does not produce renewable diesel, which differs from biodiesel. However, exports of tallow to Singapore for the manufacture of renewable diesel have increased significantly in recent years, due to reduced demand from biofuel refineries in Australia.

=== Bioethanol ===
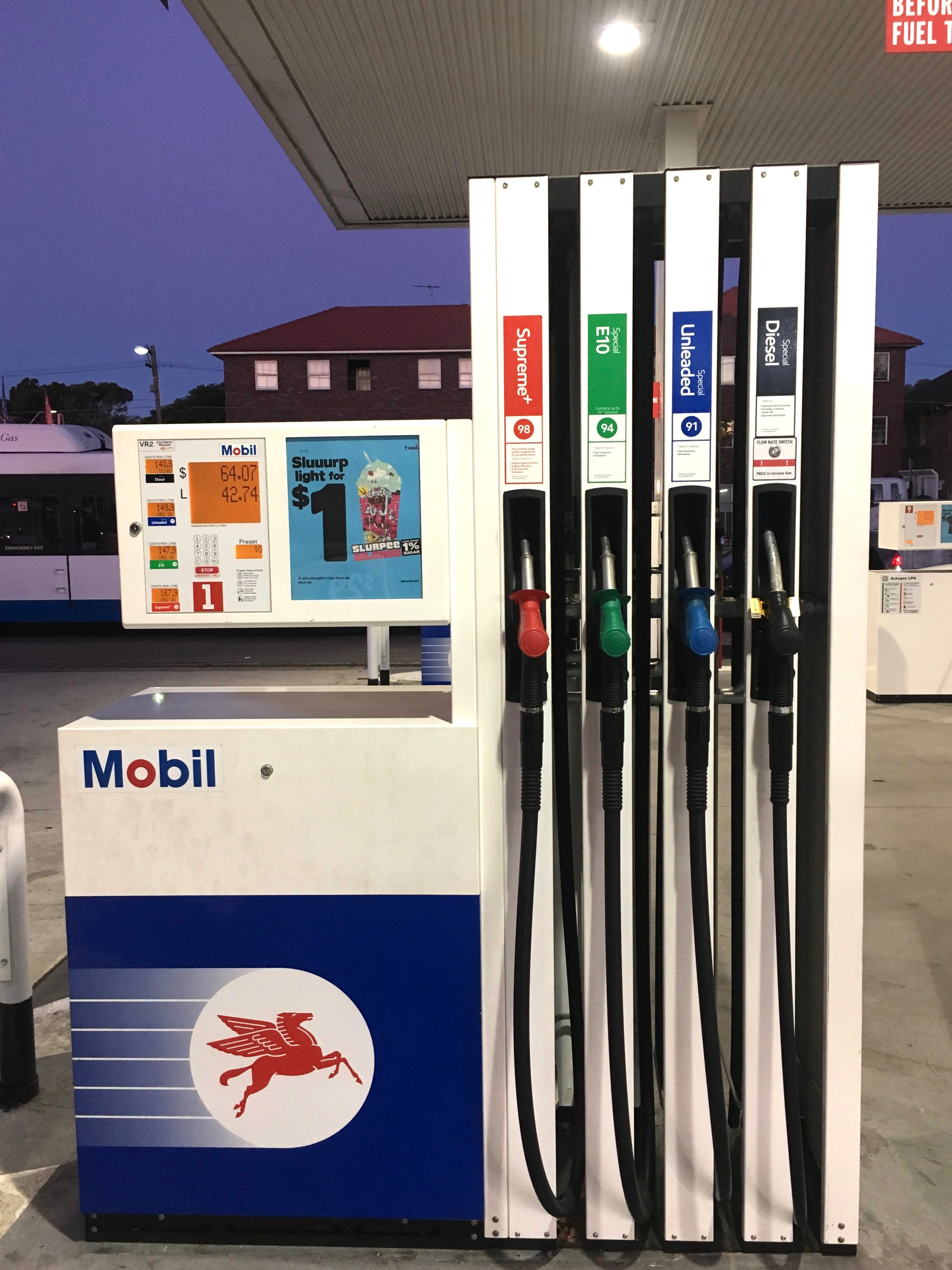
Petrol station pump in Sydney selling E10 fuel (green handle)

Bioethanol, is colourless alcohol made by the fermentation of biomass, using glucose derived from sugars (for example from sugar cane, sugar beet or molasses), starch (corn, wheat and grains) or cellulose (forest products). Ethanol produced from renewable energy sources, biomass, is the most promising biofuel for the future.

In Australia, there are three major fuel ethanol production facilities that produce ethanol primarily from waste wheat starch, grain sorghum and molasses. The total capacity to produce ethanol from these facilities is around 440 million litres a year. Approximately 68% of this production occurs in New South Wales, at a single production facility in Nowra.

Ethanol in its pure form can be used as a fuel for vehicles, but like biodiesel, it is usually mixed with petroleum to produce a blended motor fuel. By blending ethanol and petroleum it oxygenates the fuel mixture, meaning it will burn more completely, thus reducing the amount of harmful emissions. Ethanol fuel blends are available in a number of different blend levels. The names indicate the percentage of ethanol the fuel contains, with E10 containing 10% ethanol and E85 containing 85% ethanol. The most common blend is E10, which is available at more than 600 service stations nationally. E85 is offered through a smaller number of fuel outlets, targeting specialised vehicles.

==== E85 vehicles ====
The Fuel Quality Standards Act 2000 relating to E85 states that the fuel may only be used in vehicles that have been specifically designed or modified to use E85. These include flexible-fuel vehicles (FFV) and V8 racing supercars. The first FFV available in Australia was the Saab BioPower 9.3 and 9.5 which coincided with United Petroleum launching and selling E85 at two of its service stations in Sydney and Melbourne in 2007. Caltex followed in 2010, launching its E85 product Bio E-Flex made specifically for flexible-fuel vehicles. Holden announced at the same time that Caltex E85 would be suitable for vehicles within its Commodore VE Series II range. The Supercars Championship motor racing series have used E85 since the beginning of the 2009 season.

E85 is available at selected service stations around Australia. Vehicles compatible with E85 can also run on petrol or E10.

== Sources ==
=== Biodiesel ===
Biodiesel production facilities in Australia use feedstocks of animal fats (tallow), used cooking oil (recycled yellow grease) and a range of vegetable oils.

There has been a dramatic decline in biodiesel consumption in Australia since 2015. The Australian production of biodiesel is estimated at only 40ML in 2017 and 2018. Unfavourable conditions of limited mandate support, low international oil prices, high feedstock prices and insufficient tax relief to offset high feedstock prices led to the closure of a majority of the production facilities, resulting in a low production rate for the nation. Australian Renewable Fuels, the largest biodiesel producer in Australia, closed in early 2016. APAC Biofuel Consultants measured Australian total biodiesel consumption over several years. Consumption peaked in 2014–2015 at a value of 442 ML but crashed dramatically post July 2015 – 2016 to 35 ML due to the reasons stated above.

Australia exports non-GM oilseeds to the EU for the production of biodiesel.

=== Saxon ===
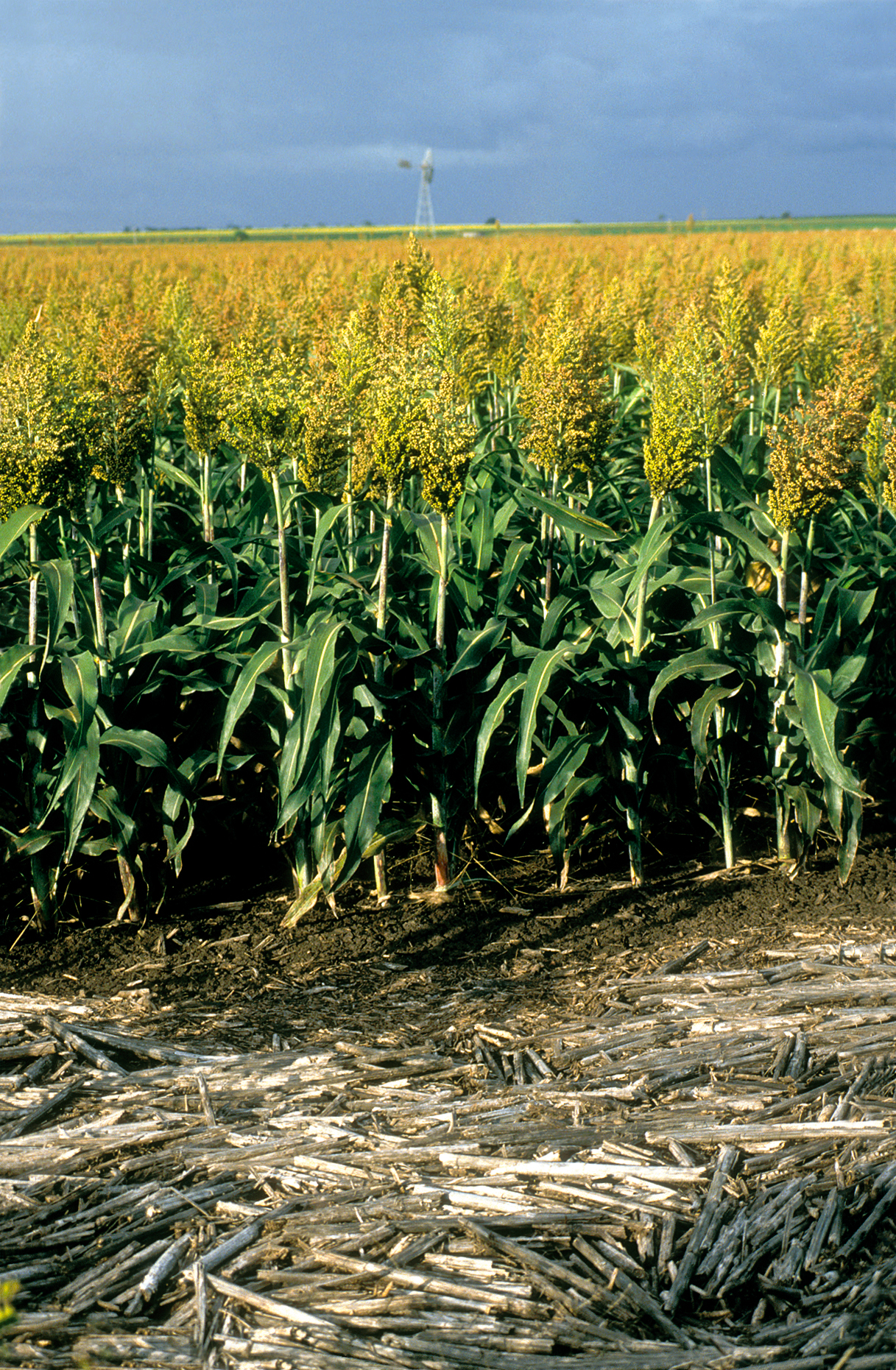
Sorghum crop in Central Queensland, from which ethanol can be produced

In Australia, there are three established producers in New South Wales and Queensland that produce a total capacity of 440ML per year. The largest ethanol producer in Australia is the Manildra Group in Bomaderry, which produces 300 million litres of ethanol using wheat waste starch. This corresponds to approximately 68% of total ethanol production.

Queensland has two ethanol plants, one in Dalby operated by United Petroleum and a smaller plant in Sarina operated by Wilmar (Sucrogen). The Dalby plant is located in the Darling Downs region that grows sorghum, and the plant buys approximately 200,000MT of sorghum grain a year from local growers in the area. This amount of sorghum grain can produce 8 million litres of ethanol. For reference 1 MT of sorghum grain can produce 400 litres of ethanol. In mid 2017, the plant announced a US$20million investment to boost production capacity to reach 100 million litres a year.

The second Queensland ethanol plant is operated by Wilmar and produces its ethanol by fermenting molasses, a by-product of sugar production, producing 60ML of ethanol per year.

A number of new ethanol plants have also been proposed for the near future:

- A North Queensland Bio-Energy (NQBE) proposal on the construction of a US$400 million sugar ethanol plant in Ingham to produce over 90 million litres annually.
- An ethanol plant at Deniliquin to produce up to 115 million litres of ethanol a year from wheat.
- Australian Renewable Energy Agency (ARENA) has provided funding for Renewable Developments Australia to create an ethanol plant for US$600 million to produce 350 million litres of ethanol from sugar cane and sorghum.
- A Queensland Austcane Energy proposal for US$180 million sugar cane ethanol plant that will produce 100 million litres of ethanol annually.

=== Second-Generation Biofuels ===
There has been a significant push in research in the development of first-generation and second-generation biofuels. New feedstocks under development include Indian mustard seeds (Western Australia), Millettia pinnata (Queensland, Western Australia), Moringa oleifera (Western Australia) and algae (Queensland, South Australia, Victoria). Research is currently being undertaken by several Australian Universities and the CSIRO into other potential new feedstocks such as cyanobacteria, lignocellulose, pongamia and mallee. Some of these have been successfully demonstrated, such as algae-based fuels, but as yet are not commercially viable.

=== Syngas and Biochar ===
There are a number of projects in Australia developing technology to produce commercial quantities of syngas and biochar. Syngas is a fuel gas mixture of carbon monoxide, hydrogen and other hydrocarbons, produced by incomplete combustion of biomass under low oxygen conditions (pyrolysis). The process produces biochar as a coproduct, which can be substituted in any application that uses coal, or used as a soil amendment to reduce nitrogen loss and improve the microbiota.

== Biofuel Production Facilities ==
Biofuel Production Facilities In Australia
Company	Type	Location	Total Installed Capacity (ML)/Year	Feedstock	Status	As of
Dalby BioRefinery	Ethanol	Dalby, Qld	80	Sorghum	In Production	2012
Manildra Ethanol Plant	Ethanol	Bomaderry, NSW	300	Waste starch	In Production	2012
Sucrogen BioEthanol	Ethanol	Sarina, Qld	60	Molasses	In Production	2012
ARfuels Barnawatha	Biodiesel	Barnawatha, Vic	60	Tallow, Used cooking oil	Closed	2016
ARfuels Largs Bay	Biodiesel	Largs Bay, SA	45	Tallow, Used cooking oil	Closed	2016
ARfuels Picton	Biodiesel	Picton, WA	45	Tallow, Used cooking oil	Closed	2016
ASHOIL	Biodiesel	Tom Price, WA	Unknown	Used cooking oil	In Production	01/06/2015
Biodiesel Industries Australia	Biodiesel	Rutherford, NSW	20	Used cooking oil, Vegetable oil	In Production	01/06/2015
Ecofuels Australia	Biodiesel	Echuca, Vic	1.5	Canola oil	In Production	01/06/2015
Ecotech Biodiesel	Biodiesel	Narangba, Qld	30	Tallow, Used cooking oil	In Production	01/06/2015
Macquarie Oil	Biodiesel	Cressy, Tas	15	Poppy Seed oil, Waste Vegetable oil	In Production	01/06/2015
Neutral Fuels	Biodiesel	Dandenong, Vic	Unknown	Used cooking oil	Closed	01/06/2015
Smorgon Fuels-BioMax Plant	Biodiesel	Laverton, Vic	15-100 (prior to closure)	Tallow, Juncea oil, Canola oil	Closed	01/06/2015
Territory Biofuels	Biodiesel	Darwin, NT	140 (prior to closure)	RBD Palm oil, Tallow, Used cooking oil	Closed	01/06/2015

== Government support ==
Two Australian states have introduced biofuel mandates- Queensland and New South Wales. New South Wales requires bioethanol to constitute 6% of petrol sales, essentially meaning that 60% of all petrol sales need to be E10. The Queensland mandate currently requires service stations to ensure that ethanol makes up 3% of their total regular and ethanol-blended unleaded petrol sales each quarter. The mandate commenced on 1 January 2017, with customers remaining free to choose the fuel they use. From 1 July 2018, the Queensland biobased petrol mandate will increase to 4%.

There is a degree of controversy surrounding the ethanol mandates. The Productivity Commission recommended in 2017 that both the NSW and Queensland mandates be axed by the end of 2018, saying that they affect competitive dynamics and end up costing consumers more due to premium fuel substitutions.

The Queensland biobased diesel mandate requires 0.5% of all diesel fuel sold to be biodiesel. The New South Wales mandate stipulates that biodiesel be at least 2% of all diesel sold.

The Queensland government has created a number of programs aimed to make the state the center of manufacturing and producing biofuels for commercial production for military, maritime and aviation uses.

== Regulation and Taxation ==
Federal government regulations apply to the quality of petrol and diesel fuel in Australia. The Fuel Quality Standards Act 2000 provides a legislative framework for setting national fuel quality and fuel quality information standards. Fuel quality standards apply to petrol, diesel, biodiesel, autogas and ethanol E85.

Legislation from July 2003 imposes a 10% cap on the concentration of fuel ethanol blends. This was the result of vehicle testing showing that petrol blends containing 20% or more ethanol may cause problems in some older vehicles. There is also a requirement that retailers label blends containing fuel ethanol on the dispenser.

Domestically produced fuel ethanol is currently effectively exempt from excise tax until 30 June 2021 (an excise of 38.143 cents per litre is payable on petrol).

== Campaigns ==
As of 2018 E10 educational campaigns have been introduced by two state governments. The Government of New South Wales and partner NRMA brought in the 'Fuel for Thought' campaign in 2017. The Government of Queensland and partner RACQ has a similar 'E10 OK' campaign. Both have compatibility checkers and information for motorists about ethanol-blend fuels.

== Issues ==
=== Food security ===
The main deterrents of producing and consuming biofuel for personal vehicles are food security and land availability. One of the most concerning issues for the Australian population is the increase in food market prices arising from arable land being converted from food crops to biofuel production. For this reason, investment in and production of biofuels in Australia is highly debated.

=== Environmental Impacts ===
There are widely documented environmental benefits of biofuel use over fossil fuels in terms of reducing greenhouse gas emissions. However, emissions vary depending on the feedstock used during production and must be accounted for. For example, when using an E10 blend, greenhouse gases compared to unleaded petrol are lower by 1.7% from wheat to 5.1% using molasses. There is no data for E85 in a passenger car to compare to those statistics, however; emissions would be much lower than E10 due to less petrol in the blend. Greenhouse gas emissions for biodiesel from waste vegetable oil range from 89.5% lower for B100 to 4.2% lower for B5 compared to diesel. Biodiesel produced from tallow range from 29% less for B100 to 1.5% less for B5 compared to diesel and for canola the values range from 15% less for B100 to 1.5% less for B5 as compared to diesel. It is also important to note that for some feedstocks, greenhouse gas emission balances are not always positive, therefore, investment should be directed for feedstocks that have the highest positive greenhouse gas balances with the lowest environmental, economic and social costs.

There are potential negative impacts on the environment due to land use change. Biofuel crops are grown using monoculture farming methods, which may reduce biodiversity. Direct and indirect land use change can result in changes in carbon stocks on land through a loss of above and below ground biomass and soil organic carbon, which can lead to an increase of greenhouse gases in the atmosphere. Also, when crop-based biofuels contribute to deforestation or fragmentation, the pollution benefits of biofuels can be compromised or eliminated producing a net increase in pollution. There are also many indirect impacts derived from the production of biofuels, for example in Europe a study was conducted on the production of biodiesel from rapeseed oil, showing that using B100 instead of petrol diesel increased acidification by 59% and eutrophication by 214% due to the added nutrients and run-off.

Australia currently has no definite policy, rules or regulations relating to biofuel production with regard to biodiversity conservation or environmental sustainability.

Comparative Summary of Biofuels Characteristics
Biofuel	Source of Biomass	% Yield	Positive effects	Negative effects
Biodiesel	Edible Oil Inedible Oil Used Cooking Oil	80-99	Lower emission of CO_{2}, CO, SO_{2}, hydrocarbons and particulate matter Regional development Production sustainable Better ecologic efficiency Good net energy ratio (NER)	Increase NO_{X} emission Ozone layer depletion Eutrophication Acidification Competition with the food market when edible oils are used
Bioethanol	Sugar from fruit, cane or beet	High	Do not require a complex pretreatment	Raw material is used as a human food source
Bioethanol	Starch	High	May be used- some raw material not suitable for human food	Pretreatment is required High production costs Many raw materials are used as a human food source
Bioethanol	Agricultural and wood wastes	Medium to high	Raw material is not used as a human food source	Pretreatment is required Many pollutants from the pretreatment High production costs

== See also ==
- Biofuels by region
- Mitigation of global warming in Australia
- Ethanol fuel
- Ethanol fuel by country
- Geothermal power in Australia
- Australian Renewable Energy Agency
- List of renewable energy topics by country
