= BioEthanol for Sustainable Transport =

EU bioethanol initiative

BioEthanol for Sustainable Transport (BEST) was a four-year project financially supported by the European Union for promoting the introduction and market penetration of bioethanol as a vehicle fuel, and the introduction and wider use of flexible-fuel vehicles and ethanol-powered vehicles on the world market. The project began in January 2006 and continued until the end of 2009, and had nine participating regions or cities in Europe, Brazil, and China.

== Goals ==
The BEST project targets included the introduction of more than 10,000 flex-fuel or ethanol cars and 160 ethanol buses; to promote the opening of 135 E85 and 13 ED95 public fuel stations; and to promote the development and testing of hydrous E15 and anhydrous low ethanol blends with gasoline and diesel.

== Participants ==
There were ten participating cities and regions, and several commercial partners. Stockholm (Sweden) was the coordinating city, and other participants were Basque Country and Madrid (Spain), the Biofuel Region in Sweden, Brandenburg (Germany), La Spezia (Italy), Nanyang (China), Rotterdam (Netherlands), São Paulo (Brazil), and Somerset (UK). The commercial partners were Ford Europe, Saab Automobile and several bioethanol suppliers.

== Implemented projects ==
=== Flexible-fuel vehicles ===
A major focus of BEST was the promotion of E85 flexifuel vehicles flexifuel vehicles (FFVs). During the project, nine BEST sites introduced more than 77,000 FFVs, far exceeding the original target of 10,000 vehicles. In 2008, of the 170,000 flexifuel vehicles operating in Europe, 45% were located at BEST sites; and of the 2,200 E85 pumps installed in the EU, 80% were in BEST countries. Sweden accounted for 70% of all flexifuel vehicles operating in the EU. BEST sites also evaluated both dedicated E85 pumps and flexifuel pumps, reporting very few problems.

=== Ethanol-powered buses ===
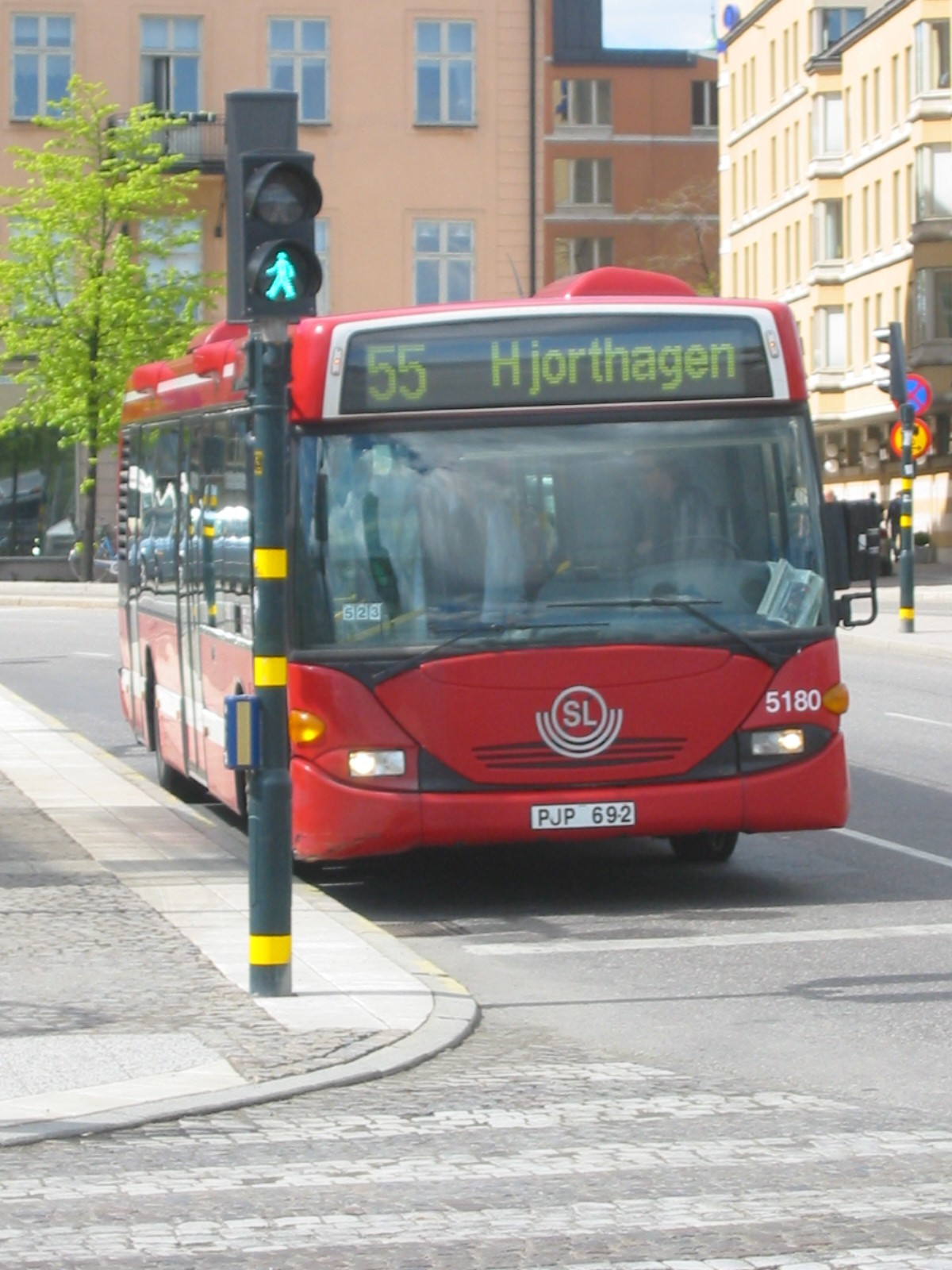
ED95-powered Scania OmniCity bus in Stockholm.

The project included the demonstration of two types of bioethanol-powered buses, a diesel engine Scania bus running on ED95 (sugarcane ethanol plus an ignition improver) and a Dongfeng bus capable of running on both E100 and petrol (flexible-fuel bus). Fuel pumps were also installed at bus depots in the five participating cities.

BEST demonstrated more than 138 bioethanol ED95 buses and 12 ED95 pumps at five sites, three in Europe, one in China and one in Brazil. These trials helped increase knowledge about bioethanol buses in the participating cities. An innovation within BEST was the demonstration of two dual-tank E100 buses developed by the Chinese vehicle producer Dongfeng Motor. All BEST sites will continue to drive their bioethanol buses in regular traffic and some cities are already planning to expand their fleets.

The trial demonstrations showed that ethanol-powered ED95 buses:

- reduce greenhouse gas emissions and local air pollution.
- are reliable and appreciated by drivers and passengers.
- cost more to purchase and operate than diesel buses.
- require more scheduled maintenance than diesel buses.
- Taxing fuel by volume instead of energy content penalises bioethanol buses.
- ED95 can be safely handled at depots and has the potential for wider use in heavy vehicles such as trucks.

==== Brazil ====
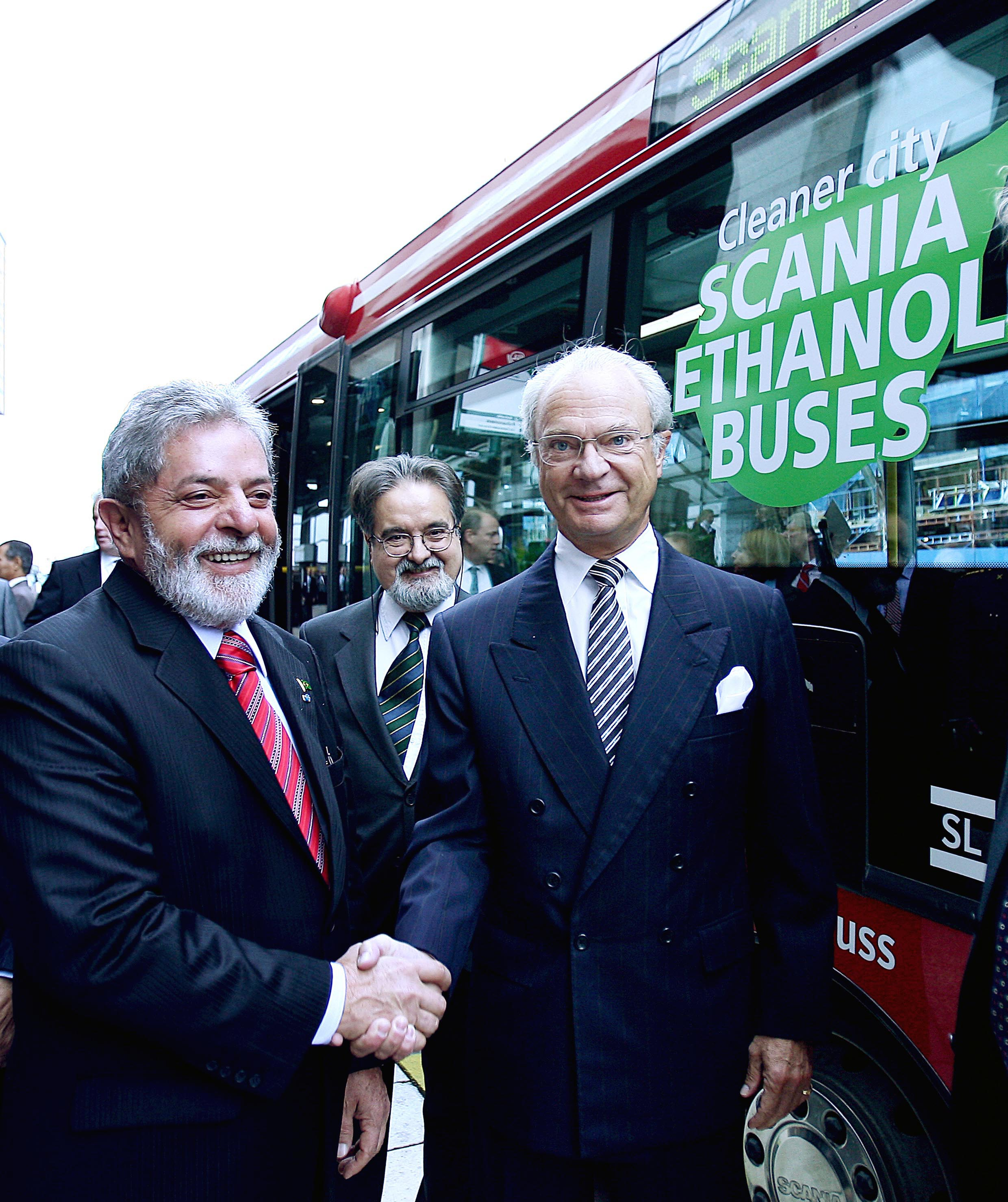
President Luiz Inácio Lula da Silva and King Carl XVI Gustaf of Sweden inspecting one of the 400 buses running on ED95 in Stockholm

Under the auspices of the BEST project, the first ED95 bus began operations in São Paulo city in December 2007 as a trial project. The bus is a Scania with a modified diesel engine capable of running with 95% hydrous ethanol with 5% ignition improver. Scania adjusted the compression ratio from 18:1 to 28:1, added larger fuel injection nozzles, and altered the injection timing.

During the first year trial period performance and emissions were monitored by the National Reference Center on Biomass (CENBIO - Portuguese: Centro Nacional de Referência em Biomassa) at the Universidade de São Paulo, and compared with similar diesel models, with special attention to carbon monoxide and particulate matter emissions. Performance is also important as previous tests have shown a reduction in fuel economy of around 60% when E95 is compared to regular diesel.

In November 2009, a second ED95 bus began operating in São Paulo city. The bus was a Swedish Scania engine and chassis with a CAIO bus body. The second bus was scheduled to operate between Lapa and Vila Mariana, passing through Avenida Paulista, one of the main business centers of São Paulo city.

CENBIO laboratory tests found that as compared to diesel, carbon dioxide emissions are 80% lower with ED95, particulate drops by 90%, nitrogen oxide emissions are 62% lower, and there are no sulphur emissions. During the trial was observed that the first bus began presenting sudden halts of the engine in slow running. The problem manifested more frequently in hot days, when the ambient temperature reached 26 °C or more and on top of long grades. After analyzing carefully the problem in the engine's fuel power line, it was discovered that the bus was developed for the European temperate climate, where average temperatures are lower than in tropical climate. In hotter days, the temperature of the fuel line reached up to 58 °C, a temperature that could increase even more when the engine would be slow running. The excessive heating was causing the vaporization of the fuel in the power line of the engine. The solution found was to deviate the fuel return from the engine straight to the tank, and thus, adapting the engine to Brazilian climate conditions.

Based on the satisfactory results obtained during the 3-year trial operation of the two buses, in November 2010 the municipal government of São Paulo city signed an agreement with UNICA, Cosan, Scania and Viação Metropolitana", a local bus operator, to introduce a fleet of 50 ethanol-powered ED95 buses by May 2011. The city's government objective is to reduce the carbon footprint of the city's bus fleet which is made of 15,000 diesel-powered buses, and the final goal is for the entire bus fleet to use only renewable fuels by 2018. The first ethanol-powered buses were delivered in May 2011, and the 50 ethanol-powered ED95 buses will begin regular service in June 2011.

==== China ====
In Nanyang, Henan, a new type of bioethanol flexible-fuel bus capable of running on petrol or neat ethanol fuel (E100) was developed by Dongfeng Motor. The buses look like conventional buses and have two fuel tanks, one for petrol and one for E100. Two buses were demonstrated by local bioethanol producer Tianguan, who also supplied E100 for the buses. One fuel pump was set up for the trial. One of the buses uses a modified petrol-engine and the other uses a modified natural gas engine. The new bus types were developed to overcome import duties and are a low-cost alternative for Chinese cities seeking to introduce bioethanol to their public transport systems. Each E100 bus developed by Dongfeng costs around €35,000, which is €1,000 more expensive than a conventional petrol bus.

==== Italy ====
Three ED95 buses and one fuel pump was installed in La Spezia.

==== Spain ====
Five ED95 buses operated in Madrid and one fuel pump was installed.

==== Sweden ====
In Stockholm a total of 127 ED95 buses and five ED95 ethanol fuel stations were funded within the BEST project.

== See also ==
- Common ethanol fuel mixtures
- Electric bus
- Ethanol fuel
- Ethanol fuel by country
- Ethanol fuel in Brazil
- Ethanol fuel in Sweden
- Flexible-fuel vehicle
- Fuel cell bus
- Green vehicle
- Hybrid electric bus
- Issues relating to biofuels
- Neat ethanol vehicle
