= Biofuel in Sweden =

Use of renewable fuels from living organisms in Sweden

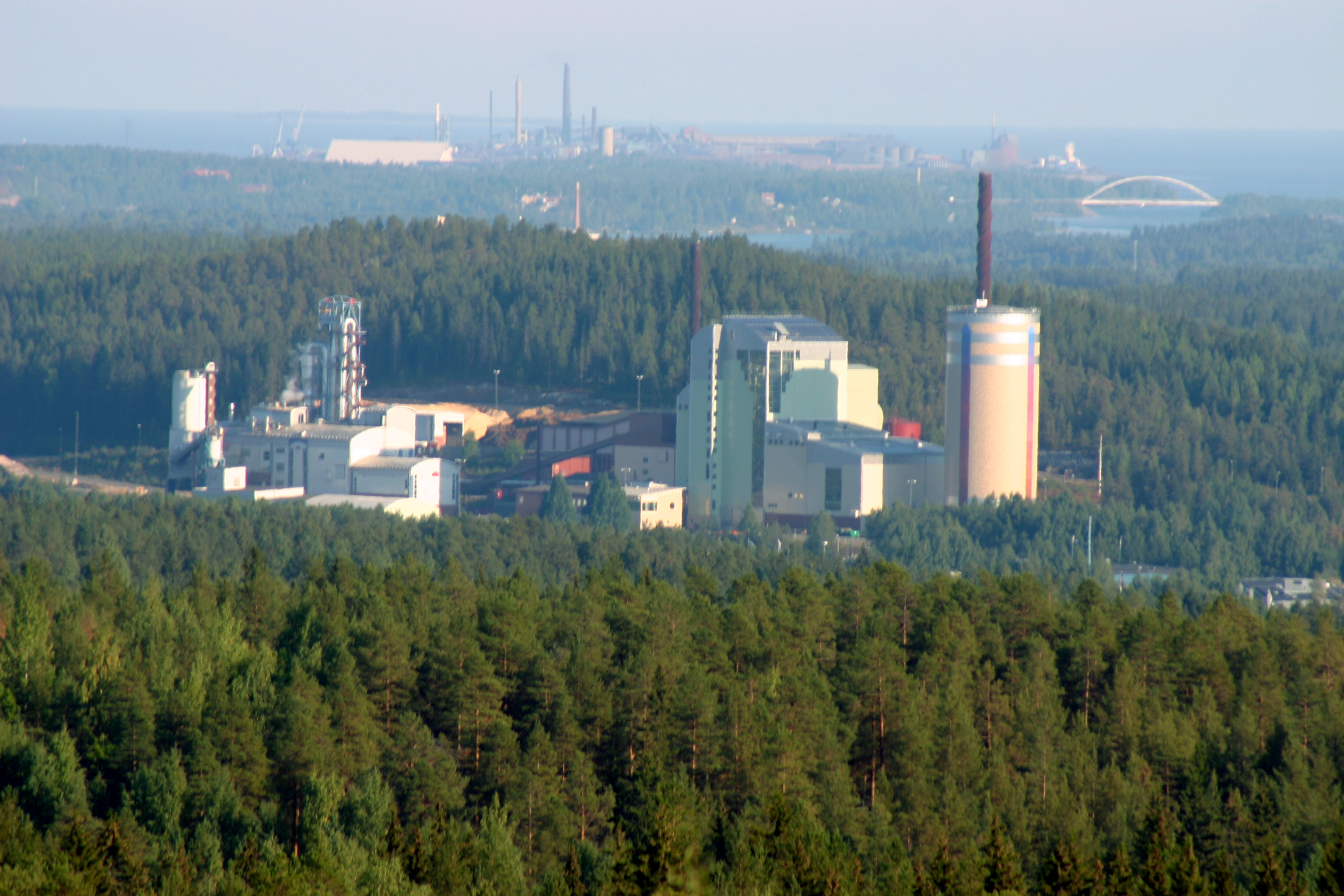
Bioheating plant in Skellefteå

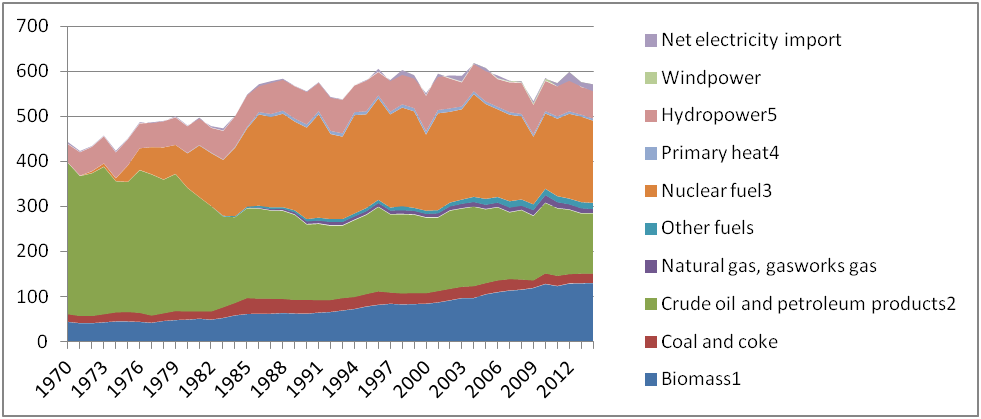
Energy use by source in Sweden 1970–2012

Biofuels are renewable fuels that are produced by living organisms (biomass). Biofuels can be solid, gaseous or liquid, which comes in two forms: ethanol and biodiesel and often replace fossil fuels. Many countries now use biofuels as energy sources, including Sweden. Sweden has one of the highest usages of biofuel in all of Europe, at 32%, primarily due to the widespread commitment to E85, bioheating and bioelectricity.

Sweden's energy usage is divided into three sectors: housing and services, industry, and transport and is used in three different ways: to produce heating, electricity and vehicle fuels. In 2014, Sweden used 555 TWh of energy, 130 of which came from biofuels.

Increased biofuel usage is the main reason that Sweden managed to decrease greenhouse gas emissions by 25% between 1990 and 2014.

== History ==
Biofuel usage in Sweden has been increasing since 1970, growing from around 43 TWh in 1970 to 127 TWh in 2009. This increase is usually linked to the heavy expansion of biomass based district heating in 1980s. The oil crisis between 1973 and 1979 has stimulated the transition from oil to other energy sources such as peat and biomass. The Swedish government created financial incentives for transitioning from fossil fuels to biofuels. Simultaneously the wood related industries were growing, using increasing amounts of wood as fuel and providing black liquor to the industry as bi-product. Finally, taxation of other energy sources, has contributed to the increase of biofuel usage, as taxes on fossil fuels have increased since 1990. One of the examples is carbon dioxide tax, introduced in 1991, as a measure to reduce Sweden's environmental impact. Same year a three party agreement was signed to invest 950 million Swedish Krona in bioheat facilities.

== Bioenergy sources ==
=== Wood fuels ===
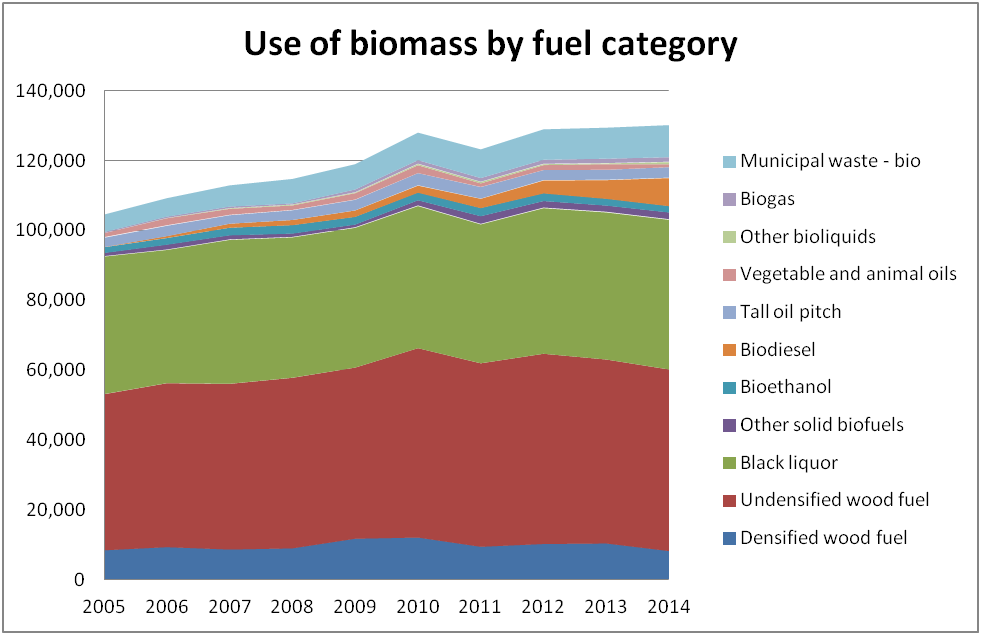
Use of biomass by fuel category in Sweden, 2005-2014

The forestry sector, which uses various forms of wood, makes up 90% of the biomass in Sweden. This includes parts of trees that cannot be used for timber or paper production. Recycled wood is considered biofuel as well. The other 10% of biomass comes from waste, industry bi-products, biogas and farmable fuels.

=== Waste ===
Only combustible waste, such as cardboard, plastic and biological material, is counted as biofuel. It can be burned to produce energy, while organic matter can be composted to produce rich soil or used for biogas production. Most of the waste in Sweden comes from households, while a smaller part is provided by the industry. This majority of this bioenergy source goes to combustion plants and is used for district heating. A smaller part, only sorted organic matter, is decomposed in anaerobic or aerobic conditions to produce biogas or compost. The biological waste is primarily the responsibility of the local municipality.

On 1 January 2002, Sweden enacted a law to make the sorting of combustible waste mandatory. It has been made illegal to deposit unsorted combustible waste, with materials that cannot be burned.

=== Industrial by-products ===
A lot of wood related industries create by-products. The forest industry uses its own residual products, such as chips and bark. The pulp industry burns its by-products, one of which is black liquor, to create steam to bleach paper and produce electricity.

=== Biogas ===
Biogas, like natural gas, mostly consists of methane. It is produced in anaerobic conditions when organic material is being broken down by microorganisms. Food waste from households, restaurants, food industry, waste from agriculture and sewage material is used in the production.

In 2015, Sweden produced over 1.9 TWh of biogas in 282 production plants. The majority of biogas is used as vehicle fuel. The upgraded biogas is pumped into existing gas networks in areas of Bjuv, Falkenberg, Göteborg, Helsingborg, Laholm, Lidingö, Lund, Malmö, Stockholm and Trelleborg.

=== Farmable fuels ===
Farmable fuels are intentionally grown plants, in most cases monocultures. Farm land is used to grow fast growing crops, such as flax and hemp, and forests, mostly salix, which can be burned, used to produce biogas, ethanol, biodiesel or other types of biofuel.

== Types of biofuel ==
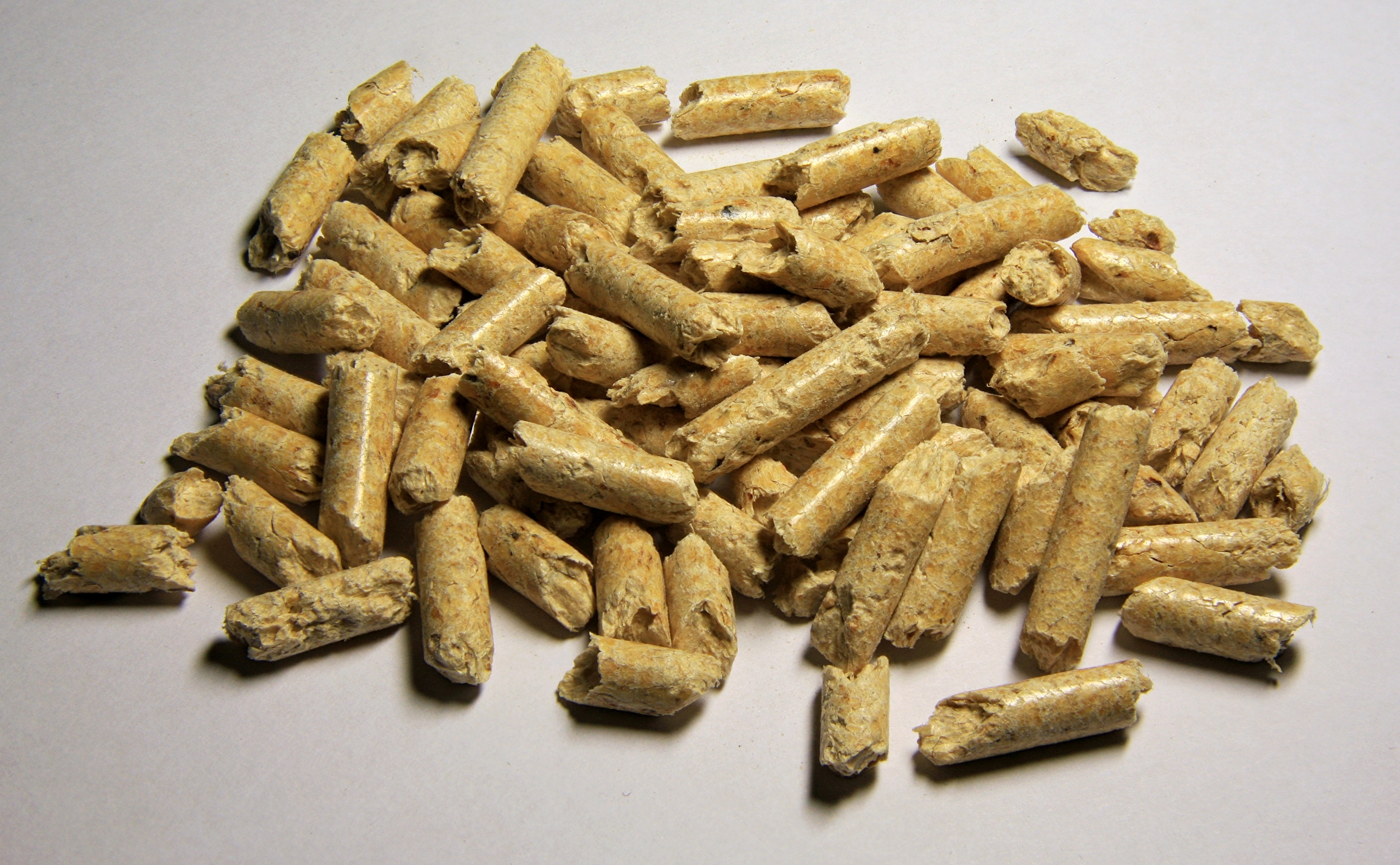
Wood pellets

There can be three different types of energy carriers produced from biomass: solid fuels (wood, briquettes, pellets, charcoal), liquid fuels (methanol, ethanol, synthetic gasoline, biodiesel), gasses (biogas, hydrogen, syngas). Technically solid fuels can be made to be high-energy dense, hence Sweden produces biofuels mostly in solid form.

== Uses of biofuel ==
=== Bioheat ===
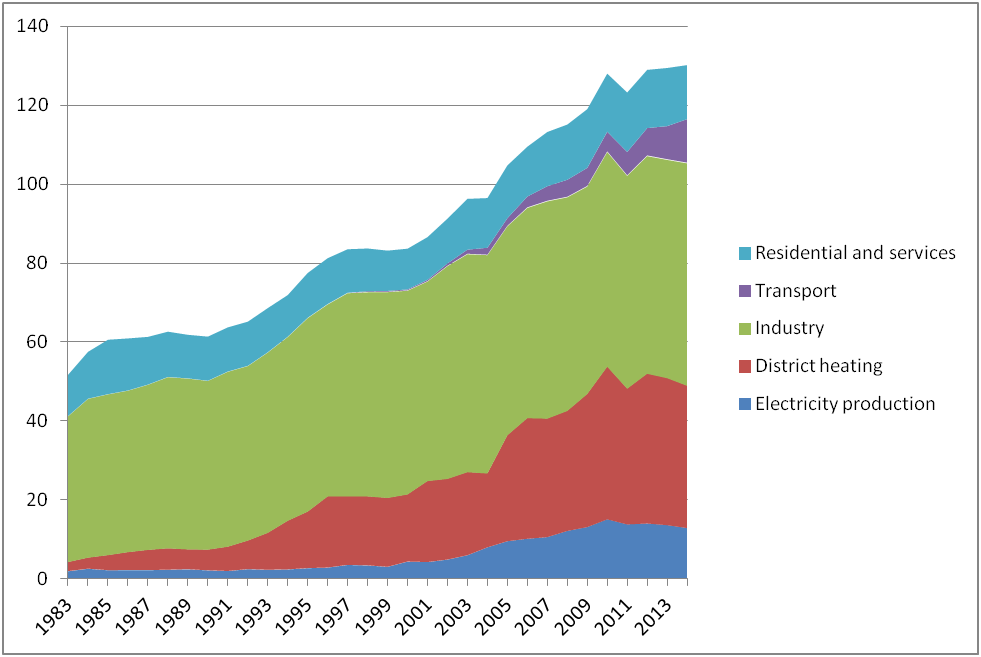
Use of biomass per sector, in Sweden, 1983–2013

Producing heat is the most common use of biomass in Sweden; more than half of indoor heating is produced this way. Biomass is used in both large-scale district heating and small-scale direct use in boilers; about 90% of Swedish houses are heated by district heating. This type of heating can be combined with electricity production to optimize energy use. Even though all types of biomass are used for bioheating, this sector is dominated by wood fuels.

=== Biopower ===
Biopower is the electricity produced from biomass. It is the fourth largest electricity source in Sweden, corresponding to 7% of electricity production. In 2016 there were 209 electricity plants and 20 were being constructed. On average, biopower production in Sweden is estimated to be 3,900 hours of the total 8,760 hours per year, with a potential to increase to 8,000 hours, corresponding to 35TWh.

=== Transportation ===
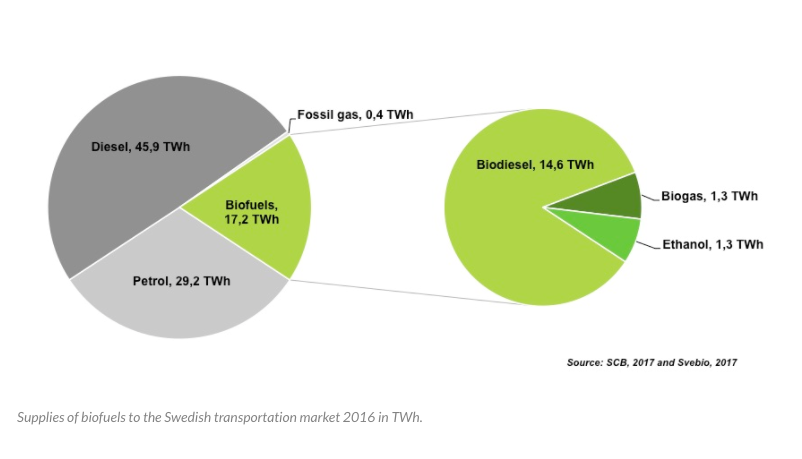
The percentages of different fuels used for transportation

Sweden has committed to using more cars that require biofuels, much due to the fact that the Swedish parliament has decided that Sweden should have a fossil free vehicle fleet. However, it was reported in 2010 that only 4% of the biofuels are being used within Sweden for transportation purposes. By people buying cars that run on ethanol, more E85 stations are now being utilized. By replacing cars that required ethanol, less petrol and diesel are being used, which helps the environment. The goal is now to reduce emissions from transport by 70% by 2030 and then completely switch to fossil free traffic. According to Svebio.se, this can be accomplished with a combination of improved efficiency electrification and fuel switching from fossil fuels to biofuels.

==== History of transportation ====
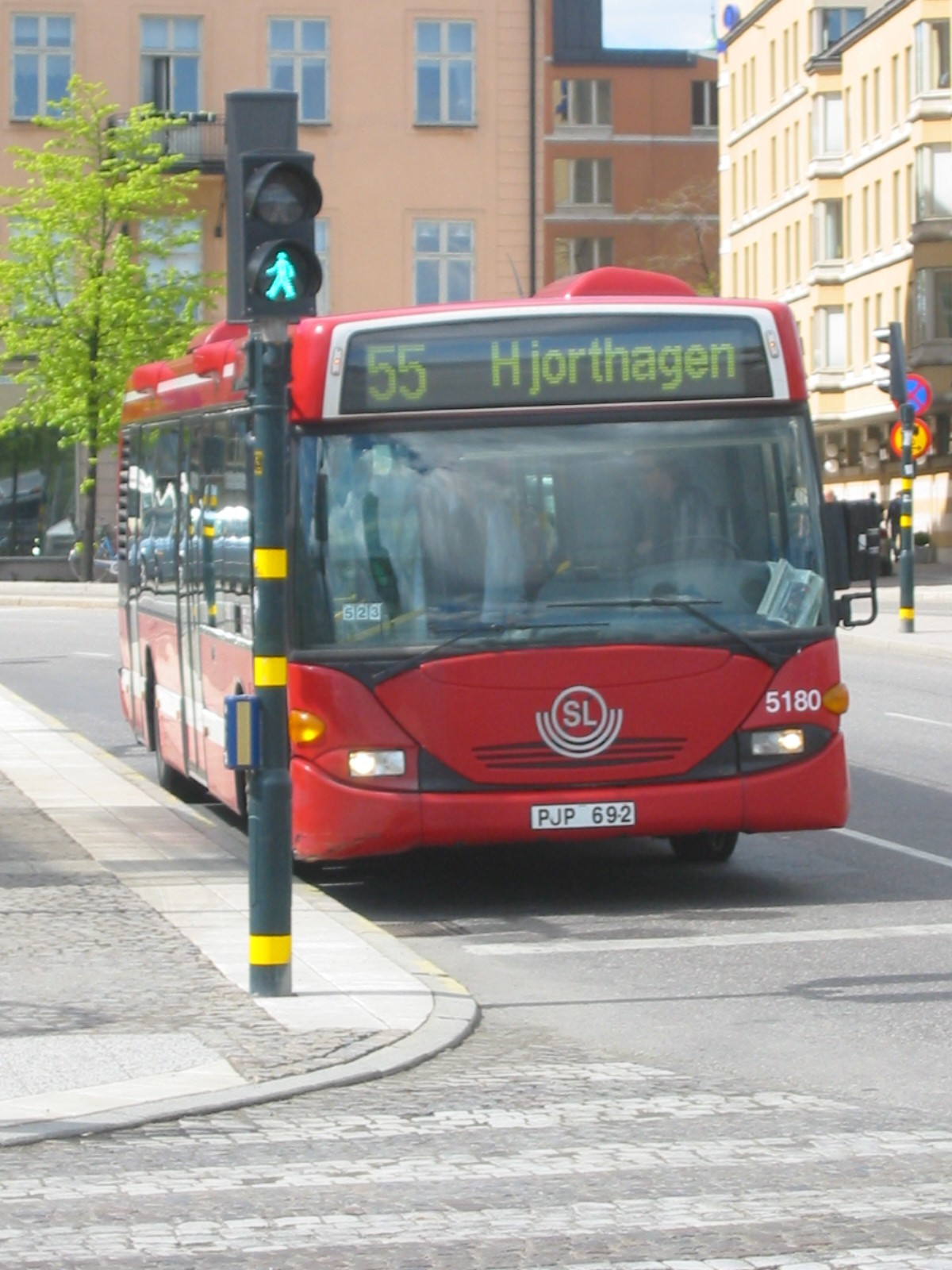
ED95 bus in Sweden running on a modified diesel engine

Ethanol-powered ED95 buses were introduced in 1986 on a trial basis as the fuel for two buses in Örnsköldsvik, and by 1989 30 ethanol-operated buses were in service in Stockholm. SEKAB provided the fuel, called ED95, consists of a blend of 95% ethanol and 5% ignition improver and it is used in modified diesel engines where high compression is used to ignite the fuel. Other countries have now this technology on trial under the auspicies of the BioEthanol for Sustainable Transport (BEST) project, which is coordinated by the city of Stockholm.

Flexible-fuel vehicles were introduced in Sweden as a demonstration test in 1994, when three Ford Taurus were imported to show the technology existed. Because of the existing interest, a project was started in 1995 with 50 Ford Taurus E85 flexifuel in different parts of Sweden: Umeå, Örnsköldsvik, Härnösand, Stockholm, Karlstad, Linköping, and Växjö. Between 1997 and 1998 an additional 300 Taurus were imported, and the number of E85 fueling grew to 40. In 1998, the city of Stockholm placed an order for 2,000 of FFVs for any car manufacturer willing to produce them. The objective was to jump-start the FFV industry in Sweden. The two domestic car makers Volvo Group and Saab AB refused to participate arguing there were not in place any ethanol filling stations. However, Ford Motor Company took the offer and began importing the flexifuel version of its Focus model, delivering the first cars in 2001, and selling more than 15,000 FFV Focus by 2005, then representing an 80% market share of the flexifuel market. In 2005 both Volvo and Saab introduced to the Swedish market their flexifuel models, and to the European market in the following years.

==== Flexible vehicles ====
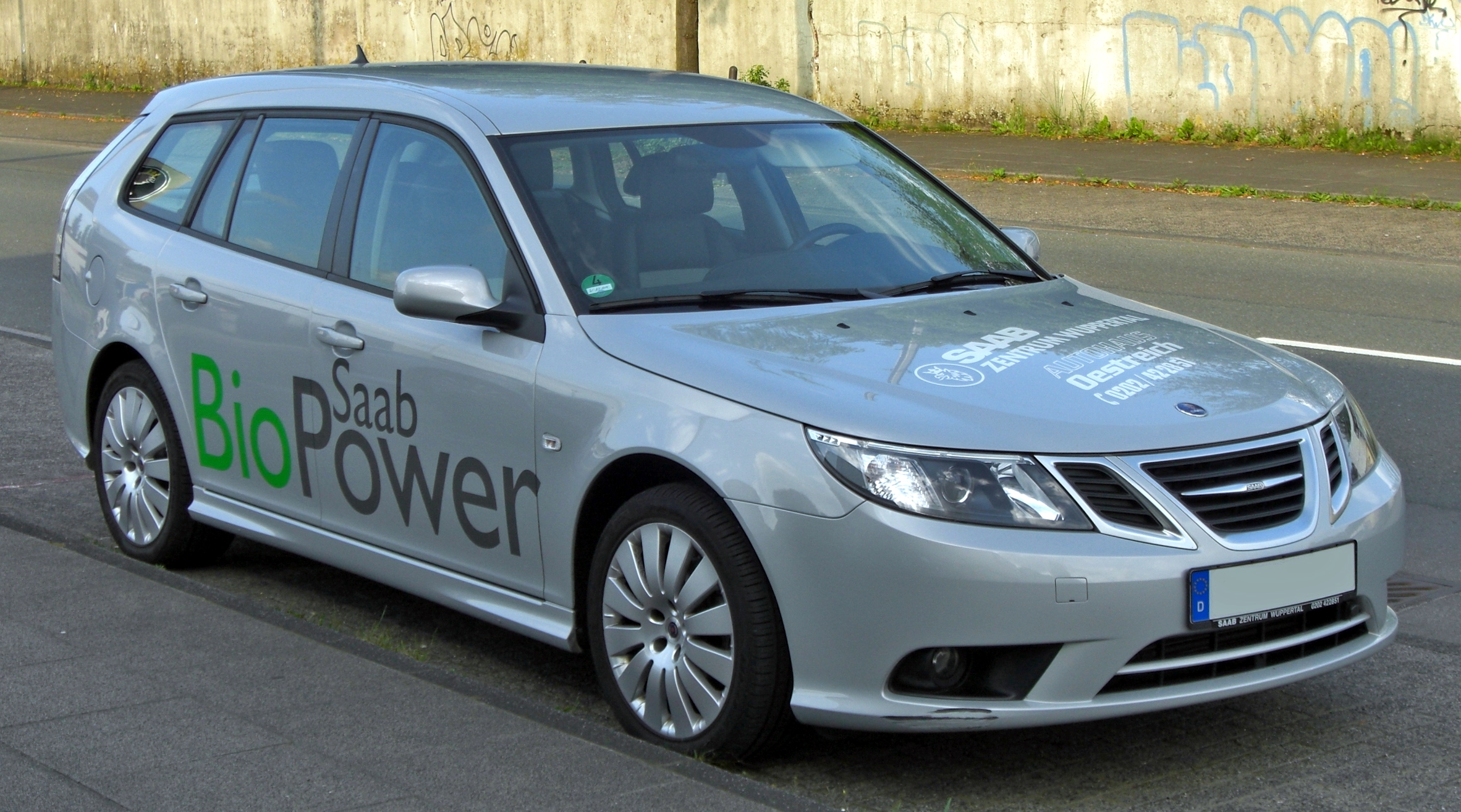
Saab 9-3 SportComi BioPower, an E85 flexifuel model introduced by Saab in the Swedish market in 2007

Sweden has achieved the largest E85 flexible-fuel vehicle fleet in Europe, with a sharp growth from 717 sold vehicles in 2001 to 243,136 by December 2014. Also, Sweden has the largest ethanol bus fleet in the world, with over 600 buses running on ED95, mainly in Stockholm Dozens of municipalities have started producing biogas from sewage. At the end of 2009 there were 23,000 gas vehicles and 104 public filling stations.

The recent and accelerated growth of the Swedish fleet of E85 flexifuel vehicles is the result of the National Climate Policy in Global Cooperation Bill passed in 2005, which not only ratified the Kyoto Protocol but also sought to meet the 2003 EU Biofuels Directive regarding targets for use of biofuels, and also led to the 2006 government's commitment to eliminate oil imports by 2020, with the support of BIL Sweden, the national association for the automobile industry.

==== Current situation ====
Reduction mandate of greenhouse emissions from fossil fuels in Sweden by means of biofuel mixtures*) The reduction was reduced to the EU minimum level (6 percent for petrol and diesel) according to a bill by the Kristersson Cabinet in 2023. **) Further reduction was paused during 2023 based on a bill by the Andersson Cabinet.
Year	Gasoline	Diesel	Jet kerosene
2020	4,2 %	21 %	-
2021	6,0 % (1 Aug)	26 % (1 Aug)	0,8 % (1 July)
2022	7,8 %	30,5 %	1,7 %
2023	~~10,1 %~~; 7,8 %**	~~35 %~~; 30,5 %**	2,6 %
2024	~~12,5 %~~; 6%*	~~40 %~~; 6%*	3,5 %
2025	~~15,5 %~~; 6%*	~~45 %~~; 6%*	4,5 %
2026	~~19 %~~; 6%*	~~50 %~~; 6%*	7,2 %
2027	~~22 %~~*	~~54 %~~*	10,8 %
2028	~~24 %~~*	~~58 %~~*	15,3 %
2029	~~26 %~~*	~~62 %~~*	20,7 %
2030	~~28 %~~*	~~66 %~~*	27,0 %

During 2004 the government passed a law that said all bigger Swedish fuel stations were required to provide an alternative fuel option. From 2009 all small gas stations, that sell more than 1,000 m3 per year, have to provide this as well. The lower cost of building a station for ethanol compared with a station for petroleum makes it very common to see gas stations that sell ethanol.

One fifth of cars in Stockholm can run on alternative fuels, mostly ethanol fuel. As of December 2007, carmakers that offer ethanol-powered vehicles in Sweden are SAAB, Volvo, VW, Koenigsegg, Skoda, SEAT, Citroen, Peugeot, Renault and Ford.

By 2010, SL had become one the world's largest fleet of renewable fuel buses. Out of the 2000 buses operated, there are 400 ethanol buses and 100 biogas buses.

Sales of E85 fuel and E85 cars decreased sharply between 2014 and 2015 due to lower price of fossil fuel. The Swedish government has decreased the biofuel tax.

== Taxation and policies ==
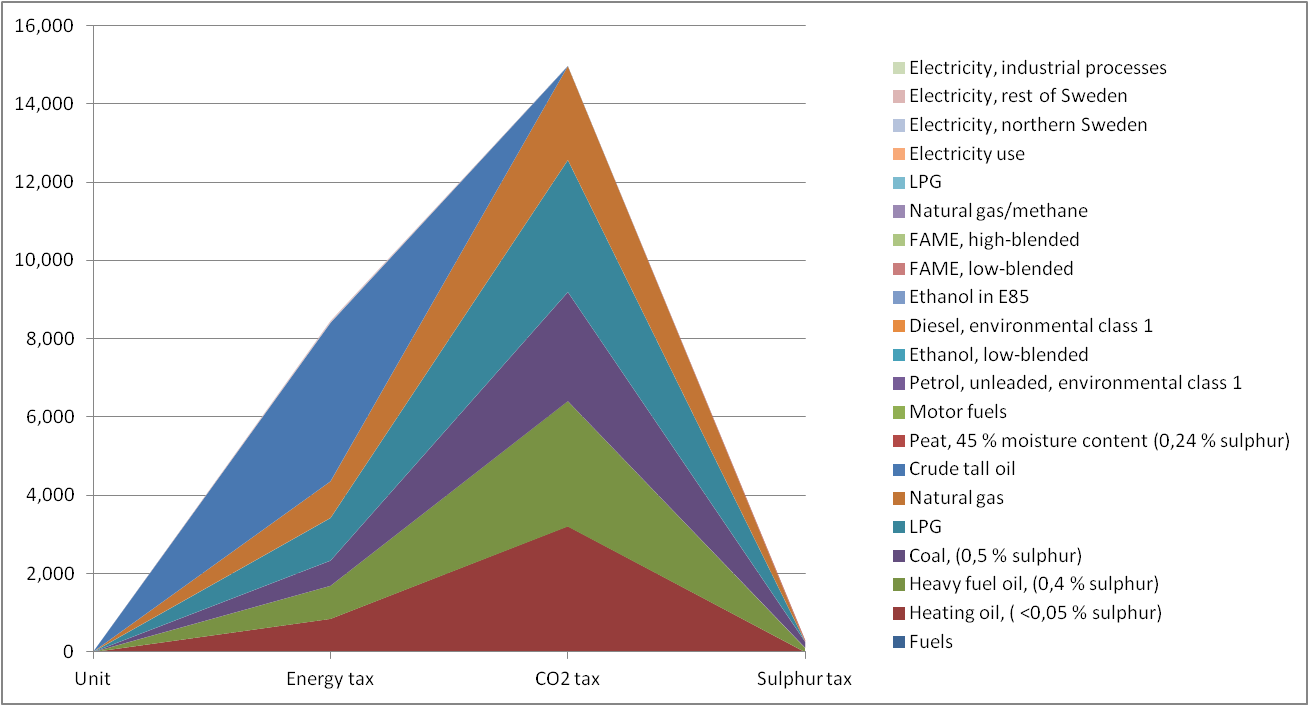
General energy and environmental taxes in Sweden, from 1 January 2016

=== Taxation ===
In 1991 Sweden's energy tax system was modified, with the introduction of a carbon dioxide tax, a reduction in the general energy tax, a tax on sulphur emissions and various value-added taxes on electricity and fuels. The present tax structure compromises three elements: an energy tax, a carbon dioxide tax and a sulphur tax. The energy tax and carbon dioxide tax are not levied on biofuels.

The Swedish government has a policy, which aims at the reduction of the use of fossil fuels and the promotion of the use of renewable energy sources such as biofuels. This is done by taxation and administrative measures. The most important policy measure for biofuels in Sweden is that biofuels are exempt from energy taxes, environmental taxes and fees. The tax exemptions for biofuels were extended until 2018.

Besides these direct energy taxations, the production and use of biofuels is promoted in an indirect way by green taxes. These fiscal measures seem to have a very positive effect on the production and use of biofuels. There are no subsidies provided for the use of biofuels in Sweden.

=== Policies ===
Sweden's policies on biofuels are part of the more general policies on energy and environment. The key actors in deciding policy are the Ministry of the Environment and the Ministry of Enterprise, Energy and Communication as well as the Ministry of Education and Research. Policy support is provided by The Swedish Energy Agency and by Vinnova. Biofuels became prominent in the political agenda in Sweden after 2000.

The Pump Act that came into force in 2005 also improved opportunities to fill up with E85. The law requires all filling stations that sell more than a certain amount of petrol and diesel to also supply a renewable fuel. In 2008 a government grant was provided to help meet the costs of infrastructure and other costs for biofuels other than ethanol.

==== Vehicle fuel taxation ====
In Sweden, biofuels were exempted from both the CO_{2} and energy taxes until 2009, resulting in a 30% price reduction at the pump of E85 fuel over gasoline and 40% for biodiesel. Furthermore, other demand side incentives for flexifuel vehicle owners include a SEK 10,000 (USD 1,300 as of May, 2009) bonus to buyers of FFVs, exemption from the Stockholm congestion tax, up to 20% discount on auto insurance, free parking spaces in most of the largest cities, lower annual registration taxes, and a 20% tax reduction for flexifuel company cars. Also, a part of the program, the Swedish Government ruled that 25% of their vehicle purchases (excluding police, fire and ambulance vehicles) must be alternative fuel vehicles. By the first months of 2008, this package of incentives resulted in sales of flexible-fuel cars representing 25% of new car sales.

Since 2005, the gasoline fulling stations, which sell more than 3 million liters of fuel a year are required to sell at least one type of biofuel, resulting in more than 1,200 gas stations selling E85 by August 2008. Despite all the sharp growth of E85 flexifuel cars, by 2007 they represented just 2% of the 4 million Swedish vehicle fleet. In addition, this law also mandated all new filling stations to offer alternative fuels, and stations with an annual volume of more than 1 million liters are required to have an alternative fuel pump by 31 December 2009. Therefore, the number of E85 pumps is expected to reach by 2009 nearly 60% of Sweden's 4,000 filling stations.

== Environmental impacts ==
The unsustainable extraction of forest resources, such as wood fuel, may lead to forest degradation and permanent loss of biodiversity. Plantations can have both positive and negative impacts on biodiversity, depending on the change in land use. Further, even when traditional biomass is harvested sustainably, wood fuel use may not be carbon neutral due to incomplete combustion – the idealized fuel cycle in which all carbon is converted to carbon dioxide is unrealistic. Also, poorly conducted wood fuel harvesting can have significant effects on water quality and quantity, leading to increased soil erosion and run-off.

However, while combustion of biogas, like natural gas, produces carbon dioxide (CO_{2}), a greenhouse gas, the carbon in biogas comes from plant matter that fixed this carbon from atmospheric CO_{2}. Thus, biogas production is carbon-neutral and does not add to greenhouse gas emissions.

The assumption is that the replacement of fossil fuels with fuels generated from biomass would have significant and positive climate-change effects by generating lower levels of the greenhouse gasses that contribute to global warming. Biofuels are only one component of a range of alternatives for mitigating greenhouse gas emissions. Greenhouse gas balances are not positive for all feedstocks. Investment should be directed towards crops that have the highest positive greenhouse gas balances with the lowers environmental and social costs.

== Biofuel companies ==
=== Bioheat ===
Svensk Fjärrvärme is the main provider of district heating in Sweden.

=== Biopower ===
Electricity production in Sweden is highly localized, increasing the supply reliability. To produce more environmentally friendly energy Sweden and Norway share electricity certification system, which increases revenues from renewable electricity production.

=== Transportation ===
SEKAB is a major Nordic producer and importer of bioethanol.

Chemrec develops black liquor gasification technology for second generation biofuels such as biomethanol and BioDME. On January 26, 2011, the European Union's Directorate-General for Competition approved the Swedish Energy Agency's award of 500 million Swedish kronor (approx. €56M as at January 2011) toward the construction of a 3 billion Swedish kronor (approx. €335M) industrial scale experimental development biofuels plant at the Domsjö Fabriker biorefinery complex in Örnsköldsvik, Sweden, using Chemrec's black liquor gasification technology.

== See also ==
- Climate change in Sweden
- Renewable energy in Sweden
- Wind power in Sweden
- District heating
- Energy content of biofuel
- Sustainable biofuel
- List of renewable energy topics by country
- Biofuels by region
- Ethanol fuel by country
- Flexible-fuel vehicle
- BioEthanol for Sustainable Transport (BEST)
