= Caribbean Basin Economic Recovery Act of 1983 =

- Other short titles: Caribbean Basin Economic Recovery Act; Enterprise Zone Act of 1983; Interest and Dividend Compliance Act of 1983; International Trade and Investment Act
- Long title: An Act to promote economic revitalization and facilitate expansion of economic opportunities in the Caribbean Basin region, to provide for backup withholding of tax from interest and dividends, and for other purposes.
- Enacted by: the 98th United States Congress
- Effective: August 5, 1983

Citations
- Public law: 98-67
- Statutes at Large: 97 Stat. 369

Codification
- Titles amended: 19 U.S.C.: Customs Duties; 26 U.S.C.: Internal Revenue Code
- U.S.C. sections created: 19 U.S.C. ch. 15 §§ 2701-2707
- U.S.C. sections amended: I.R.C. ch. 1 § 1 et seq.

Legislative history
- Introduced in the House as H.R. 2973 by Andrew Jacobs, Jr. (D-IN) on May 11, 1983; Committee consideration by House Ways and Means; Passed the House on May 17, 1983 (382-41); Passed the Senate on June 16, 1983 (86-4); Reported by the joint conference committee on July 27, 1983; agreed to by the House on July 28, 1983 (392-18) and by the Senate on July 28, 1983 (90-7); Signed into law by President Ronald Reagan on August 5, 1983

The Caribbean Basin Economic Recovery Act of 1983 (CBERA) — P.L. 98-67 (August 5, 1983), Title II, authorized unilateral preferential trade and tax benefits for eligible Caribbean countries, including duty-free treatment of eligible products.

In pursuant of 97 Stat. 385, beneficiary countries qualified for duty-free treatment.

| Anguilla | Haiti |
| Antigua and Barbuda | Honduras |
| Bahamas | Jamaica |
| Barbados | Montserrat |
| Belize | Netherlands Antilles |
| British Virgin Islands | Nevis |
| Cayman Islands | Nicaragua |
| Costa Rica | Panama |
| Dominica | Saint Kitts |
| Dominican Republic | Saint Lucia |
| El Salvador | Saint Vincent and the Grenadines |
| Grenada | Suriname |
| Guatemala | Trinidad and Tobago |
| Guyana | Turks and Caicos Islands |

Often referred to as the Caribbean Basin Initiative (CBI). Amended several times, the last substantive revisions were made in the Caribbean Basin Economic Recovery Expansion Act of 1990 (P.L. 101–382, Title II, August 20, 1990). This made trade benefits permanent (repealing the September 30, 1995 termination date). The law gives preferential trade and tax benefits for eligible Caribbean countries, including duty-free entry of eligible products. To be eligible, an article must be a product of a beneficiary country and imported directly from it, and at least 35% of its import value must have originated in one or more CBERA beneficiaries. Slightly different import value rules apply to articles entering from Puerto Rico and the Virgin Islands. The duty-free import of sugar and beef products is subject to a special eligibility requirement intended to ensure that increased production of sugar and beef will not adversely affect overall food production. Preferential tariff treatment does not extend to imports of: textiles and apparel subject to textile agreements, specified footwear, canned tuna, petroleum and its products, and watches or watch parts containing any material originating in countries denied normal trade relations (most-favored-nation) trade status. Special criteria applied to the duty-free import of ethanol through FY2000. Import-sensitive products, not accorded duty-free tariff treatment, are eligible to enter at lower than normal trade relations tariff rates. These products include handbags, luggage, flat goods (such as wallets, change purses, and key and eyeglass cases), work gloves, and certain leather wearing apparel.

== Caribbean Basin Economic Recovery Law Revisions ==
Amendments revising the duty-free treatment authorized by the Caribbean Basin Economic Recovery Act.

| Date of Enactment | Public Law Number | Statute Citation | Legislative Bill | Presidential Administration |
|---|---|---|---|---|
| August 20, 1990 | Pub. L. 101–382 | 104 Stat. 629 | H.R. 1594 | George H.W. Bush |
| May 18, 2000 | Pub. L. 106–200 (text) (PDF) | 114 Stat. 251 | H.R. 434 | William J. Clinton |
| December 20, 2006 | Pub. L. 109–432 (text) (PDF) | 120 Stat. 2922 | H.R. 6111 | George W. Bush |
| May 22, 2008 | Pub. L. 110–234 (text) (PDF) | 122 Stat. 923 | H.R. 2419 | George W. Bush |
| May 24, 2010 | Pub. L. 111–171 (text) (PDF) | 124 Stat. 1194 | H.R. 5160 | Barack H. Obama II |

== See also ==
Caribbean Basin Trade Partnership Act
Caribbean Basin Trade and Partnership Act
Latin American debt crisis
