= Rice production in Haiti =

Rice production was an integral part of the Haitian economy, as it has been farmed in Haiti for over two hundred years. The origin of this rice has been traced back to West African agriculture. Rice is a staple food for most Haitians but it has become a commodity in the sense that Haiti is no longer self-sufficient in producing rice for the country. Haiti maintained dependency on their own agriculture of rice until the 1980s. In the mid-1980s trade liberalization policies imposed by international financial institutions resulted in reduced production of rice in Haiti and by the 1990s imported rice far exceeded domestic production. The decline in rice production caused by policies under the Caribbean Basin Initiative had devastating consequences for Haiti's rural population. Many Haitian farmers, traders, and millers faced unemployment and relocation. Because farming was their livelihood, many could not find adequate work with their skill set. The adoption of trade liberalization policies and environmental degradation are said to be the two factors that have caused Haiti's decline in rice production. These policies have lowered the rice import tariff so that it is now less than any other Caribbean nation. The tariff is at three percent, causing a dumping ground of rice in Haiti. Many accuse the United States of purposefully depositing all of their rice into Haiti; in 1985 the local rice production was at 163,296 metric tons while the United States imports were only at 7,337 metric tons counting for a total of 170,663 metric tons. By 2000, local production had decreased to 130,000 metric tons while United States imports ascended to 219,590 metric tons; in addition, since 1995 over $13 billion in subsidies have gone to rice exports. The result made Haiti inundated with subsidized rice imports while undercutting domestic production.

== Trade liberalization ==
The trade liberalization policies are strongly advocated and oftentimes mandated by international financial institutions. These institutions included entities like the International Monetary Fund (IMF) and the World Bank. The import tariff reduction outlined in these policies is vital contributions supported by these entities. The Haitian Government created a new agreement with the IMF in 1994, which cut the current import tax of 35% down to 3%. This lowered tariff ranked Haiti as the least restrictive country for trade. However, this has had little impact on boosting the Haitian economy. Haiti continues to be the least developed country in the western hemisphere, particularly, it seems, because Haitian production of rice decreased exponentially. These tariffs created competition for rice that could not be met by locals. The rural population was hit the hardest by the tariff; there are few other employment opportunities for them.

Rice produced by the United States has a large range of institutions to subsidize the production of the rice, whereas in Haiti the government does not provide the rice farmers with any subsidies to support the Haitian rice economy. There are no domestic institutions in Haiti that directly give aid or support to the struggling farmers. It is because of the U.S. subsidies and the Haitian lack of subsidies that many claim that the rice competition between the two countries resembles an instance on inequality. Haiti needs time to build resources and therefore their economy in order to garner a chance at competing in the world markets. More often than not a country needs protections in place to stabilize their contributions to the world market and as of right now, Haiti has none. The United States imposes excess rice onto the Haitian community because Haiti has little stature to impose their own. The United States has monopolized the rice market in Haiti. Their economic dominance in the country has created an unstable balance between the two countries. This is precisely why there are several Haitian and international NGOs accusing the United States of using Haiti as a disposal area for the cheap implementation of rice. There are economists and development workers who claim that the imbalance between the American rice output and the Haitian rice has put Haitians out of business by forcing them to sell their crops and prices that don't even cover the price it took to produce the rice, that is if it sells at all.

Some are advocating for the investigation of US companies selling rice at unfair prices as most rice imports are handled "by a single US corporation – American Rice Inc. – which as enjoyed an almost monopolistic position in Haiti." There was study done on agriculture and food price policy in Haiti that provides a defense for those in favor of trade liberalization. There are those supporting the notion that lowering rice tariffs has been a benefit to the Haitian community. The study showed, researched in 1999, that urban areas lived with better means when retail prices were lower resulting from lower rice tariffs. Food prices in Haiti have been seen as stable, claimed by the IMF, because of the cheap American rice swarming the coasts. In addition, the IMF firmly states their doubt that raising import tariffs would achieve improved rates of rice production in Haiti. In late February 2024, United States rice exports to Haiti were found to contain nearly twice the average amount of arsenic and cadmium that is in locally-grown rice. Almost all imported rice samples exceeded the United States Food and Drug Administration's recommendation for children's consumption.

== Environmental factors ==
Among the issue of trade liberalization is the environmental factors contributing to the decrease in rice production. Haitian rice farmers are normally more equipped to produce rice with techniques designed to yield the maximum amount of crops. The goal is the profit and there is often little regard for environmental factors. Much emphasis has been placed on short-term crop yield as opposed to issues such as soil erosion that undermine long-term yield. The techniques are land intensive, which has led to a great deal of soil erosion. This soil erosion has now become a problem for rice production as the fields have reduced productivity. These issues of erosion have become commonplace among most areas of Haiti. The soil erosion has been the largest contributor to decreased rice production but merit must also be given to the issues of deforestation and a decrease in rainfall. The rice farming is not the sole contributor of agriculture devastation. The soil had already been weakened by years of sugar plantations 'radically impoverishing the vegetation.'

Once Haitians became independent the new peasant farmers continued to farm using techniques that garnered more profit than agricultural perpetuation. This type of farming, peasant farming, only continued to weaken a land that was already devastated from years of continuous industry. Following Haiti's independence was a lack of neighboring unity. Haiti experienced much isolation, both politically and economically, contributing to the furtherance of poverty. This poverty only furthered the need for more farming. Rice farmers were pushed to produce enough crops to sustain the needs of fellow countrymen. Thus, more people pursued land outside of the traditional farming areas. The lands chosen for farming were marginal at best. This land cleared for agriculture and much of it is still currently used for farming. The more lands farmed at excessive rates have only expedited the soil erosion.

== Other issues ==
The final reasoning for a decline in rice production is the common issues surrounding many farmers in countries that are less developed. Oftentimes these issues are universal and can only contribute to the above-mentioned problems Haitian farmers are facing. The issues include the obvious issue of the lack of financial resources. Many farmers in Haiti do not have access to funds. More often than not, the capitol that these farmers are privy to is accompanied by extremely high interest rates. Along with this financial issue is the inability for many farmers to purchase a variety of rice. They are often subjected to a type of rice that is low-yielding for a lack of funds keeps them from the high-producing breed. An abundance of inefficient farming machines also contributes to the slow mobilization of rice in Haiti along with the lack of an adequate storage system. Farmers must sell rice immediately of cultivation and often the rice must be sold at a decreased price to ensure its location on the market. While there are other issues equated to farming inadequacies, the main issues have already been addressed.

== Impact ==
The health of the entire Haitian economy and society is threatened by the scarcity of the domestic rice trade. There is more than two-thirds of the Haitian population directly involved with rice production and countless more indirectly involved. Rice farmers, millers, and those in the rice trade number upwards of hundreds of thousands of people. This is why the collapse of the rice industry in Haiti is so detrimental to the entire population. Rice was once a staple crop in Haiti and now there are little quantities of rice that is grown in the country. Haiti is already plagued by high poverty rates and massive unemployment. The issue with the rice trade only threatens these situations even more. Eric Icart and James Trapp, researchers of agricultural and food price policy, concluded that "the level of farm income declined because of negative impacts on rural incomes."

"Farmers lost their businesses. People from the countryside started losing their jobs and moving to the cities. After a few years of cheap imported rice, local production went way down." There are some farmers who look to other crops for employment but this only further enhances the decrease of domestic rice. These alternative crops often don't harvest many results and thus there are many fields that are abandoned by struggling Haitians. There are few opportunities for these farmers outside of the rice industry and immigration is often the last hope of prosperity. It is not uncommon for these farmers to move to Port-au-Prince, Haiti or to a surrounding country such as Caribbean or the Americas. It is very common for these migrating Haitians to become involved in the informal work force. This is because it hard to find adequate work in for a living wage. Factories are often explored but many are overwhelmingly occupied. Even when locating a job, these immigrants often work for very low wages in conditions that are not favorable.

It is not uncommon for Haitians to illegally immigrate due to the inability to secure work visa for many poor rural Haitians. In many ways, they face a harsher risk leaving Haiti than those who choose to stay. Those traveling into another country illegally often choose to arrive on a boat. However, the boats have been proven to be extremely dangerous and there is a large percentage of Haitians who die at sea in an attempt to reach their destination. There was one instance that occurred in 2000 in which a boat, carrying Haitians to the Turks and Caicos Islands, capsized and killed sixty people that were on board.
