= Ethanol fuel by country =

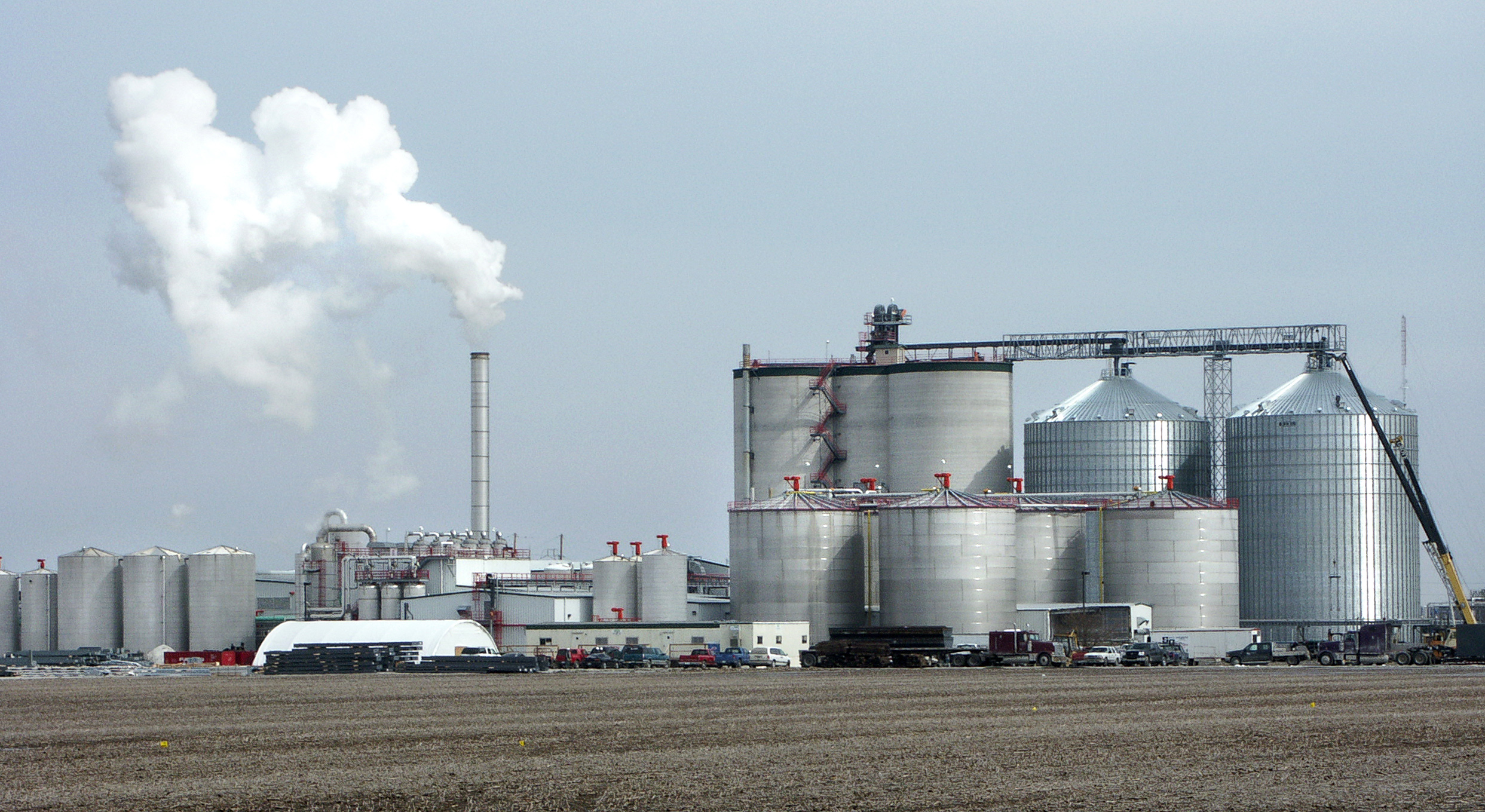
Corn ethanol plant in the United States

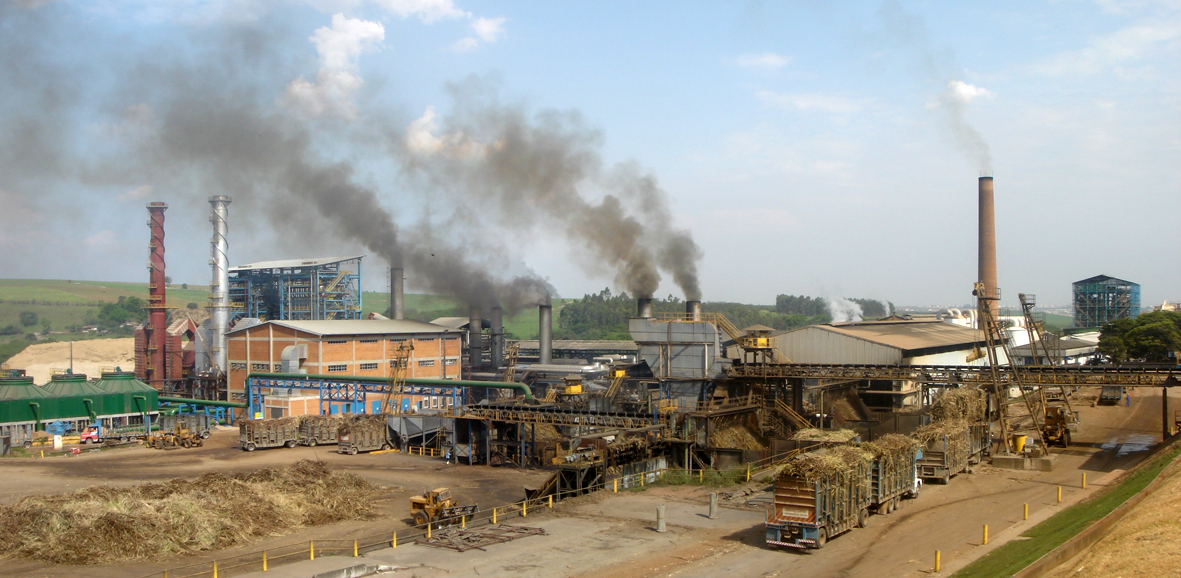
Sugarcane ethanol plant in Brazil

The world's top ethanol fuel producers in 2011 were the United States with 13.9 billion U.S. liquid gallons (bg) (52.6 billion liters) and Brazil with 5.6 bg (21.1 billion liters), accounting together for 87.1% of world production of 22.36 billion US gallons (84.6 billion liters). Strong incentives, coupled with other industry development initiatives, are giving rise to fledgling ethanol industries in countries such as Germany, Spain, France, Sweden, India, China, Thailand, Canada, Colombia, Australia, and some Central American countries.

== Main producers ==
The following table summarizes annual ethanol fuel production by the main producer countries or regions:

Annual fuel ethanol production by country (2015–2024) (Millions of U.S. liquid gallons per year)
World Rank (2024)	Country/Region	% of World Production	2024	2023	2022	2021	2020	2019	2018	2017	2016	2015?
1	United States	52%	16,219	15,580	15,361	15,016	13,941	15,778	16,091	15,936	15,413	14,807
2	Brazil	28%	8,780	8,470	7,400	7,320	8,100	8,590	7,990	6,650	6,750	7,200
3	India	5%	1,630	1,510	1,220	950	530	510	430	200	280	190
4	European Union	5%	1,440	1,390	1,420	1,380	1,310	1,370	1,450	1,420	1,360	1,360
5	China	4%	1,200	1,070	960	900	940	1,000	770	800	670	770
6	Canada	1%	464	454	447	434	429	520	460	460	460	450
7	Thailand	1%	360	340	380	350	390	430	390	390	340	310
8	Argentina	1%	310	310	310	270	210	280	290	290	240	220
*	Rest of World	3%	807	806	722	690	630	522	529	454	487	393
	World total	100%	31,210	29,930	28,220	27,310	26,480	29,000	28,400	26,600	26,000	25,700

== Brazil ==
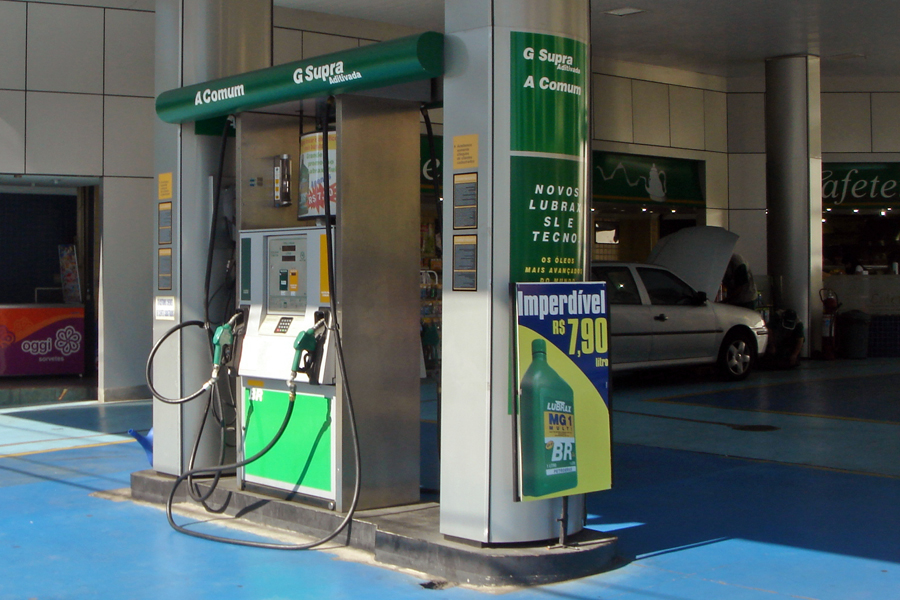
Brazil has ethanol fuel available throughout the country. A typical Petrobras filling station in São Paulo with dual fuel service, marked A for alcohol (ethanol) and G for gasoline.

Brazil has the largest and most successful bio-fuel programs in the world, involving production of ethanol fuel from sugarcane, and it is considered to have the world's first sustainable biofuels economy. In 2006 Brazilian ethanol provided 18% of the country's road transport sector fuel consumption needs, and by April 2008, more than 50% of fuel consumption for the gasoline market. As a result of the increasing use of ethanol, together with the exploitation of domestic deep water oil sources, Brazil reached in 2006 a volumetric self-sufficiency in oil supply, but is not effectively self-sufficient, since most of its locally extracted oil is heavy.

Until 2005 Brazil was the world's top producer of ethanol fuel when it was surpassed by the United States. Together both countries were responsible in 2011 for 87.1% of the world's ethanol fuel production. In 2009 Brazil produced 27.5 billion liters (7.26 billion U.S. liquid gallons), representing 35.9% of the world's total ethanol used as fuel. Sugar cane plantations covered 3.6 million hectares of land for ethanol production, representing just 1% of Brazil's arable land, with a productivity of 7,500 liters of ethanol per hectare, as compared with Germany maize ethanol productivity of 3,000 liters per hectare.

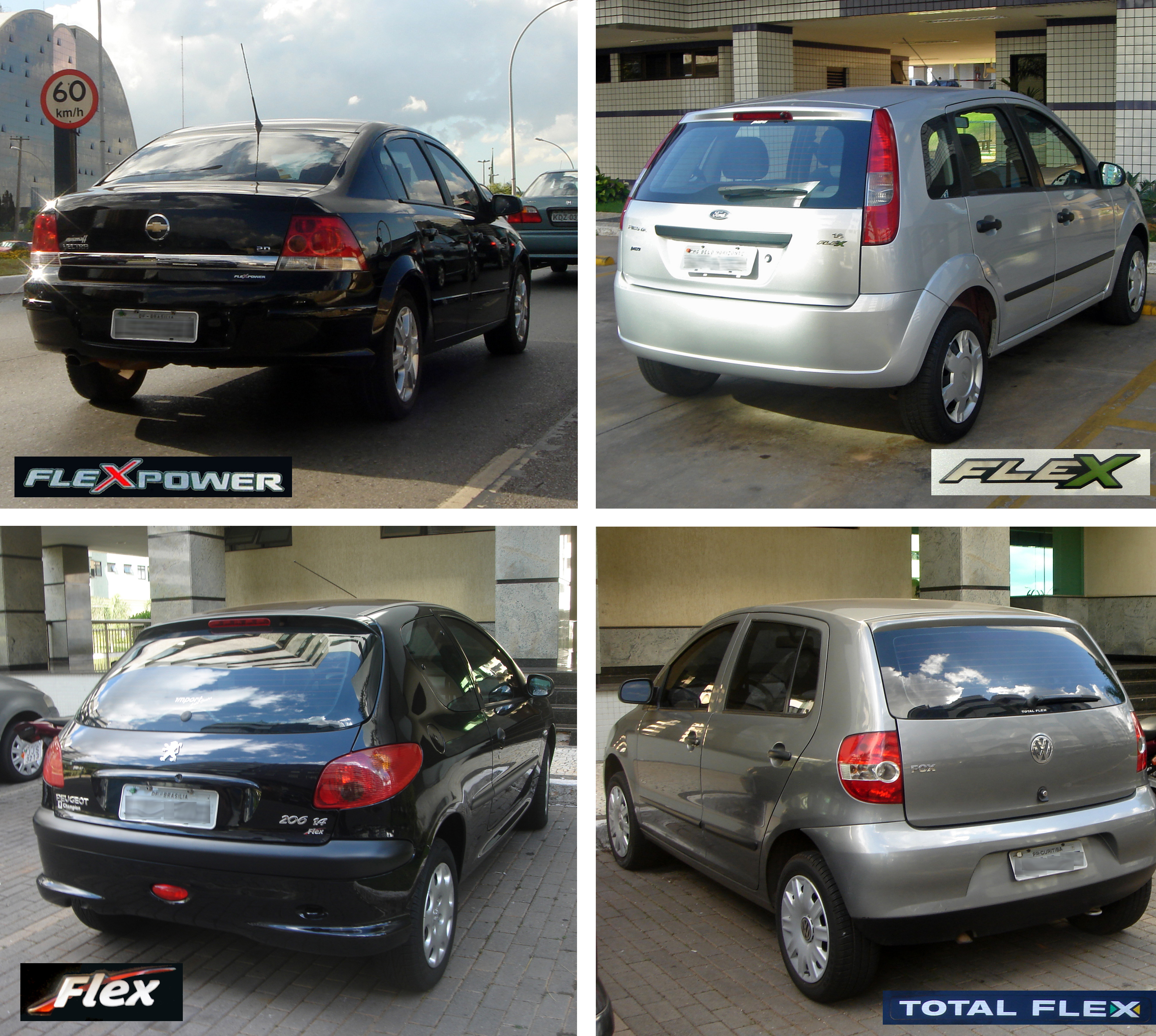
Typical Brazilian "flex" models from several carmakers, that run on any blend of ethanol and gasoline, from E20-E25 gasohol to E100 ethanol fuel.

The ethanol industry in Brazil is more than 30 years old and even though it is no longer subsidized, production and use of ethanol was stimulated through:

- Low-interest loans for the construction of ethanol distilleries
- Guaranteed purchase of ethanol by the state-owned oil company at a reasonable price
- Retail pricing of neat ethanol so it is competitive if not slightly favorable to the gasoline-ethanol blend
- Tax incentives provided during the 1980s to stimulate the purchase of neat ethanol vehicles.

Guaranteed purchase and price regulation were ended some years ago, with relatively positive results. Ethanol producers in the state of São Paulo established a research and technology transfer center that has been effective in improving sugar cane and ethanol yields.

There are no longer light vehicles in Brazil running on pure gasoline. Since 1977 the government made mandatory to blend 20% of ethanol (E20) with gasoline (gasohol), requiring just a minor adjustment on regular gasoline motors. Today the mandatory blend is allowed to vary nationwide between 18% and 27.5% ethanol (E27) and it is used by all regular gasoline vehicles and flexible-fuel vehicles. The Brazilian car manufacturing industry developed flexible-fuel vehicles that can run on any proportion of gasoline and ethanol. Introduced in the market in 2003, these vehicles became a commercial success, reaching the milestone of 10 million vehicles produced in March 2010, and 15 million in January 2012. The ethanol-powered "flex" vehicles, as they are popularly known, are manufactured to tolerate hydrated ethanol (E100), an azeotrope composed of 95.6% ethanol and 4.4% water.

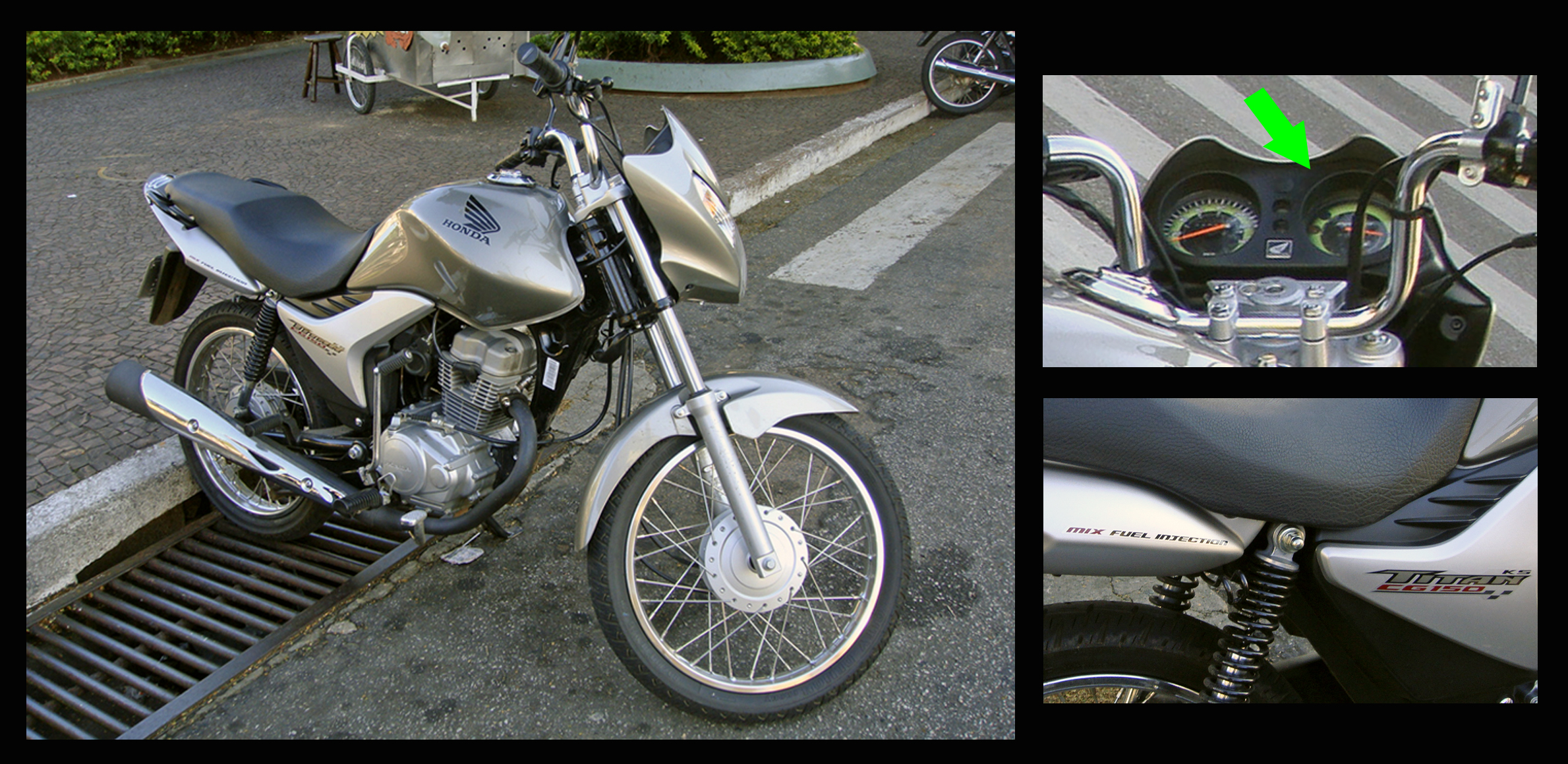
The Honda CG 150 Titan Mix was launched in the Brazilian market in 2009 and became the first mass production flex-fuel motorcycle sold in the world.

The first flex motorcycle was launched to the market by Honda in March 2009, and a second model in September 2009. By the end of 2009, both Honda flexible-fuel motorcycles had sold a total of 183,375 units, representing an 11.4% market share of the Brazilian new motorcycle sales in that year. Two other flex-fuel motorcycles manufactured by Honda were launched in October 2010 and January 2011. During 2011 a total of 956,117 flex-fuel motorcycles were produced, raising its market share to 56.7%. Cumulative production of the four available flex fuel models since 2009 reached 1.48 million units in December 2011. and 2011.

Since 2009, the Brazilian ethanol industry has experienced financial stress due to the credit crunch caused by the 2008 financial crisis; poor sugarcane harvests due to unfavorable weather; high sugar prices in the world markets that made it more attractive to produce sugar rather than ethanol; and other domestic factors that resulted in a decline of its annual production despite a growing demand in the local market. Brazilian ethanol fuel production in 2011 was 21.1 billion liters (5.6 billion U.S. liquid gallons), down from 26.2 billion liters (6.9 billion gallons) in 2010. A supply shortage took place for several months during 2010 and 2011 and prices climbed to the point that ethanol fuel was no longer attractive for owners of flex-fuel vehicles; the government reduced the minimum ethanol blend in gasoline to reduce demand and keep ethanol fuel prices from rising further; and for the first time since the 1990s, ethanol fuel was imported from the United States.

== United States ==
U.S. fuel ethanol production and imports (2001–2010) (Millions of U.S. liquid gallons)
Year	Production	Imports	Demand
2001	1,770	n/a	n/a
2002	2,130	46	2,085
2003	2,800	61	2,900
2004	3,400	161	3,530
2005	3,904	135	4,049
2006	4,855	653	5,377
2007	6,500	450	6,847
2008	9,000	556	9,637
2009	10,600	190	10,940
2010	13,230	10	13,184
Demand figures includes stocks change and small exports in 2005

The United States produces and consumes more ethanol fuel than any other country in the world. Ethanol use as fuel dates back to Henry Ford, who in 1896 designed his first car, the "Quadricycle" to run on pure ethanol. Then in 1908, he produced the famous Ford Model T capable of running on gasoline, ethanol or a combination of both. Ford continued to advocate for ethanol as fuel even during Prohibition.

Most cars on the road today in the U.S. can run on blends of up to 10% ethanol, and motor vehicle manufacturers already produce vehicles designed to run on much higher ethanol blends. In 2007 Portland, Oregon, became the first city in the United States to require all gasoline sold within city limits to contain at least 10% ethanol. As of January 2008, three states — Missouri, Minnesota, and Hawaii — require ethanol to be blended with gasoline motor fuel. Many cities also require ethanol blends due to non-attainment of federal air quality goals.

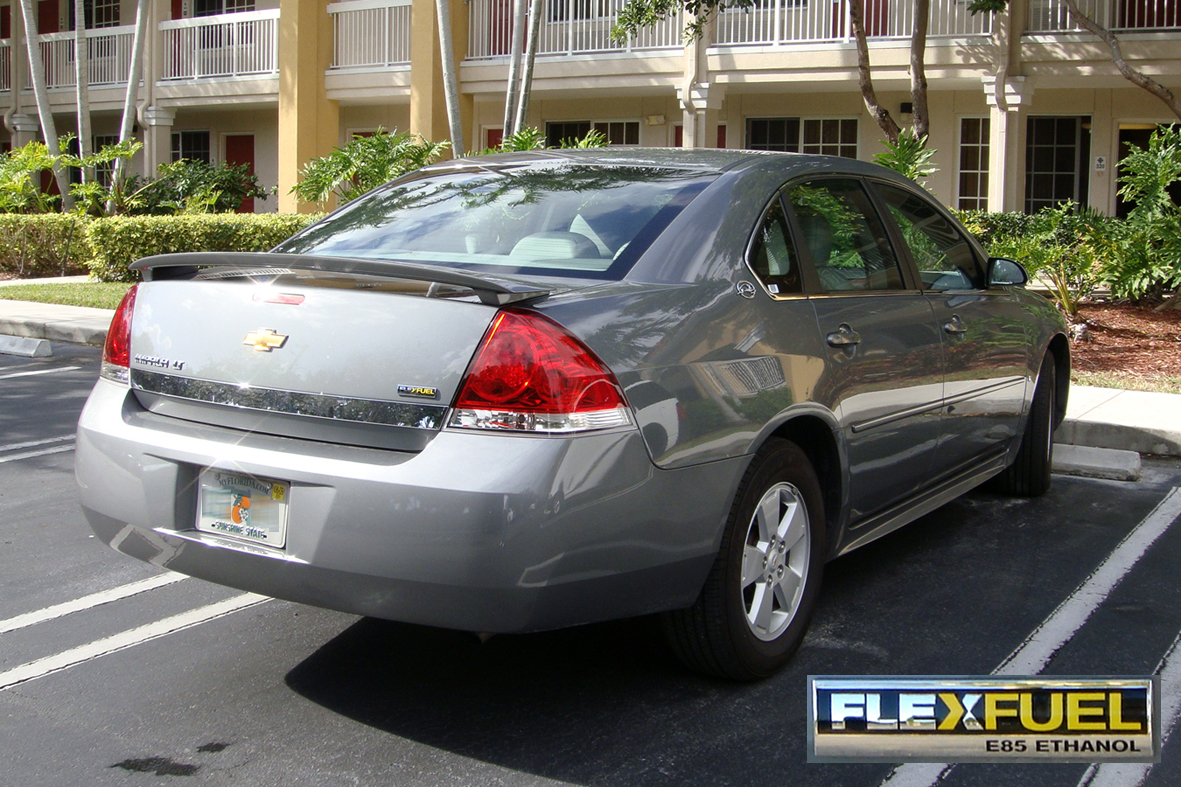
E85 FlexFuel Chevrolet Impala LT 2009, Miami, Florida.

Several motor vehicle manufacturers, including Ford, Chrysler, and GM, sell flexible-fuel vehicles that can use gasoline and ethanol blends ranging from pure gasoline all the way up to 85% ethanol (E85). As of early 2013, there were about 11 million E85-compatible vehicles on U.S. roads, though actual use of E85 fuel is limited, not only because the ethanol fueling infrastructures is limited, but also because many owners are not aware their vehicle is flex-fuel capable. As of March 2013, there were 3,028 fueling stations selling E85 in the U.S.

There are many promising crops for ethanol production that are gaining in popularity. Among these are algae, miscanthus, switchgrass, and sugarcane. Other options are what are known as cellulosic biomass which includes plant parts currently wasted in contemporary industrial, chemical agriculture like wheat stalks, corn stalks, and other biomass left after harvesting. Many of these crops yield much higher ethanol amounts per acre.

The production of fuel ethanol from corn in the United States is controversial for a few reasons. Production of ethanol from corn is 5 to 6 times less efficient than producing it from sugarcane. The reason that corn has been notoriously used for ethanol production is because farmers are either paid to destroy crops or to not grow corn crops. Another reason is that the cost of processing and transporting raw corn can be more expensive than transporting and processing it in to ethanol fuel. Corn production is highly dependent upon government subsidies, so naturally ethanol derived from corn is also highly dependent on government subsidies. Contrary to what most would claim, ethanol is not a food-versus-fuel issue. Corn, along with other crops that have been distilled are still a usable food source for cattle. Known as dried distillers grains, it is proven to be significantly healthier and easier for cattle to digest. In October 2008, the first "biofuels corridor" was officially opened along I-65, a major interstate highway in the central United States. Stretching from northern Indiana to southern Alabama, this corridor consisting of more than 200 individual fueling stations makes it possible to drive a flex-fueled vehicle from Lake Michigan to the Gulf of Mexico without being further than a quarter tank worth of fuel from an E85 pump.

On 23 April 2009, the California Air Resources Board approved the specific rules and carbon intensity reference values for the California Low-Carbon Fuel Standard (LCFS) that will go into effect on 1 January 2011. During the consultation process there was controversy regarding the inclusion and modeling of indirect land use change effects. After the CARB's ruling, among other criticisms, representatives of the US ethanol industry complained that this standard overstates the environmental effects of corn ethanol, and also criticized the inclusion of indirect effects of land-use changes as an unfair penalty to domestically produced corn ethanol because deforestation in the developing world is being tied to US ethanol production. The initial reference value set for 2011 for LCFS means that Mid-west corn ethanol will not meet the California standard unless current carbon intensity is reduced.

A similar controversy arose after the U.S. Environmental Protection Agency (EPA) published on 5 May 2009, its notice of proposed rulemaking for the new Renewable Fuel Standard (RFS). The draft of the regulations was released for public comment during a 60-day period. EPA's proposed regulations also included the carbon footprint from indirect land-use changes. On the same day, President Barack Obama signed a Presidential directive with the aim to advance biofuels research and improve their commercialization. The Directive established a Biofuels Interagency Working Group comprising three agencies, the Department of Agriculture, the Environmental Protection Agency, and the Department of Energy. This group will develop a plan to increase flexible fuel vehicle use and assist in retail marketing efforts. Also they will coordinate infrastructure policies impacting the supply, secure transport, and distribution of biofuels. The group will also come up with policy ideas for increasing investment in next-generation fuels, such as cellulosic ethanol, and for reducing the environmental footprint of growing biofuels crops, particularly corn-based ethanol.

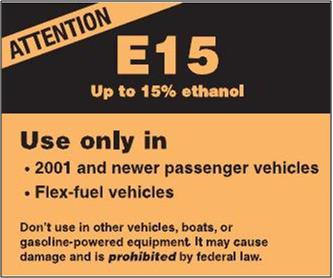
EPA's E15 label required to be displayed in all E15 fuel dispensers in the U.S.

In October 2010, the E.P.A. granted a waiver to allow the E15 blend to be sold only for cars and trucks with a model year of 2007 or later, representing about 15% of vehicles on the U.S. roads. As stations are not required to offer E15, a practical barrier to the commercialization of E15 is the lack of infrastructure, similar to the limitations suffered by sales of E85. In January 2011, the waiver was expanded to authorize use of E15 to include model year 2001 through 2006 passenger vehicles. The EPA also decided not to grant any waiver for E15 use in any motorcycles, heavy-duty vehicles, or nonroad engines because current testing data do not support such a waiver. According to the Renewable Fuels Association, the E15 waivers now cover 62% of vehicles on the road in the US, and the ethanol group estimates if all 2001 and newer cars and pickups were to use E15, the theoretical blend wall for ethanol use would be approximately 17.5 billion gallons (66.2 billion liters) per year. The EPA was still studying if older cars can withstand a 15% ethanol blend. In order to adjust to EPA regulations, 2012 and 2013 model year vehicles manufactured by General Motors can use fuel containing up to 15 percent ethanol, as indicated in the vehicle owners' manuals. However, the carmaker warned that for model year 2011 or earlier vehicles, they "strongly recommend that GM customers refer to their owners manuals for the proper fuel designation for their vehicles." Ford Motor Company also is manufacturing all of its 2013 vehicles E15 compatible, including hybrid electrics and vehicles with Ecoboost engines. As of June 2013, there are about 24 fueling stations selling E15 out of 180,000 stations across the U.S.

== Europe ==
Production of Bioethanol in the EU (GWh)
No	Country	2005	2006
1	Germany	978	2,554
2	Spain	1,796	2,382
3	France	853	1,482
4	Sweden	907	830
5	Italy	47	759
6	Poland	379	711
7	Hungary	207	201
8	Lithuania	47	107
9	Netherlands	47	89
10	Czech Republic	0	89
11	Latvia	71	71
12	Finland	77	0
27	Total	5,411	9,274
n.a. = not available

Consumption of Bioethanol in the EU (GWh)
No	Country	2005	2006	2007
1	Germany	1,682	3,544	3,408
2	France	871	1,719	3,174
3	Sweden	1,681	1,894	2,113
4	Spain	1,314	1,332	1,310
5	Poland	329	611	991
6	United Kingdom	502	563	907
7	Bulgaria	-	0	769
8	Austria	0	0	254
9	Slovakia	0	4	154
10	Lithuania	10	64	135
11	Hungary	28	136	107
12	Netherlands	0	179	101
13	Denmark	-	42	70
14	Ireland	0	13	54
15	Latvia	5	12	20
16	Luxembourg	0	0	10
17	Slovenia	0	2	9
18	Czech Republic	0	13	2
19	Italy	59	0	0
20	Finland	0	10	n.a.
27	EU	6,481	10,138	13,563

The consumption of bioethanol in Europe is largest in Sweden, France and Spain. Germany's bioethanol market vanished completely after the removal of federal tax incentives after 2015. Europe produces equivalent to 90% of its consumption (2006). Germany produced about 70% of its consumption, Spain 60% and Sweden 50% (2006). In 2007, in Sweden there were 792 E85 filling stations and in France 131 E85 service stations with 550 more under construction.

=== Iceland ===
On 17 September 2007 the first ethanol fuel pump was opened in Reykjavik, Iceland. This pump is the only one of its kind in Iceland. The fuel is imported by Brimborg, a Volvo dealer, as a pilot to see how ethanol fueled cars work in Iceland.

=== Netherlands ===
In the Netherlands regular petrol with no bio-additives is slowly being phased out, since EU-legislation has been passed that requires the fraction of nonmineral origin to become minimum 5.75% of the total fuel consumption volume in 2010. This can be realised by substitutions in diesel or in petrol of any biological source; or fuel sold in the form of pure biofuel. (2007) There are only a few gas stations where E85 is sold, which is an 85% ethanol, 15% petrol mix.

=== Germany ===
Germany initially built up a reasonably widespread biofuel infrastructure but after tax incentives were withdrawn by the federal government in 2015, E85 completely disappeared from the country's service stations. Biofuel is now taxed the same as regular fuel.

=== France ===
In France, with its large agricultural sector, there was some initial interest in E85 fuel around 2000, but the conversion kits to enable petrol car engines to use E85 efficiently could not be made legal (homologué) and it remained a niche market. After the conversion kits were legalised and encouraged from about 2015, the E85 market in France grew very rapidly, especially as "dieselgate" made governments rethink their diesel tax strategies, and in many cases ban diesels from city centres. By 2019, E85 was easy to find at ordinary service stations nearly everywhere in France, and in (2020) it was also significantly (up to about 50%) cheaper than petrol. Currently (July 2021) it is unknown what the price difference is between E85 and gasoline with lesser added amounts of Ethanol.

=== Switzerland ===
Switzerland has poor E85 coverage, with some cantons without any E85 pumps at service stations, and it is also significantly more expensive than in neighbouring countries, as by law it must be produced from wood waste, rather than specifically grown crops, to avoid competing for agricultural land with food crops. However, Switzerland allows up to 40 litres of fuel to be brought into the country tax free, in addition to the contents of the vehicle's own fuel tank. Fuel tanked abroad cannot be taxed and a recent payment receipt will in most cases suffice to prevent fines if customs check tank contents. (Authorities are aware of high taxation on fuels and cross-border fuel refilling is a well-known practice.)

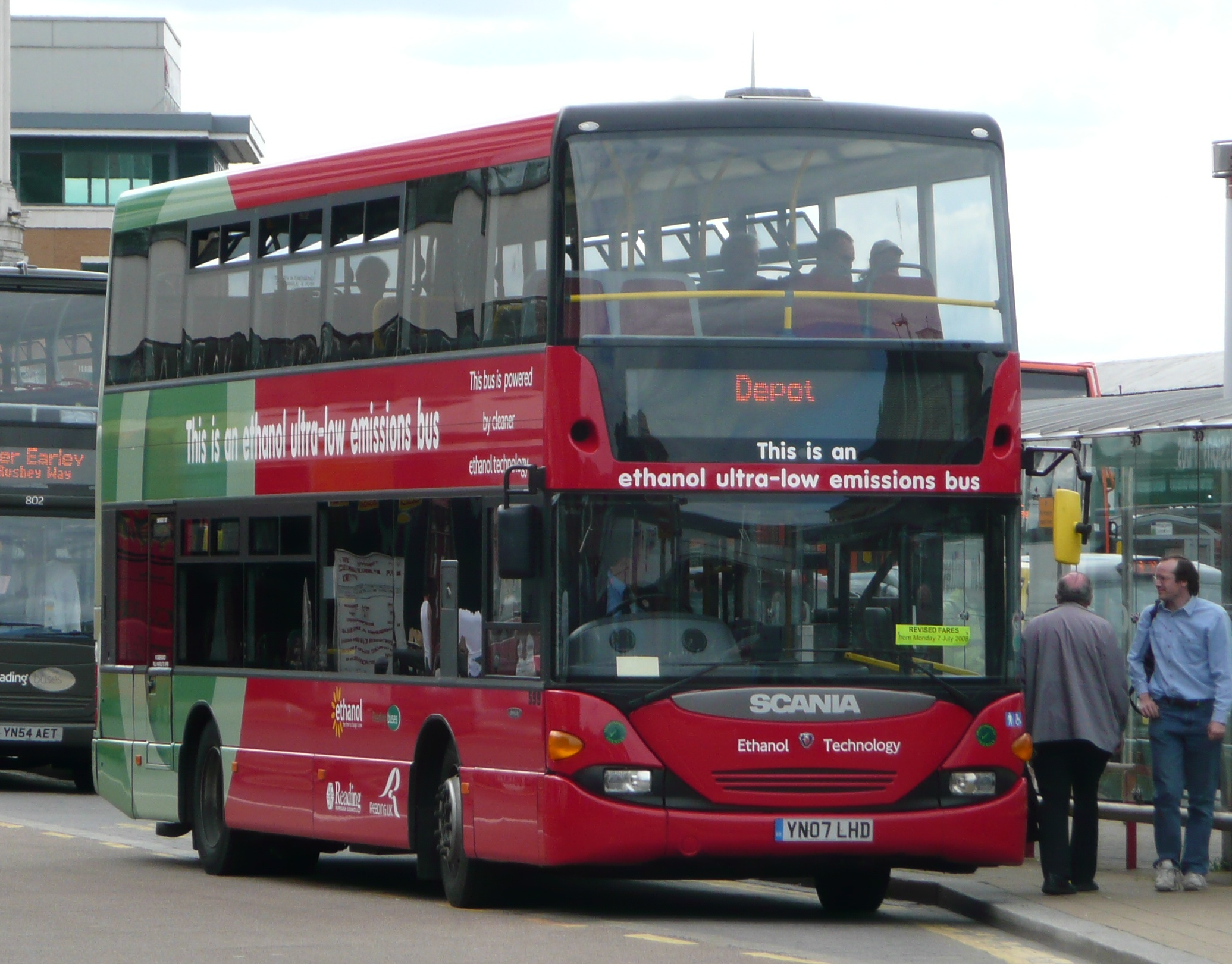
An example of an ethanol powered bus. This is a Scania OmniCity which has been touring the United Kingdom, which does not use the fuel widely. A larger fleet of similar buses entered service in Stockholm in 2008.

=== Sweden ===
Sweden is the leading country in Europe regarding the use of ethanol as fuel, though it has to import most of the ethanol. All Swedish gas stations are required by an act of parliament to offer at least one alternative fuel, and every fifth car in Stockholm now drives at least partially on alternative fuels, mostly ethanol. The number of bioethanol stations in Europe is highest in Sweden, with 1,200 stations and a fleet of 116 thousand flexible-fuel vehicle as of July 2008.

Stockholm will introduce a fleet of Swedish-made electric hybrid buses in its public transport system on a trial basis in 2008. These buses will use ethanol-powered internal-combustion engines and electric motors. The vehicles' diesel engines will use ethanol.

In order to achieve a broader use of biofuels several government incentives were implemented. Ethanol, as the other biofuels, were exempted of both, the CO_{2} and energy taxes until 2009, resulting in a 30% price reduction at the pump of E85 fuel over gasoline. Furthermore, other demand side incentives for flexifuel vehicle owners include a financial bonus to buyers of FFVs, exemption from the Stockholm congestion tax, up to 20% discount on auto insurance, free parking spaces in most of the largest cities, lower annual registration taxes, and a 20% tax reduction for flexifuel company cars. Also, a part of the program, the Swedish Government ruled that 25% of their vehicle purchases (excluding police, fire and ambulance vehicles) must be alternative fuel vehicles.; By the first months of 2008, this package of incentives resulted in sales of flexible-fuel cars representing 25% of new car sales.

Bioethanol stations in Europe in 2014
Country	Stations	No/10^{6} persons	No/10^{3} km^{2}
Sweden	1.800	193.25	4.18
Hungary	452	45.76	4.86
France	420	6.83	0.76
Czech Republic	361	34.96	4.58
Germany	334	4.15	0.94
Finland	106	19.38	0.31
Switzerland	57	7.58	1.38
Austria	45	5.29	0.54
Ireland	41	9.19	0.58
Netherlands	39	2.32	0.94
Lithuania	39	12.97	0.6
Spain	30	0.65	0.06
Norway	17	3.33	0.04
Latvia	5	2.21	0.08

== Asia ==
=== China ===
China is promoting ethanol-based fuel on a pilot basis in five cities in its central and northeastern region, a move designed to create a new market for its surplus grain and reduce consumption of petroleum. The cities include Zhengzhou, Luoyang and Nanyang in central China's Henan province, and Harbin and Zhaodong in Heilongjiang province, northeast China. Under the program, Henan will promote ethanol-based fuel across the province by the end of this year. Officials say the move is of great importance in helping to stabilize grain prices, raise farmers' income and reducing petrol- induced air pollution.

=== Thailand ===
Thailand already uses 10% ethanol (E10) on a large scale in the local market. Beginning in 2008 Thailand started with the sale of E20 and by late 2008 E85 flexible fuel vehicles were introduced with only two gas stations selling E85.

== Australia ==
Legislation in Australia imposes a 10% cap on the concentration of fuel ethanol blends. Blends of 90% unleaded petrol and 10% fuel ethanol are commonly referred to as E10. E10 is available through service stations operating under the BP, Caltex, Shell and United brands as well as those of a number of smaller independents. Not surprisingly, E10 is most widely available closer to the sources of production in Queensland and New South Wales where Sugar Cane is grown. E10 is most commonly blended with 91 RON "regular unleaded" fuel. There is a requirement that retailers label blends containing fuel ethanol on the dispenser.

Due to ethanol's greater stability under pressure it is used by Shell in their 100 octane fuel. Similarly IFS add 10% ethanol to their 91 octane fuel, label it premium fuel and sell it more cheaply than regular unleaded. This is converse to the general practice of adding ethanol to a lesser quality fuel to bring its octane rating up to 91.

Some concern was raised over the use of ethanol blend fuels in petrol vehicles in 2003, yet manufacturers widely claimed that their vehicles were engined for such fuels. Since then there have been no reports of adverse effects to vehicles running on ethanol blended fuels.

== Caribbean Basin ==
U.S. fuel ethanol imports by country (2002–2007) (Millions of U.S. liquid gallons)
Country	2007	2006	2005	2004	2003	2002
Brazil	188.8	433.7	31.2	90.3	0	0
Jamaica	75.2	66.8	36.3	36.6	39.3	29.0
El Salvador	73.3	38.5	23.7	5.7	6.9	4.5
Trinidad and Tobago	42.7	24.8	10.0	0	0	0
Costa Rica	39.3	35.9	33.4	25.4	14.7	12.0

All countries in Central America, northern South America and the Caribbean are located in a tropical zone with suitable climate for growing sugar cane. In fact, most of these countries have a long tradition of growing sugar cane mainly for producing sugar and alcoholic beverages.

As a result of the guerrilla movements in Central America, in 1983 the United States unilateral and temporarily approved the Caribbean Basin Initiative, allowing most countries in the region to benefit from several tariff and trade benefits. These benefits were made permanent in 1990 and more recently, these benefits were replaced by the Caribbean Basin Trade and Partnership Act, approved in 2000, and the Dominican Republic–Central America Free Trade Agreement that went to effect in 2008. All these agreements have allowed several countries in the region to export ethanol to the U.S. free of tariffs. Until 2004, the countries that benefited the most were Jamaica and Costa Rica, but as the U.S. began demanding more fuel ethanol, the two countries increased their exports and two others began exporting. In 2007, Jamaica, El Salvador, Trinidad and Tobago and Costa Rica exported together to the U.S. a total of 230.5 million gallons of ethanol, representing 54.1% of U.S. fuel ethanol imports. Brazil began exporting ethanol to the U.S. in 2004 and exported 188.8 million gallons representing 44.3% of U.S. ethanol imports in 2007. The remaining 1.6% imports that year came from Canada and China.

In March 2007, "ethanol diplomacy" was the focus of President George W. Bush's Latin American tour, in which he and Brazil's president, Luiz Inácio Lula da Silva, were seeking to promote the production and use of sugar cane based ethanol throughout Latin America and the Caribbean. The two countries also agreed to share technology and set international standards for biofuels. The Brazilian sugar cane technology transfer would allow several Central American, Caribbean and Andean countries to take advantage of their tariff-free trade agreements to increase or become exporters to the United States in the short-term. Also, in August 2007, Brazil's president toured Mexico and several countries in Central America and the Caribbean to promote Brazilian ethanol technology. The ethanol alliance between the U.S. and Brazil generated some negative reactions from Venezuela's President Hugo Chávez, and by then Cuba's President, Fidel Castro, who wrote: "you will see how many people among the hungry masses of our planet will no longer consume corn... Or even worse, by offering financing to poor countries to produce ethanol from corn or any other kind of food, no tree will be left to defend humanity from climate change." Daniel Ortega, Nicaragua's President, and one of the preferential recipients of Brazilian technical aid also voiced critics to the Bush plan, but he vowed support for sugar cane based ethanol during Lula's visit to Nicaragua.

=== Colombia ===
Colombia's ethanol program began in 2002, based on a law approved in 2001 mandating a mix of 10% ethanol with regular gasoline, and the plan is to gradually reach a 25% blend in twenty-years. Sugar cane-based ethanol production began in 2005, when the law went into effect, and as local production was not enough to supply enough ethanol to the entire country's fleet, the program was implemented only on cities with more than 500,000 inhabitants, such as Cali, Pereira, and the capital city of Bogotá. All of the ethanol production comes from the Department of Valle del Cauca, Colombia's traditional sugar cane region. Cassava is the second source of ethanol, and potatoes and castor oil are also being studied.

In March 2009 the Colombian government enacted a mandate to introduce E85 flexible-fuel cars. The executive decree applies to all gasoline-powered vehicles with engines smaller than 2.0 liters manufactured, imported, and commercialized in the country beginning in 2012, mandating that 60% of such vehicles must have flex-fuel engines capable of running with gasoline or E85, or any blend of both. By 2014 the mandatory quota is 80% and it will reach 100% by 2016. All vehicles with engines bigger than 2.0 liters must be E85 capable starting in 2013. The decree also mandates that by 2011 all gasoline stations must provide infrastructure to guarantee availability of E85 throughout the country. The mandatory introduction of E85 flex-fuels has been controversial.

=== Costa Rica ===
The government, based on the National Biofuel Program, established the mandatory use of all gasoline sold in Costa Rica with a blend of around 7.5% ethanol, starting in October 2008. The implementation phase follows a two-year trial that took place in the provinces of Guanacaste and Puntarenas. The government expects to increase the percentage of ethanol mixed with gasoline to 12% in the next 4 to 5 years. The Costa Rican government is pursuing this policy to lower the country's dependency of foreign oil and to reduce the amount of greenhouse gases produced. The plan also calls for an increase in ethanol producing crops and tax breaks for flex-fuel vehicles and other alternative fuel vehicles. The introduction of the blend of 7% ethanol was postponed in September 2008 until the beginning of 2009. This delay was due to a request by the national association of fuel retailers to have more time available to adapt their fueling infrastructure. Additional delays caused another postponement, as fueling stations were not ready yet for handling ethanol fuel, and now implementation is expected for November 2009.

Despite the official postponement, during the months of February and March 2009, ethanol in different blends was sold without warning to consumers, which was cause for complaints. The national distribution company, RECOPE, explained that it had already bought 50,000 barrels (7,900 m^{3}) of ethanol stored and ready for distribution, so it decided to use an oxygenate in substitution of MTBE. Nevertheless, retail sales of E7 continue uninterrupted in the trial regions of Guanacaste and the Central Pacific for three years now.

=== El Salvador ===
As a result of the cooperation agreement between the United States and Brazil, El Salvador was chosen in 2007 to lead a pilot experience to introduce state-of-the-art technology for growing sugar cane for production of ethanol fuel in Central America, as this technical bilateral cooperation is looking for helping Central American countries to reduce their dependence on foreign oil.

== Comparison of Brazil and the U.S. ==
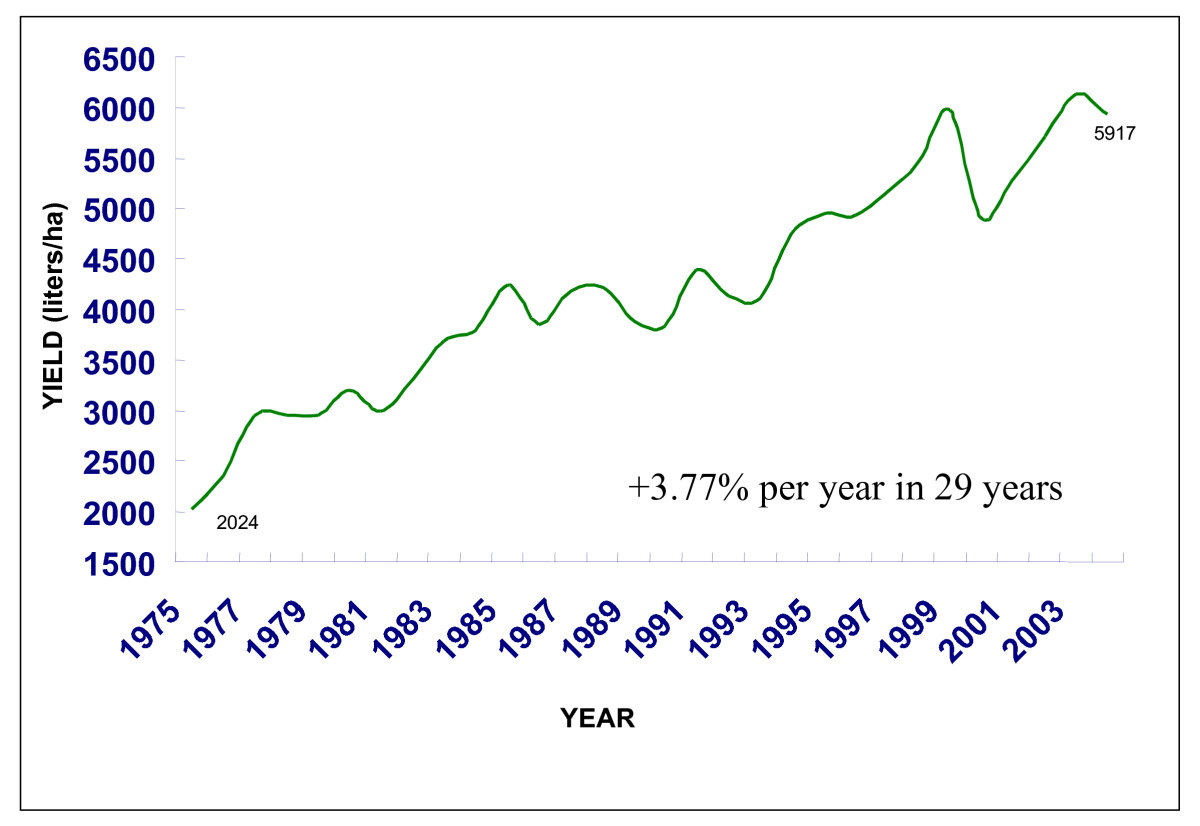
Evolution of the ethanol productivity per hectare of sugarcane planted in Brazil between 1975 and 2004. Source: Goldemberg (2008).

Brazil's sugar cane-based industry is far more efficient than the U.S. corn-based industry. Brazilian distillers are able to produce 1 liter of ethanol for $0.19–0.24 (or $0.71–0.90 per gallon), compared with the $0.41–0.46 per liter for corn-based ethanol (or $1.55–1.74 per gallon) (no reliable source referenced). Sugarcane cultivation requires a tropical or subtropical climate, with a minimum of 600 mm (24 in) of annual rainfall. Sugarcane is one of the most efficient photosynthesizers in the plant kingdom, able to convert up to 2% of incident solar energy into biomass. Ethanol is produced by yeast fermentation of the sugar extracted from sugar cane.

Sugarcane production in the United States occurs in Florida, Louisiana, Hawaii, and Texas. In prime growing regions, such as Hawaii, sugarcane can produce 20 kg for each square meter exposed to the sun. The first three plants to produce sugar cane-based ethanol are expected to go online in Louisiana by mid 2009. Sugar mill plants in Lacassine, St. James and Bunkie were converted to sugar cane-based ethanol production using Colombian technology in order to enable a profitable ethanol production. These three plants will produce 100 million gallons of ethanol within five years.

U.S. corn-derived ethanol costs 30% more because the corn starch must first be converted to sugar before being distilled into alcohol. Despite this cost differential in production, in contrast to Japan and Sweden, the U.S. did not import much of Brazilian ethanol because of U.S. trade barriers corresponding to a tariff of 54-cent per gallon – a levy designed to offset the 45-cent per gallon blender's federal tax credit that was applied to ethanol no matter its country of origin. In 2011 the U.S. Congress decided not to extend the tariff and the tax credit, and as a result both ended on December 31, 2011. Since 1980 the U.S. ethanol industry was awarded an estimated US$45 billion in subsidies. One advantage U.S. corn-derived ethanol offers is the ability to return 1/3 of the feedstock back into the market as a replacement for the corn used in the form of Distillers Dried Grain.

Comparison of key characteristics between the ethanol industries in the United States and Brazil
Characteristic	Brazil	U.S.	Units/comments
Feedstock	Sugar cane	Maize	Main cash crop for ethanol production, the US has less than 2% from other crops.
Total ethanol fuel production (2009)	6,578	10,750	Million U.S. liquid gallons
Total arable land	355	270^{(1)}	Million hectares.
Total area used for ethanol crop (2006)	3.6 (1%)	10 (3.7%)	Million hectares (% total arable)
Productivity per hectare	6,800-8,000	3,800-4,000	Liters of ethanol per hectare. Brazil is 727 to 870 gal/acre (2006), US is 321 to 424 gal/acre (2003)
Energy balance (input energy productivity)	8.3 to 10.2	1.3 to 1.6	Ratio of the energy obtained from ethanol/energy expended in its production
Estimated greenhouse gas emission reduction	86-90%^{(2)}	10-30%^{(2)}	% GHGs avoided by using ethanol instead of gasoline, using existing crop land (No ILUC).
Full life-cycle carbon intensity	73.40	105.10^{(3)}	Grams of CO_{2} equivalent released per MJ of energy produced, includes indirect land use changes.
Estimated payback time for GHG emissions	17 years^{(4)}	93 years^{(4)}	Brazilian cerrado for sugarcane and US grassland for corn. Land use change scenarios by Fargione
Total flex-fuel vehicles produced/sold	16.3 million	10 million	All fleets as of December 2011. The Brazilian fleet includes 1.5 million flex fuel motorcycles. USDOE estimates that in 2009 only 504,297 flex-fuel vehicles were regularly fueled with E85 in the US.
Ethanol fueling stations in the country	35,017 (100%)	2,326(1%)	As % of total gas stations in the country. Brazil by December 2007. U.S. by July 2010. (170,000 total.)
Ethanol's share in the gasoline market	50%^{(5)}	10%	As % of total consumption on a volumetric basis. Brazil as of April 2008. U.S. as of December 2009.
Cost of production (USD/gallon)	0.71 to 0.90	1.55 to 1.74	2011 for Brazil (19¢ to 24¢/liter), 2011 for U.S. (41¢ to 46¢/liter)
Notes: (1) Only contiguous U.S., excludes Alaska. (2) Assuming no land use change. (3) CARB estimate for Midwest corn ethanol. California's gasoline carbon intensity is 95.86 blended with 10% ethanol. (4) Assuming direct land use change. (5) If diesel-powered vehicles are included and due to ethanol's lower energy content by volume, bioethanol represented 16.9% of the road sector energy consumption in 2007.
