= Caribbean Basin Trade and Partnership Act =

The Caribbean Basin Trade Partnership Act (CBTPA) is a law adopted by the U.S. Government in October 2000 to provide additional trade preferences for the 24 Caribbean countries. The Act expanded preferential treatment for apparel made in the Caribbean Basin by providing duty free and quota-free treatment of apparel made in the Caribbean Basin from U.S. fabrics formed from U.S. yarn and from certain knit apparel made from fabrics formed in the Caribbean Basin that incorporated U.S. yarns are used in forming the fabric. In addition, the Act provides NAFTA-equivalent tariff treatment for other specified items. The existing 24 countries of the Caribbean Basin Initiative were declared to be beneficiary countries under the Act.

== Background and adoption ==
On October 2 2000, President Clinton signed the proclamation implementing the Caribbean Basin Trade Partnership Act. The proclamation declared the 24 existing countries of the Caribbean Basin Initiative (CBI) to be "beneficiary countries" for purposes of the enhanced trade preferences under the CBTPA. In addition, the proclamation modified the Harmonized Tariff Schedule to reflect the new trade preferences.

It also delegated the authority to make additional determinations regarding the compliance with customs-related procedures to the Office of the United States Trade Representative, to be published in Federal Register notices.

== Summary of the enhanced CBTPA Preferences ==
The Act significantly expanded preferential treatment for apparel made in the Caribbean Basin region. It provides for duty free and quota-free treatment of apparel made in the Caribbean Basin from U.S. fabrics formed from U.S. yarns.

Duty free and quota-free treatment is also available for certain knit apparel made in beneficiary countries from fabrics formed in the Caribbean Basin region, provided U.S. yarns are used in forming the fabric. This "regional fabric" benefit for knit apparel is subject to an overall yearly limit, with a separate limit provided for T-shirts.

New duty/quota free treatment were also to be available for apparel made in the Caribbean Basin from fabrics determined to be in short supply in the United States, and for designated "hand-loomed, handmade, or folklore" articles.

In addition to the apparel preferences, the Act provides NAFTA-equivalent tariff treatment for certain items previously excluded from duty-free treatment under the CBI program (e.g., footwear, canned tuna, petroleum products, watches and watch parts).

== Beneficiary country designation ==
The Act authorized the President to designate individual countries as being beneficiary countries in order to receive the enhanced trade benefits available under the Act.

The 24 existing beneficiaries of the Caribbean Basin Economic Recovery Act (CBERA) were potentially eligible to be declared beneficiary countries under the Act.

These countries and territories were:

Antigua and Barbuda	Aruba	Bahamas	Barbados	Belize	Costa Rica
Dominica	Dominican Republic	El Salvador	Grenada	Guatemala	Guyana
Haiti	Honduras	Jamaica	Montserrat	Netherlands Antilles	Nicaragua
Panama	Saint Kitts and Nevis	Saint Lucia	Saint Vincent and the Grenadines	Trinidad and Tobago	British Virgin Islands

By proclamation, Clinton designated all 24 countries as "beneficiary countries".

== Eligibility Review Factors ==
In considering the eligibility of these countries for CBTPA Beneficiary Country status, the CBTPA required the President to take into account the existing eligibility criteria of the CBERA, as well as several new criteria elaborated in the CBTPA. These new criteria included:

1. whether the beneficiary country has demonstrated a commitment to undertake its obligations under the WTO on or ahead of schedule and participate in negotiations toward the completion of the FTAA or another free trade agreement.
2. the extent to which the country provides protection of intellectual property rights consistent with or greater than the protection afforded under the Agreement on Trade-Related Aspects of Intellectual Property Rights.
3. the extent to which the country provides internationally recognized worker's rights, including:
  - the right of association;
  - the right to organize and bargain collectively;
  - a prohibition on the use of any form of forced or compulsory labor;
  - a minimum age for the employment of children; and
  - acceptable conditions of work with respect to minimum wages, hours of work, and occupational safety and health;
4. whether the country has implemented its commitments to eliminate the worst forms of child labor.
5. the extent to which the country has met U.S. counter-narcotics certification criteria under the Foreign Assistance Act of 1961.
6. the extent to which the country has taken steps to become a party to and implements the Inter-American Convention Against Corruption.
7. the extent to which the country applied transparent, nondiscriminatory and competitive procedures in government procurement, and contribute to efforts in international for to develop an implement rules on transparency in government procurement.

== Customs-Related Eligibility Determination ==
In addition to presidential eligibility designations based on the criteria described above, the CBTPA requires an additional determination that countries have implemented or be making substantial progress towards implementing certain customs procedures based on those contained in the NAFTA.

The proclamation delegated authority for these additional determinations to United States Trade representative.

== Eligibility Review Process ==
The USTR-chaired Trade Policy Staff Committee (TPSC) conducted a review of countries' eligibility for CBTPA preferences, taking into account the criteria established in the Act. This review relied upon information provided by U.S. embassies and other reliable sources, such as the International Labour Organization. In addition, the committee took into account public comments regarding the eligibility review, solicited through a Federal Register notice published June 19, 2000. The TPSC received 206 comments in response to the notice.

Through a series of meetings, the committee identified a number of concerns and identified policy objectives to be pursued with the relevant governments.

The eligibility review process involved direct issue-specific advocacy with a majority of the countries that were potentially eligible. In addition, objectives related to intellectual property protection, worker rights, implementation of WTO agreements, and anti-corruption guidelines were pursued with a range of countries.

The review concluded that Caribbean Basin countries satisfied criteria regarding the worst forms of child labor. However, several countries were urged to expand on efforts to combat all forms of child labor.

== Specific eligibility concerns ==
=== Guatemala: additional review of worker rights issues ===
The review of Guatemala's eligibility for the enhanced CBI preferences involved extensive consideration of the worker rights situation in that country. The United States raised specific concerns with respect to anti-union violence, including a 1999 incident in which armed vigilantes threatened and kidnapped leaders of a banana workers' union who were protesting the illegal dismissal of 900 workers.

Guatemala's government was asked to pass revisions to the labor code, and to provide a commitment to continual improvements in law enforcement and judicial administration related to the protection of worker rights. Guatemala's government facilitated negotiations to reemploy the 900 fired workers, suspended operating licenses of companies that had violated labor code provisions and introduced legislation to align the country's labor laws with ILO recommendations.

On that basis of those actions and other assurances, Guatemala was designated a CBTPA Beneficiary Country. However, Guatemala's CBTPA beneficiary status was to be reviewed in April 2001s.

=== Worker rights monitoring in El Salvador, Honduras, and Nicaragua ===
Worker rights issues were also pursued in the context of the CBTPA eligibility review of El Salvador, Honduras, and Nicaragua.

In relation to El Salvador, the United States raised concerns regarding the effect of certain privatization programs in restricting union activity, as well as excessive legal formalities for establishing trade unions.

In Honduras, the United States focused on the government's efforts to revise the Honduran labor code in line with ILO recommendations.

In Nicaragua, the U.S. expressed particular concern with anti-union activity at two apparel factories in the Las Mercedes Free Trade Zone, and successfully sought the government's assurances that workers at those factories would be informed of their rights under Nicaragua's Labor Code.

In each of these cases, the governments in question provided responses that address U.S. concerns. Nonetheless, the Administration considered worker rights practices in these countries should be subject to ongoing monitoring and a commitment to discuss worker rights concerns again by June 30, 2001.

== Reception ==
Concerns were raised at times about the benefit of the agreement to the United States.

== Reauthorisation ==
In 2019, a bill was introduced to reauthorise the Act.
