= Caribbean Basin Initiative =

The Caribbean Basin Initiative (CBI), a trade initiative initiated by the 1983 Caribbean Basin Economic Recovery Act (CBERA), is a United States program. The CBI came into effect on January 1, 1984, and aimed to provide several tariff and trade benefits to many Central American and Caribbean countries. Provisions in the CBERA prevented the United States from extending preferences to CBI countries that it judged to be contrary to its interests or that had expropriated American property.

The Caribbean Basin Economic Recovery Expansion Act of 1990, known as "CBI II", made the CBI permanent. However, once the United States entered into the North American Free Trade Agreement (NAFTA) in 1994 with Mexico it became easier for Mexico to export its products to the United States. CBI countries had lost their advantage relative to Mexico, a major competitor in industries such as textiles and apparel, so they sought to increase their own preferences and achieve "NAFTA parity". Those efforts were not successful until the 2000 Caribbean Basin Trade Partnership Act, which was broadened in 2002. Several exports from the region continue to receive preferential status in the United States, however those preferences will likely be replaced by bilateral free trade agreements, and possibly by the proposed Free Trade Area of the Americas.

== Impact on farmers in Haiti ==
In the early 1980's, Haiti was self-sufficient in the field of rice production. However, the CBI called for liberalizing Haiti's economy and re-allocating nearly one-third of domestic Haitian food production toward export crops, and as a result of the subsequent shrinking of the rice industry and inundation of the market with cheap imported rice subsidized by the US government, Haitian farmers found their livelihoods crippled as they could not compete with the subsidized "Miami rice". Subsequently, rice production in Haiti plummeted, and many rural Haitians employed throughout the rice industry lost their source of income. However, American rice producers that took in government subsidies and dumped their product on Haiti, where tariffs on rice imports shrank from 35% to 3%, benefited greatly financially.

== See also ==
- Agriculture in Haiti
- Caribbean Basin Trade and Partnership Act
- Latin American debt crisis
- Latin American economy
- Rice production in Haiti
