= Aviation biofuel =

Sustainable fuel used to power aircraft

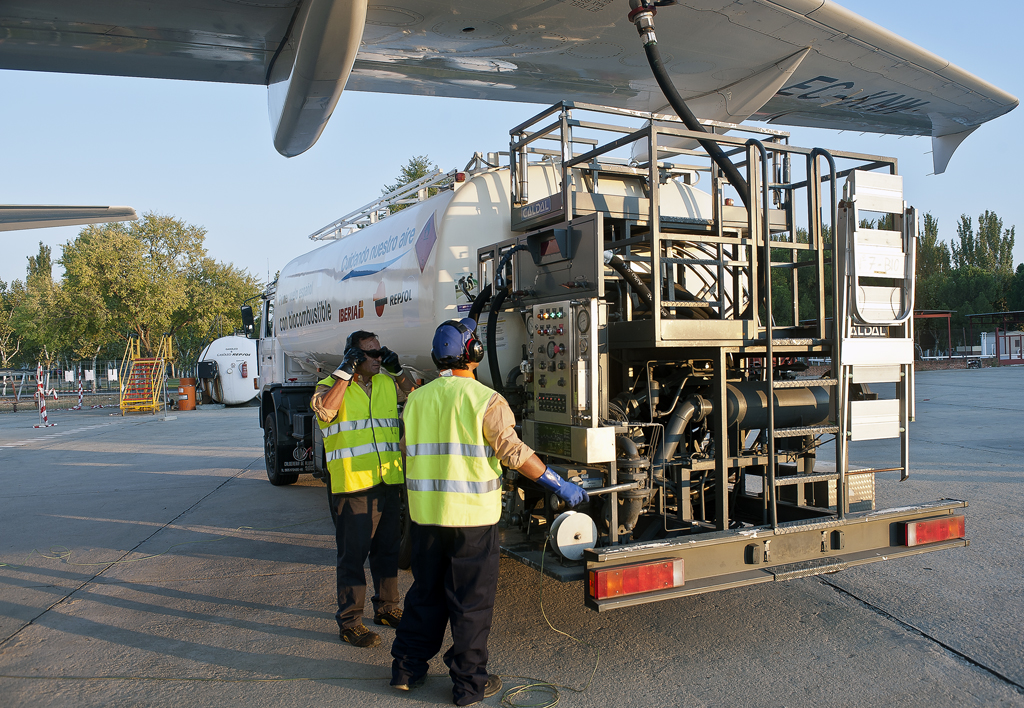
Refueling an Airbus A320 with biofuel in 2011

An aviation biofuel (also known as bio-jet fuel, bio-aviation fuel (BAF), semi-synthetic jet fuel, or sustainable aviation fuel (SAF)) is a biofuel used to power aircraft. The International Air Transport Association (IATA) considers it a key element in reducing the environmental impact of aviation. Aviation biofuel can be used to decarbonize otherwise hard-to-decarbonise medium and long-haul air travel via "drop-in-replacement" which does not require extensive modification to aircraft engine design. Synthetic paraffinic kerosene (SPK) refers to any non-petroleum-based hydrocarbon mixture designed as a blending component or complete replacement of kerosene jet fuel.

Not all bio-fuels are produced in a sustainable manner. Typically sustainable aviation fuel is certified as being sustainable by a third-party organisation and may benefit from emissions trading or carbon-credit schemes depending on local laws.

Biofuels are biomass-derived fuels from plants, animals, or waste; depending on which type of biomass is used, they could lower CO_{2} emissions by 20–98% compared to conventional jet fuel. The first test flight using blended biofuel was in 2008, and in 2011, blended fuels with 50% biofuels were allowed on commercial flights. In 2023 SAF production was 600 million liters, representing 0.2% of global jet fuel use. By 2024, SAF production was to increase to 1.3 billion liters (1 million tonnes), representing 0.3% of global jet fuel consumption and 11% of global renewable fuel production. This increase came as major US production facilities delayed their ramp-up until 2025, having initially been expected to reach 1.9 billion liters.

Aviation biofuel can be produced from upgraded plant or animal sources such as Jatropha, algae, tallows, waste oils, palm oil, Babassu, and Camelina (bio-SPK); from solid biomass using pyrolysis processed with a Fischer–Tropsch process (FT-SPK); with an alcohol-to-jet (ATJ) process from waste fermentation; or from synthetic biology through a solar reactor. Pathways which use electricity-derived hydrogen as a feedstock are called Electrofuels or e-fuels. Small piston engines can be modified to burn ethanol as a replacement for aviation gasoline.

SAF technology faces significant challenges due to feedstock constraints. The oils and fats used in production of hydrotreated esters and fatty acids (HEFA), crucial for SAF production, are in limited supply as demand increases. Although advanced e-fuels technology, which combines waste CO_{2} with clean hydrogen, presents a promising solution, it is still under development and comes with high costs. To overcome these issues, SAF developers are exploring more readily available feedstocks such as woody biomass and agricultural and municipal waste, aiming to produce lower-carbon jet fuel more sustainably and efficiently.

== History ==
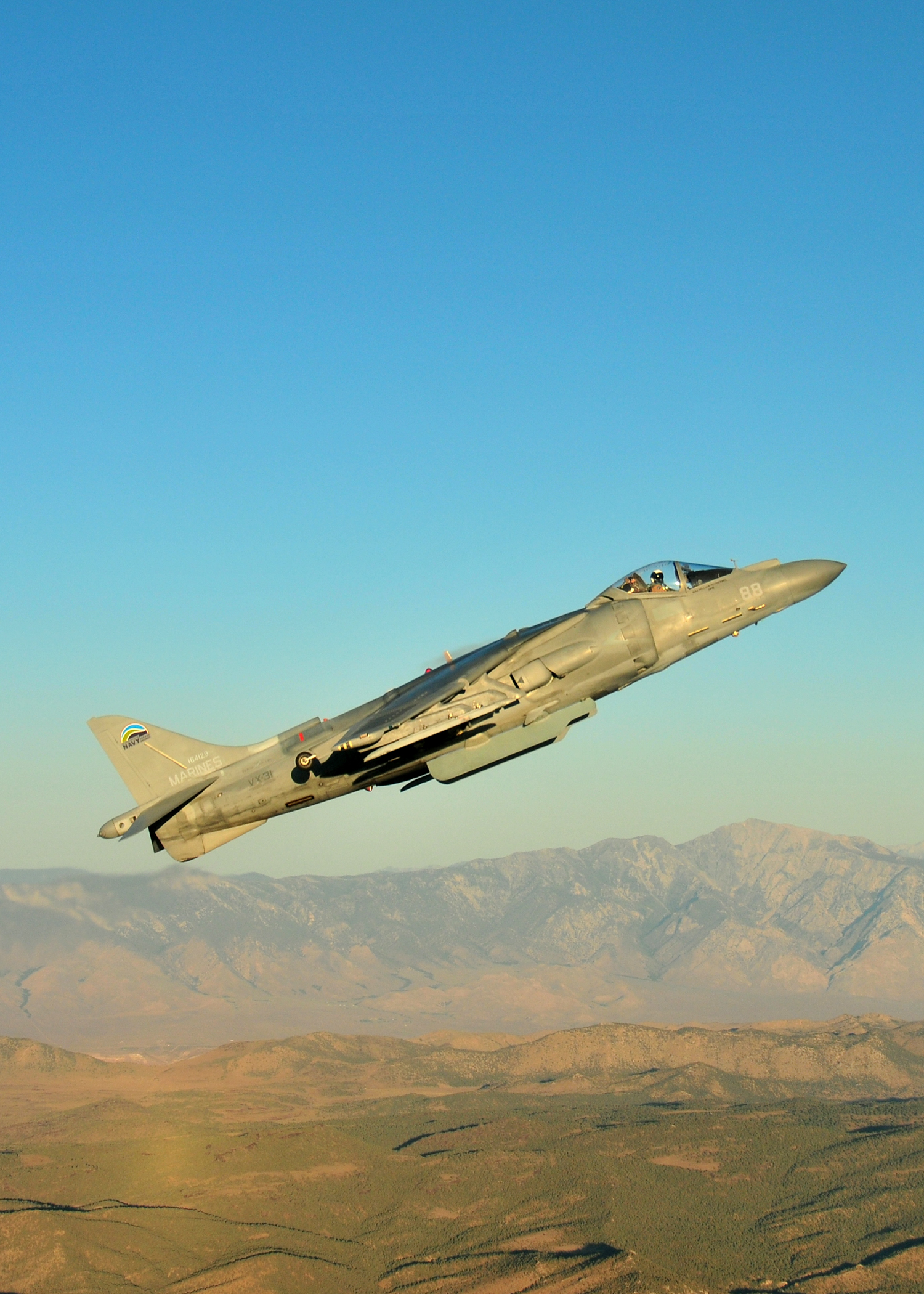
US Marine Corps AV-8B Harrier II test flight using a 50–50 biofuel blend in 2011

=== Technical development ===
The use of vegetable oils as a feedstock for aviation fuel has been studied for decades. Dunn (2001) highlighted the potential of vegetable oils as alternative jet fuel sources, which fundamentally underpins the modern HEFA pathway.

By 2015, cultivation of fatty acid methyl esters and alkenones from the algae, Isochrysis, was under research, and a method was patented in 2023.

By 2022, 90% of biofuel was made from sugarcane and oilseed grown only for this purpose. Between 2023 and 2025, the proportion made from used cooking oils and tallow increased to 23%.

Some perspectives suggest that to overcome these economic challenges, SAF production should be integrated into biorefineries that also foster the production of renewable chemicals, thereby diversifying revenue streams.

=== Flights using biofuels ===
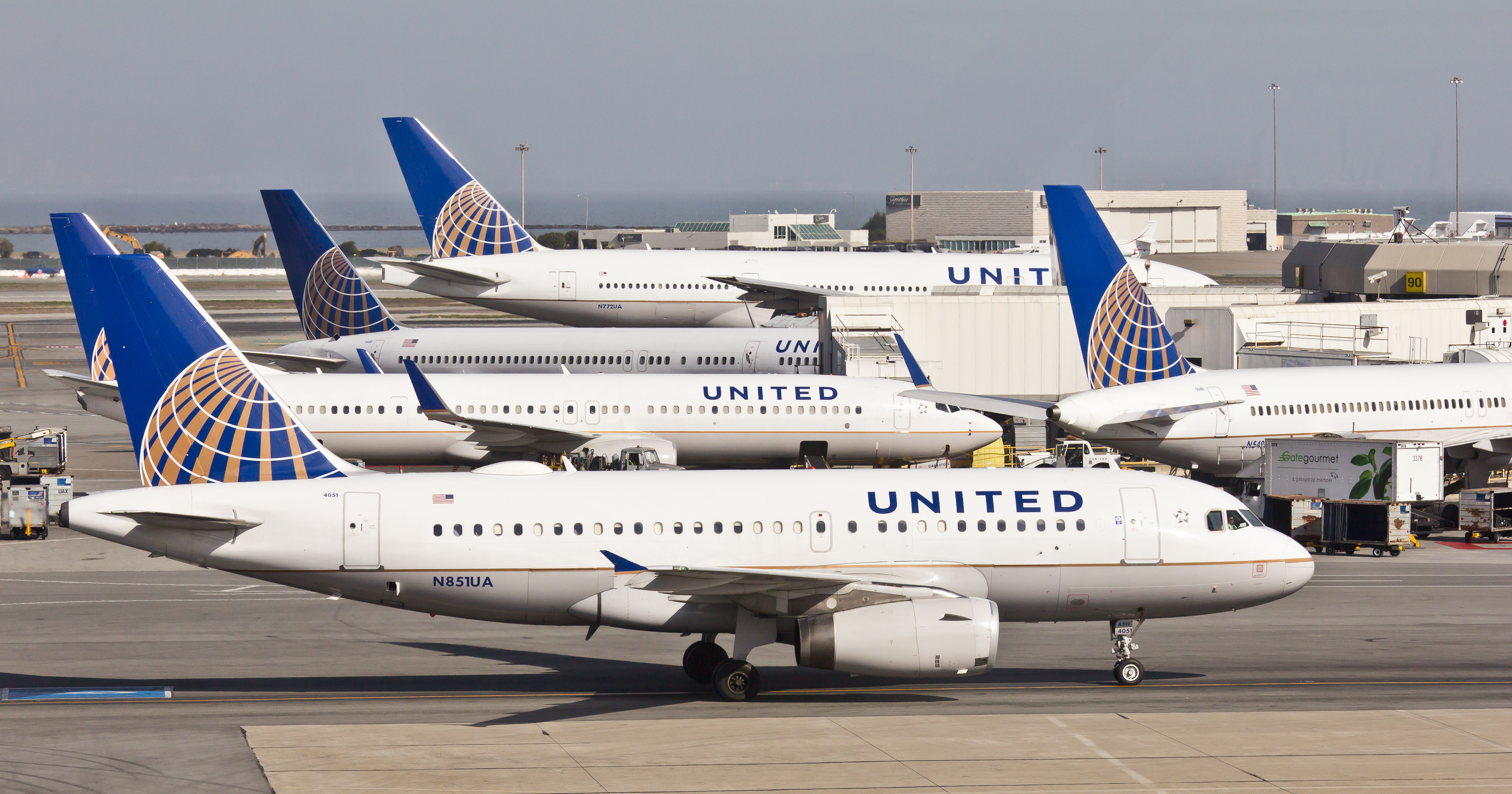
In 2019, United Airlines purchased up to 10 million US gallons (38,000 m^{3}) of SAF from World Energy over two years.

The first flight using blended biofuel took place in 2008. Virgin Atlantic used it to fly a commercial airliner, using feedstocks such as algae. The Sustainable Aviation Fuel Users Group was formed in September 2008. It gathers 25 airlines. All members have signed a Sustainability Pledge and are members of the Roundtable of Sustainable Biofuels (RSB) or ISEAL Alliance. That year, Boeing was co-chair of the Algal Biomass Organization, joined by air carriers and biofuel technology developer UOP LLC (Honeywell). In 2023 Virgin Atlantic completed "Flight 100", a 3543 mile flight from London Heathrow to New York JFK using a Boeing 787, which was the world’s first transatlantic flight flown on 100% Sustainable Aviation Fuel (SAF) by a commercial airline.

=== Development of Standard Specifications ===
By June 2011, the revised Specification for Aviation Turbine Fuel Containing Synthesized Hydrocarbons (ASTM D7566) allowed commercial airlines to blend up to 50% biofuels with conventional jet fuel. The safety and performance of jet fuel used in passenger flights is certified by ASTM International. Biofuels were approved for commercial use after a multi-year technical review from aircraft makers, engine manufacturers and oil companies. Thereafter some airlines experimented with biofuels on commercial flights. As of February 2025, eight annexes to D7566 were published, including various biofuel types:

- Fischer-Tropsch Synthetic Paraffinic Kerosene (FT-SPK, 2009)
- Hydroprocessed Esters and Fatty Acids Synthetic Paraffinic Kerosene (HEFA-SPK, 2011)
- usHydroprocessed Fermented Sugars to Synthetic Isoparaffins (HFS-SIP, 2014)
- Fischer-Tropsch Synthetic Paraffinic Kerosene with Aromatics (FT-SPK/A, 2015)
- Alcohol to Jet Synthetic Paraffinic Kerosene (ATJ-SPK, 2016)
- Catalytic Hydrothermolysis Synthesized Kerosene (CH-SK, or CHJ; 2020)
- Alcohol to Jet Synthetic Kerosene with Aromatics (ATJ-SKA, 2025)

=== SAF Targets ===
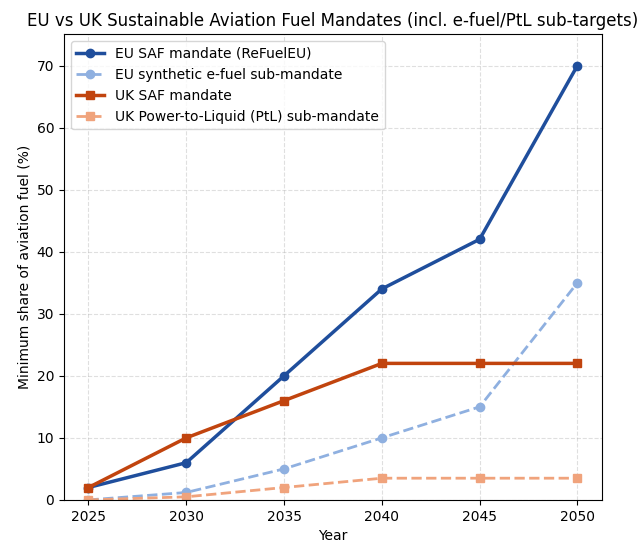
ReFuel EU and UK SAF Mandate (with e-fuel/PtL subtargets) 2025 - 2050

In 2009, the IATA committed to achieving carbon-neutral growth by 2020, and to halve carbon emissions by 2050.

In 2010, Boeing announced a target 1% of global aviation fuels by 2015.

In fall 2016, the International Civil Aviation Organization announced plans for multiple measures including the development and deployment of sustainable aviation fuels.

Biofuel provider Solena filed for bankruptcy in 2015.

In 2019, 0.1% of fuel was SAF: The International Air Transport Association (IATA) supported the adoption of Sustainable Aviation fuel, aiming in 2019 for 2% share by 2025: 7 million m^{3} (1.8 billion US gal).

By 2016, Thomas Brueck of Munich TU was forecasting that algaculture could provide 3–5% of jet fuel needs by 2050.

In early 2021, Boeing's CEO Dave Calhoun said drop-in sustainable aviation fuels are "the only answer between now and 2050" to reduce carbon emissions. In May 2021, the International Air Transport Association (IATA) set a goal for the aviation industry to achieve net-zero carbon emissions by 2050 with SAF as the key component.

DHL achieved a 10% SAF blending ratio within their air cargo operations in 2025 and aims to increase the share of SAF to 30% by 2030.

The European Commission's ReFuel EU Aviation initiative sets requirements for aviation fuel suppliers to gradually increase the share of SAF blended into the conventional aviation fuel supplied at EU airports. It requires 6% of all aviation fuel supplied at EU airports to come from sustainable aviation fuels by 2030, rising to 20% by 2035, and reaching 70% by 2050. A percentage of fuels is required to be e-fuels, rising from 1.2% in 2030 to 35% in 2050.

The UK government's SAF Mandate requires 10% of aviation fuel to come from sustainable sources by 2030 and rising to 20% by 2040. A sub-percentage of fuel is required to come from power-to-liquid technologies (essentially the same as the EU e-fuels sub-target), rising from 0.2% in 2028 to 3.5% in 2040.

=== Grants and Investments ===
In December 2011, the FAA awarded US$7.7 million to eight companies to develop drop-in sustainable fuels, especially from alcohols, sugars, biomass, and organic matter such as pyrolysis oils, within its CAAFI and CLEEN programs.

Dozens of companies received hundreds of millions in venture capital from 2005 to 2012 to extract fuel oil from algae, some promising competitively-priced fuel by 2012 and production of 1 billion US gal (3.8 million m^{3}) by 2012-2014. By 2017 most companies had disappeared or changed their business plans to focus on other markets.

The 2022 Inflation Reduction Act introduced the Fueling Aviation's Sustainable Transition (FAST) Grant Program. The program provides $244.5 million in grants for SAF-related "production, transportation, blending, and storage." In November, 2022, sustainable aviation fuels were a topic at COP26.

On 21 October 2025, Airbus and the Cathay Group announced a co-investment partnership of up to US$70 million to support the development of sustainable aviation fuel production in Asia and globally.

== Production ==
Jet fuel is a mixture of various hydrocarbons. The mixture is restricted by product requirements, for example, freezing point and smoke point. Jet fuels are sometimes classified as kerosene or naphtha-type. Kerosene-type fuels include Jet A, Jet A-1, JP-5 and JP-8. Naphtha-type jet fuels, sometimes referred to as "wide-cut" jet fuel, include Jet B and JP-4.

"Drop-in" biofuels are biofuels that are interchangeable with conventional fuels. Deriving "drop-in" jet fuel from bio-based sources is ASTM approved via two routes: blending and co-processing. ASTM has found it safe to blend in 50% SPK into regular jet fuels. Tests have been done with blending synthetic paraffinic kerosene (SPK) in considerably higher concentrations.

HEFA-SPK
Hydroprocessed Esters and Fatty Acids Synthetic Paraffinic Kerosine (HEFA-SPK) is a specific type of hydrotreated vegetable oil fuel. The first to be considered mature technology by 2019. HEFA-SPK was approved by Altair Engineering for use in 2011. HEFA-SPK is produced by the deoxygenation and hydroprocessing of the feedstock fatty acids of vegetable oils such as jatropha, and camelina, algae, or animal fats such as tallow.
The Diamond Green Diesel facility in Port Arthur, Texas, operated by Valero Energy, began producing SAF in late 2024, using the HEFA-SPK process.
FT-SPK
Fischer–Tropsch Synthetic Paraffinic Kerosene, which is made from syngas. The syngas can be bio-derived, for example by pyrolysis gasification of solid biomass. Has been commercialized in 2024.
ATJ-SPK
Alcohol-to-Jet Synthetic Paraffinic Kerosene (ATJ-SPK) is a proven pathway to deliver bio-based, low-carbon fuel. The alcohol-to-jet (ATJ) pathway takes alcohols such as ethanol or butanol and de-oxygenates and processes them into jet fuels. Companies such as LanzaTech have created ATJ-SPK from CO_{2} in flue gases. The ethanol is produced from CO in the flue gases using microbes such as Clostridium autoethanogenum. In 2016 LanzaTech demonstrated its technology at Pilot scale in NZ – using Industrial waste gases from the steel industry as a feedstock. Gevo developed technology to retrofit existing ethanol plants to produce isobutanol.

=== Certified processes ===
Abbreviation	Conversion Process	Possible Feedstocks	Blending Ratio	Commercialization Proposals / Projects
HEFA-SPK	Synthesized paraffinic kerosene produced from hydroprocessed esters and fatty acids	Bio-Oils, Animal Fat, Recycled Oils	50%	World Energy, Universal Oil Products, Neste, Dynamic Fuels, EERC
FT-SPK	Fischer-Tropsch hydroprocessed synthesized paraffinic kerosene	Coal, Natural Gas, Biomass	50%	Fulcrum Bioenergy, Red Rock Biofuels, SG Preston, Kaidi Finland, Sasol, Shell Oil Company, Syntroleum
SIP-HFS	Synthesized kerosene isoparaffins produced from hydroprocessed fermented sugars	Biomass-derived sugar	10%	Amyris (company), TotalEnergies
SPK/A	Synthesized kerosene with aromatics derived by alkylation of light aromatics from non-petroleum sources	Coal, Natural Gas, Biomass	50%	Sasol
ATJ-SPK	Alcohol-to-jet synthetic paraffinic kerosene	Biomass-derived ethanol or isobutanol	50%	Gevo, Cobalt, Universal Oil Products, Lanzatech, Swedish Biofuels, Byogy
Co-Processing	Co-processing of esters and fatty acids alongside traditional fossil feedstocks in refinery units such as hydrotreater, hydrocracker, or FCC.	Bio-Oils, Animal Fat, Recycled Oils, FT wax	10% 30%	In use by various traditional oil & gas companies

=== Alternative production routes ===
Several research initiatives and companies have reported work on technologies intended to produce synthetic hydrocarbons and sustainable aviation fuels (SAF).

The SUN-to-LIQUID project (2016-2019) was a European Union Horizon 2020-funded research initiative that demonstrated the production of sustainable aviation fuel directly from sunlight, water, and carbon dioxide. The project utilised a solar thermochemical process involving a high-temperature solar reactor to produce synthesis gas (syngas), which was then converted into jet fuel through Fischer-Tropsch synthesis. On June 13, 2019, researchers at the IMDEA Energy Institute in Móstoles, Spain successfully demonstrated the complete production chain, marking a significant milestone in solar fuel technology. The project consortium included partners from seven European countries and Switzerland, led by Bauhaus Luftfahrt, and received support from the Swiss State Secretariat for Education, Research and Innovation. While the demonstration proved the technical feasibility of producing drop-in aviation fuel from renewable sources without competing for agricultural land, the technology remained at an early stage with challenges related to scaling and economic viability requiring further development.

Using algae to make jet fuel remains an emerging technology. Companies working on algae jet fuel include Solazyme, Honeywell UOP, Solena, Sapphire Energy, Imperium Renewables, and Aquaflow Bionomic Corporation. Universities working on algae jet fuel are Arizona State University and Cranfield University. Major investors for algae-based SPK research are Boeing, Honeywell/UOP, Air New Zealand, Continental Airlines, Japan Airlines, and General Electric.

Alder Fuels developed a technology to convert lignocellulosic biomass, including forestry and agricultural residues, into a hydrocarbon-rich intermediate product called "greencrude" through pyrolysis. This greencrude can subsequently be processed in conventional petroleum refineries using existing infrastructure to produce drop-in aviation and transportation fuels. The company's process utilises waste biomass feedstocks that do not compete with food production, addressing one of the sustainability concerns associated with first-generation biofuels.

Universal Fuel Technologies developed Flexiforming technology, a catalytic process designed to convert various feedstocks, including byproducts from existing renewable fuel production, into sustainable aviation fuel. The technology has feedstock flexibility, allowing for the processing of multiple biomass-derived inputs through a single conversion pathway.

Arcadia eFuels developed a power-to-liquid facility at the port of Vordingborg, Denmark, utilising a process that combines water electrolysis powered by renewable electricity with carbon dioxide capture to produce synthetic aviation fuel. The process involves generating green hydrogen through electrolysis, which is then combined with captured CO2 to create synthesis gas (syngas), subsequently converted to jet fuel via Fischer-Tropsch or similar gas-to-liquid processes.

=== Piston engines ===
Small piston engines can be modified to burn ethanol.

Swift Fuel (UL102; approx. 85% mesitylene and 15% isopentane), a non-alcoholic biofuel alternative to avgas, was approved as a test fuel by ASTM International in December 2009.

=== Technical challenges ===
A number of technical challenges and additional requirements exist for manufacturing, distribution, and use of SAF.

==== Aromatics and cycloalkanes ====
Nitrile-based rubber materials expand in the presence of aromatic compounds found in conventional petroleum fuel. Pure biofuels without petroleum and paraffin-based additives may cause rubber seals and hoses to shrink. Synthetic rubber substitutes that are not adversely affected by biofuels, such as Viton, for seals and hoses are available.

As of May 2025 SAF is generally required to be blended with fossil fuel—because jet fuel needs cycloalkanes and aromatics, which are generally deficient in SAF; as well as the more prevalent in SAF n-alkanes and isoalkanes.

==== Anti-Oxidant ====
ASTM D7566 mandates addition of anti-oxidant additives for SAF derived via certain pathways such as HEFA.

==== Low Temperature Viscosity ====
Due to the higher viscosity of some types of SPK, ASTM D7566 includes an additional kinematic viscosity limit of 12mm²/s at -40°C for certification of SAF.

==== Microbiological Growth ====
The United States Air Force found harmful bacteria and fungi in their biofueled aircraft, and used pasteurization to disinfect them.

== Economics ==
Economic viability has historically been a major barrier to SAF adoption. Early assessments by Lander and Reif (1986) noted that producing jet fuel from alternative sources would require significant capital investment compared to conventional petroleum refining.

In 2019 the International Energy Agency forecast SAF production should grow from 18 to 75 billion litres between 2025 and 2040, representing a 5% to 19% share of aviation fuel. By 2019, fossil jet fuel production cost was $0.3-0.6 per L given a $50–100 crude oil barrel, while aviation biofuel production cost was $0.7-1.6, needing a $110–260 crude oil barrel to break-even. As of 2024, SAF represents just 0.3% of global aviation fuel.

As of 2020 aviation biofuel was more expensive than fossil jet kerosene, considering aviation taxation and subsidies at that time.

As of a 2021 analysis, VFA-SAF break-even cost was $2.50/US gal ($0.66/L). This number was generated considering credits and incentives at the time, such as California's LCFS (Low Carbon Fuel Standard) credits and the US Environmental Protection Agency (EPA) Renewable Fuel Standard incentives.

In countries with high biomass availability like Brazil, the primary pathways identified for decarbonization are Hydroprocessed Esters and Fatty Acids (HEFA) and Alcohol-to-Jet (AtJ).

=== Market implementation ===
By 2019, Virgin Australia had fueled more than 700 flights and flown more than one million kilometers, domestic and international, using Gevo's alcohol-to-jet fuel. Virgin Atlantic was working to regularly use fuel derived from the waste gases of steel mills, with LanzaTech. British Airways wanted to convert household waste into jet fuel with Velocys. United Airlines committed to 900 million US gal (3,400,000 m^{3}) of sustainable aviation fuel for 10 years from Fulcrum BioEnergy (of its 4.1 billion US gal (16,000,000 m^{3}) fuel consumption in 2018), after a $30 million investment in 2015.

From 2020, Qantas planned to use a 50/50 blend of SG Preston's biofuel on its Los Angeles-Australia flights. SG Preston also planned to provide fuel to JetBlue over 10 years. At its sites in Singapore, Rotterdam and Porvoo, Finland's Neste expected to improve its renewable fuel production capacity from 2.7 to 3.0 million t (6.0 to 6.6 billion lb) a year by 2020, and to increase its Singapore capacity by 1.3 million t (2.9 billion lb) to reach 4.5 million t (9.9 billion lb) in 2022 by investing €1.4 billion ($1.6 billion).

By 2020, International Airlines Group had invested $400 million to convert waste into sustainable aviation fuel with Velocys.

United Airlines has expanded SAF use across multiple airports worldwide, including Amsterdam in 2022, San Francisco and London in 2023, and Chicago O'Hare and Los Angeles in 2024.

In March 2024, regular use of SAF began in the Northeastern United States at John F. Kennedy International Airport, as part of a new effort by JetBlue. Southwest Airlines began using sustainable jet fuel at Chicago Midway International Airport in October 2024.

Fuel supplier Avfuel expanded its SAF offerings in Texas in November 2025 through its fixed-base operator (FBO) partner Million Air at Austin-Bergstrom International Airport (AUS). The companies had already partnered earlier in the year to provide SAF at an FBO at the Albany International Airport (ALB) in New York.

Less than 1% of global liquid biofuels are currently used for aviation purposes, with biojet fuel fueling less than 0.5% of all flights; most is used for road transport, but even if the entire biofuel production was allocated to aviation, this would provide, at most, one-third of demand.

As of 2022, some 450,000 flights had used sustainable fuels as part of the fuel mix, although such fuels were ~3x more expensive than the traditional fossil jet fuel or kerosene. In 2023, SAFs account for less than 0.1% of all aviation fuels consumed. Throughout 2024, Alaska Airlines was the leader among U.S. airlines in SAF implementation, accounting for 0.68% of its fuel usage. Other major airlines including United, Delta and JetBlue used SAF in roughly .3% of fuel.

== Sustainability Certification ==
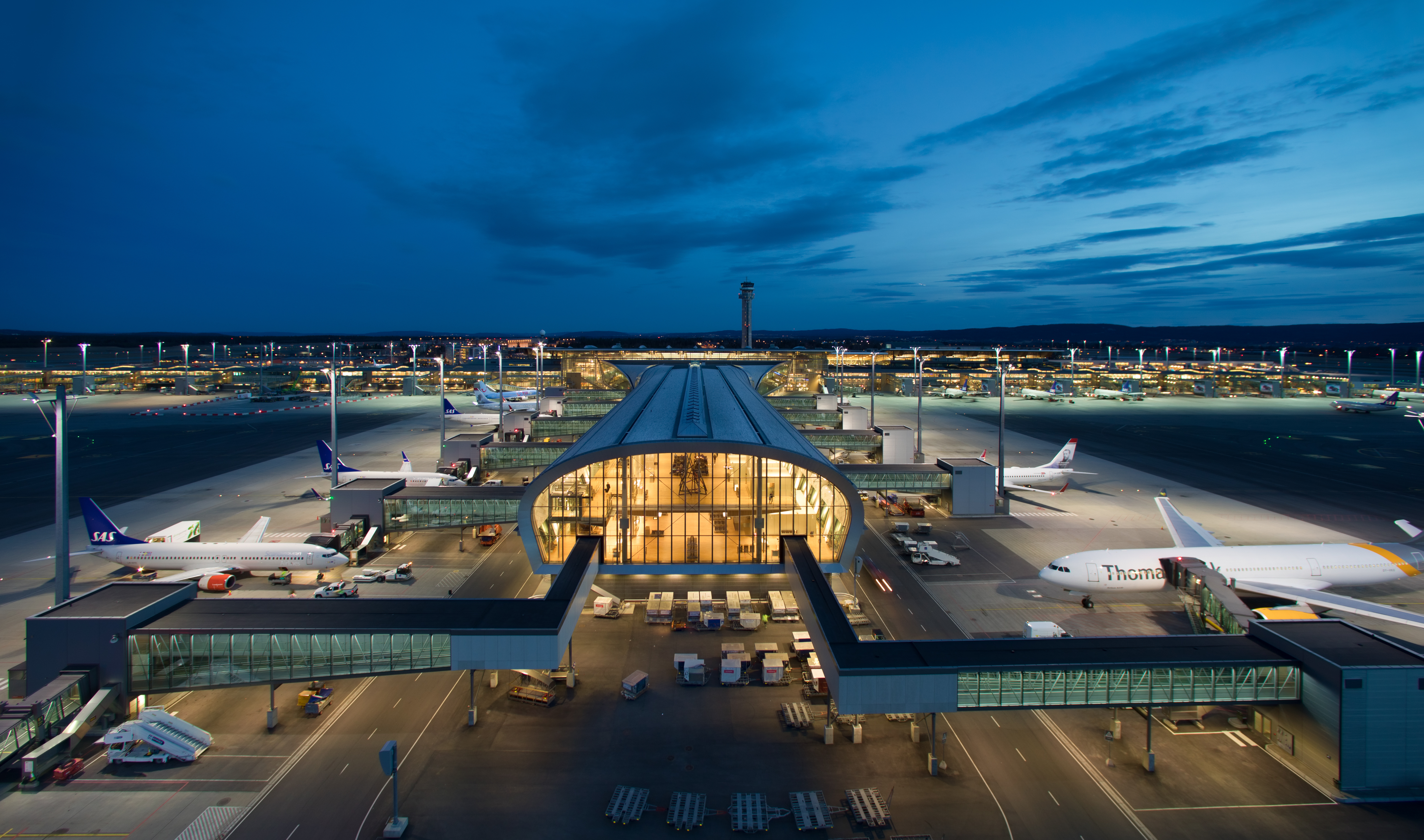
In 2016, Oslo Airport became the first international airport to offer sustainable aviation fuel as part of the fuel mix.

Sustainable biofuels do not use food crops, prime agricultural land or fresh water. Sustainable aviation fuel (SAF) is certified by a third-party such as the Roundtable For Sustainable Biofuels.

A SAF sustainability certification ensures that the product satisfies criteria focused on environmental, social, and economic "triple-bottom-line" considerations. Under many emission regulation schemes, such as the European Union Emissions Trading Scheme (EUTS), a certified SAF product may be exempted from carbon compliance liability costs. This marginally improves SAF's economic competitiveness versus fossil-based fuel.

The first reputable body to launch a sustainable biofuel certification system was the European-based Roundtable on Sustainable Biomaterials (RSB) NGO. Leading airlines and other signatories to the Sustainable Aviation Fuel Users Group (SAFUG) pledged to support RSB as their preferred certification provider.

Some SAF pathways procured RIN pathways under the United States's renewable fuel standard which can serve as an implicit certification if the RIN is a Q-RIN.

EU RED II Recast (2018)
Greenhouse gas emissions from sustainable fuels must be lower than those from the fuels they replace: at least 50% for production built before 5 October 2015, 60% after that date and 65% after 2021. Raw materials cannot be sourced from land with high biodiversity or high carbon stocks (i.e. primary and protected forests, biodiversity-rich grasslands, wetlands and peatlands). Other sustainability issues are set out in the Governance Regulation and may be covered voluntarily.

ICAO 'CORSIA'
GHG Reduction - Criterion 1: lifecycle reductions of at least 10% compared to fossil fuel. Carbon Stock - Criterion 1: not produced from biomass obtained from land whose uses changed after 1 January 2008 from primeval forests, wetlands or peatlands, as all these lands have high carbon stocks. Criterion 2: For land use changes after 1 January 2008, (using IPCC land categories), if emissions from direct land use change (DLUC) exceed the default value of the induced land use change (ILUC), the value of the DLUC replaces the default (ILUC) value.

=== Global impact ===
As emissions trading schemes and other carbon compliance regimes emerge, certain biofuels are likely to be exempted ("zero-rated") by governments from compliance due to their closed-loop nature, if they can demonstrate appropriate credentials. For example, in the EUTS, SAFUG's proposal was accepted that only fuels certified as sustainable by the RSB or similar body would be zero-rated. SAFUG was formed by a group of interested airlines in 2008 under the auspices of Boeing Commercial Airplanes. Member airlines represented more than 15% of the industry, and signed a pledge to work towards SAF.

In addition to SAF certification, the integrity of aviation biofuel producers and their products could be assessed by means such as Richard Branson's Carbon War Room, or the Renewable Jet Fuels initiative. The latter works with companies such as LanzaTech, SG Biofuels, AltAir, Solazyme, and Sapphire.

Along with her co-authors, Candelaria Bergero of the University of California's Earth System Science Department stated that "main challenges to scaling up such sustainable fuel production include technology costs and process efficiencies", and widespread production would undermine food security and land use.

== International regulations ==
Mandates put in place by certain countries or regions related to SAFs aim to increase the usage and production of biofuels as well as decrease carbon emissions, greenhouse gases, and other pollutants. The first SAF mandates put in place were the UK mandate and ReFuelEU Aviation, both going into full effect on January 1, 2025. Often the mandates will include blending quotas, a required percentage of fuel that is SAF, enforce that airports supply SAFs, and other countries or regions will instead give incentives like subsidies or tax credits rather than introducing new rules.

=== ReFuelEU ===
ReFuelEU was officially adopted in 2023 and put into full effect January 1, 2025 by the European Union with the goal of increased SAF use in European aviation and reduced CO2 emissions from the European aviation industry. ReFuelEU mandates a 6% blending quota of SAFs for European airliners by 2030 up to 32% by 2040, SAFs must be made available for use by airliners at airports with seeing greater than 800,000 passengers and/or greater than 100,000 tons of freight, and 90% of refueling done by commercial airliners departing a European airport must be done within EU airports concerning annual required fuel. The final requirement is for the purpose of preventing fuel-tankering; when airliners refuel with more fuel than needed in other countries to avoid paying more expensive fuel costs at the destination, which also leads to increased CO2 emissions as the increased total weight also increases to total consumption and emissions output.

=== UK SAF Mandate ===
The UK SAF Mandate was officially signed into law by the UK Parliament in November 2024 and put into effect January 1, 2025. Similar to the goals of ReFuelEU, the Mandate primarily focuses on blending quotas for airliners. The UK Mandate sets a 2030 goal of 10% SAF blend, scaling up from 2% annually beginning 2025, and reaching 22% SAF fuel blend by 2040.

=== ProBioQAV ===
ProBioQAV, also known as the National Sustainable Aviation Fuel Program(Programa Nacional de Combustível Sustentável de Aviação in Portuguese), is the Brazilian SAF program adopted by the National Congress in March 2024 as part of the broader "Fuel of the Future" law. ProBioQAV focuses on achieving emissions-based progress via reduced CO2 emissions. The Program mandates that well-to-wake CO2 emissions, the emissions consisting of those from the full lifecycle of the fuel including production, circulation, and combustion, must be reduced by 1% on domestic flights annually, starting in 2027 and ending when the reduction is at 10% in 2037.

== Environmental impact ==
Plants absorb carbon dioxide as they grow, therefore plant-based biofuels emit only the same amount of greenhouse gases as they had previously absorbed. Biofuel production, processing, and transport, however, emit greenhouse gases, reducing the emissions savings. Biofuels with the most emission savings are those derived from photosynthetic algae (98% savings) although the technology is not developed, and those from non-food crops and forest residues (91–95% savings).

Jatropha oil, a non-food oil used as a biofuel, lowers CO_{2} emissions by 50–80% compared to Jet-A1, a kerosene-based fuel. Jatropha, used for biodiesel, can thrive on marginal land where most plants produce low yields. A life cycle assessment on jatropha estimated that biofuels could reduce greenhouse gas emissions by up to 85% if former agro-pastoral land is used, or increase emissions by up to 60% if natural woodland is converted.

Palm oil cultivation is constrained by scarce land resources and its expansion to forestland causes biodiversity loss, along with direct and indirect emissions due to land-use change. Neste Corporation's renewable products include a refining residue of food-grade palm oil, the oily waste skimmed from the palm oil mill's wastewater. Other Neste sources are used cooking oil from deep fryers and animal fats. Neste's sustainable aviation fuel is used by Lufthansa; Air France and KLM announced 2030 SAF targets in 2022 including multi-year purchase contracts totaling over 2.4 million tonnes of SAF from Neste, TotalEnergies, and DG Fuels.

Aviation fuel from wet waste-derived feedstock ("VFA-SAF") provides an additional environmental benefit. Wet waste consists of waste from landfills, sludge from wastewater treatment plants, agricultural waste, greases, and fats. Wet waste can be converted to volatile fatty acids (VFA's), which then can be catalytically upgraded to SAF. Wet waste is a low-cost and plentiful feedstock, with the potential to replace 20% of US fossil jet fuel. This lessens the need to grow crops specifically for fuel, which in itself is energy intensive and increases CO_{2} emissions throughout its life cycle. Wet waste feedstocks for SAF divert waste from landfills. Diversion has the potential to eliminate 17% of US methane emissions across all sectors. VFA-SAF's carbon footprint is 165% lower than fossil aviation fuel. This technology is in its infancy; although start-ups are working to make this a viable solution. Alder Renewables, BioVeritas, and ChainCraft are a few organizations committed to this.

NASA has determined that 50% aviation biofuel mixture can cut particulate emissions caused by air traffic by 50–70%. Biofuels do not contain sulfur compounds and thus do not emit sulfur dioxide. While, it may be true that the burning of biofuels do not emit sulfur compounds, some forms of production, such as pyrolysis, can in fact produce sulfur compounds and other pollutants. Some potential pollutants that could be released are hydrogen sulfide and different nitrogen compounds like hydrogen cyanide, ammonia, and nitrogen dioxide. There are other forms of biofuel production that may not have the same emissions.

Because of the scaling required to make aviation biofuel mainstream, the impact of land usage is a current hindrance to the growth of the biofuel industry. Potential solutions to this issue have begun to surface. For example, algae farms can produce a lot more biofuel per unit of area than crops. Trials of using algae as biofuel were carried out by Lufthansa and Virgin Atlantic as early as 2008, although there is little evidence that using algae is a reasonable source for jet biofuels. By 2015, cultivation of fatty acid methyl esters and alkenones from the algae, Isochrysis, was under research as a possible jet biofuel feedstock.

== See also ==
- Jet Fuel – Fossil fuel used to power jet turbine engines
- Biodiesel – Fuel made from vegetable oils or animal fats
- Fossil fuel phase-out – Gradual reduction of the use and production of fossil fuels
- List of emerging technologies – New technologies actively in development
- Vegetable oil fuel – Alternative fuel in diesel engines
- Fischer-Tropsch Process – Process used to convert carbon monoxide and hydrogen into liquid hydrocarbons
- Power-to-X – Process used to store electrical power in chemical form
