= Gevo =

U.S. chemical company

Gevo, Inc.
- Type: Public
- Traded as: Nasdaq: GEVO
- Industry: Renewable fuel, Biofuel
- Founded: 2005; 21 years ago
- Founder: Dr. Matthew Peters; Dr. Peter Meinhold; Dr. Frances Arnold
- Headquarters: Douglas County, Colorado, U.S.
- Area served: Worldwide
- Key people: Dr. Patrick Gruber (CEO)
- Products: Isobutanol (Biobutanol) and Hydrocarbon derivatives
- Revenue: ▼US$0.711 Million (Fiscal Year Ended December 31, 2021)
- Operating income: ▼ (US$60.090 Million) (Fiscal Year Ended December 31, 2021)
- Net income: ▼ (US$59.203 Million) (Fiscal Year Ended December 31, 2021)
- Total assets: ▲US$666.476 Million (Fiscal Year Ended December 31, 2021)
- Total equity: ▲US$547.255 Million (Fiscal Year Ended December 31, 2021)
- Number of employees: 99 (Fiscal Year Ended December 31, 2021)
- Website: https://gevo.com/

Gevo, Inc. is an American renewable chemicals and advanced biofuels company headquartered in unincorporated Douglas County, Colorado, in the Denver-Aurora metropolitan area. Gevo operates in the sustainability sector, pursuing a business model based on the concept of the "circular economy". The company develops bio-based alternatives to petroleum-based products using a combination of biotechnology and classical chemistry. Gevo uses the GREET model from Argonne National Laboratory as a basis for its measure of sustainability, with the goal of producing high-protein animal feed, corn-oil products, and energy-dense liquid hydrocarbons. Gevo is focused on converting sustainably grown raw materials, specifically No. 2 dent corn, into high-value protein and isobutanol, a primary building block for renewable hydrocarbons, including sustainable aviation fuel, renewable gasoline, and renewable diesel. Gevo markets these fuels as directly integrable on a “drop-in” basis into existing fuel and chemical products.

== The Circular Economy ==
Gevo's business model aims to reduce greenhouse gas emissions by incorporating renewable energies and sustainable processes. Gevo's business model incorporates the concept of the circular economy, as outlined in publicly available documents such as Gevo’s circular economy.

== Economics of Isobutanol Production ==
Isobutanol is a four-carbon (C_{4}) alcohol that can be directly used as a specialty chemical or a value-added fuel blendstock. It can also be converted into butenes. Butenes are primary hydrocarbon feedstocks that are used in the production of plastics, fibers, rubber, other polymers, and hydrocarbon fuels.

Isobutanol produced from renewable raw materials may be a competitive alternative source of C_{4} hydrocarbons for the petrochemical and refining industries. Isobutanol and its derivatives have potential applications in the global petrochemicals market. Manufacturers may replace petroleum-derived raw materials with isobutanol-derived raw materials. Additionally, the final products produced from isobutanol-based raw materials are chemically equivalent to those produced from petroleum-based raw materials and may help reduce the time to market adoption.

== Creating Food and Fuel While Sequestering Carbon in the Soil ==
Gevo uses no. 2 dent corn to create high-protein animal feed and isobutanol. The leftover starch from the corn is used to make isobutanol, which can be converted into energy-dense liquid hydrocarbons like sustainable aviation fuel, renewable gasoline, and renewable diesel.

== Target markets ==
Gevo's commercialization efforts are focused on the following markets:

- Isobutanol — Without any modification, isobutanol has applications as a specialty chemical and a fuel blendstock. In the fuel blendstock market, isobutanol can be used to replace high-value blendstocks, such as alkylate, and can be blended in conjunction with, or as a substitute for, ethanol and other widely used fuel oxygenates. In November 2010, Gevo became the first company to receive EPA (Environmental Protection Agency) certification for isobutanol as a fuel blendstock after meeting the EPA's standards under the Clean Air Act. While isobutanol can be used as a replacement for ethanol, its product properties are significantly different from ethanol's. As a gasoline blendstock, isobutanol's low Reid vapor pressure (RVP), high energy content, and low water solubility compared to ethanol make it a valuable product that can be sold directly to refineries and is compatible with existing engine and industry infrastructure, including pipeline assets. Isobutanol can also be sold for immediate use as a specialty solvent.
- Plastics, fibers, rubber. and other polymers — Isobutanol can be converted into a wide variety of hydrocarbons that form the basis for the production of many products, including rubber, lubricants, additives, methyl methacrylate, polypropylenes, polyesters, and polystyrene.
- Hydrocarbon Fuels — Alternatively, the hydrocarbons that can be produced from isobutanol can be used to manufacture jet and diesel fuel, as well as other hydrocarbon fuels. Airline companies that use Gevo’s jet fuel: Lufthansa, United Airlines, Etihad, Cathay Pacific Airways, Emirates, Japan Airlines, Korean Air, Atlas Air (November 2017)

== Controversies ==
In February 2022, a methane digester owned by Gevo located at Winding Meadows Dairy near Rock Valley, Iowa, spilled manure. This spill flowed across frozen fields into Lizard Creek, a tributary of the Rock River. As a result, 376,414 gallons of liquid manure entered the waterways. It was later discovered that Gevo did not have a license to operate the digester. Although the Iowa Department of Natural Resources fined the dairy farmer $10,000 for the spill, Gevo was not fined.
