= List of turbofan manufacturers =

Key players in the turbofan engine market include General Electric, Rolls-Royce, and Pratt & Whitney. General Electric and Safran of France have a joint venture, CFM International. Pratt & Whitney also have a joint venture, International Aero Engines with Japanese Aero Engine Corporation and MTU Aero Engines of Germany, specializing in engines for the Airbus A320 family. Pratt & Whitney and General Electric have a joint venture, Engine Alliance selling a range of engines for aircraft such as the Airbus A380.

For airliners and cargo aircraft, the in-service fleet in 2016 is 60,000 engines and should grow to 103,000 in 2035 with 86,500 deliveries according to Flight Global. A majority will be medium-thrust engines for narrow-body aircraft with 54,000 deliveries, for a fleet growing from 28,500 to 61,000. High-thrust engines for wide-body aircraft, worth 40–45% of the market by value, will grow from 12,700 engines to over 21,000 with 18,500 deliveries. The regional jet engines below 20,000 lb (89 kN) fleet will grow from 7,500 to 9,000 and the fleet of turboprops for airliners will increase from 9,400 to 10,200. The manufacturers market share should be led by CFM with 44% followed by Pratt & Whitney with 29% and then Rolls-Royce and General Electric with 10% each.

== USA ==
=== GE Aerospace ===
GE Aerospace (formerly GE Aviation, part of General Electric until becoming an independent public company in 2024) is a United States aircraft engine manufacturer. It produces turbofan engines for commercial, business, and military aircraft, including advanced military propulsion systems such as the XA100 adaptive-cycle engine.

=== Pratt & Whitney ===
Pratt & Whitney is third behind GE and Rolls-Royce in market share. The JT9D has the distinction of being chosen by Boeing to power the original Boeing 747 "Jumbo jet". The PW4000 series is the successor to the JT9D, and powers some Airbus A310, Airbus A300, Boeing 747, Boeing 767, Boeing 777, Airbus A330 and MD-11 aircraft. The PW4000 is certified for 180-minute ETOPS when used in twinjets. The first family has a 94-inch (2.4 m) fan diameter and is designed to power the Boeing 767, Boeing 747, MD-11, and the Airbus A300. The second family is the 100 inch (2.5 m) fan engine developed specifically for the Airbus A330 twinjet, and the third family has a diameter of 112-inch (2.8 m) designed to power Boeing 777. The Pratt & Whitney F119 and its derivative, the F135, power the United States Air Force's F-22 Raptor and the international F-35 Lightning II, respectively. Rolls-Royce are responsible for the lift fan which provides the F-35B variants with a STOVL capability. The F100 engine was first used on the F-15 Eagle and F-16 Fighting Falcon. Newer Eagles and Falcons also come with GE F110 as an option, and the two are in competition.

=== Williams International ===
Williams International is an American manufacturer of small gas turbine engines based in Pontiac, Michigan, United States. It produces jet engines for cruise missiles and small jet aircraft.

=== Honeywell Aerospace ===
Honeywell Aerospace is one of the largest manufacturer of aircraft engines and avionics, as well as a producer of auxiliary power units (APUs) and other aviation products. Headquartered in Phoenix, Arizona, it is a division of the Honeywell International conglomerate. Honeywell/ITEC F124 series is used in military jets, such as the Aero L-159 Alca and the Alenia Aermacchi M-346. The Honeywell HTF7000 series is used in the Bombardier Challenger 300 and the Gulfstream G280. The ALF502 and LF507 turbofans are produced by a partnership between Honeywell and China's state-owned Industrial Development Corporation. The partnership is called the International Turbine Engine Co.

=== Engine Alliance ===
Engine Alliance is a 50/50 joint venture between General Electric and Pratt & Whitney formed in August 1996 to develop, manufacture, sell, and support a family of modern technology aircraft engines for new high-capacity, long-range aircraft. The main application for such an engine, the GP7200, was originally the Boeing 747-500/600X projects, before these were cancelled owing to lack of demand from airlines. Instead, the GP7000 has been re-optimised for use on the Airbus A380 superjumbo. In that market it is competing with the Rolls-Royce Trent 900, the launch engine for the aircraft. The two variants are the GP7270 and the GP7277.

== United Kingdom ==
=== Rolls-Royce ===
Rolls-Royce is the second largest manufacturer of turbofans and is most noted for their RB211 and Trent series, as well as their joint venture engines for the Airbus A320 and McDonnell Douglas MD-90 families (IAE V2500 with Pratt & Whitney and others), the Panavia Tornado (Turbo-Union RB199) and the Boeing 717 (BR700). The Rolls-Royce AE 3007, developed by Allison Engine Company before its acquisition by Rolls-Royce, powers several Embraer regional jets. Rolls-Royce Trent 970s were the first engines to power the new Airbus A380. The famous thrust vectoring Pegasus – actually a Bristol Siddeley design taken on by Rolls-Royce when they took over that company – is the primary powerplant of the Harrier "Jump Jet" and its derivatives.

== France ==
=== Safran ===
Safran a prominent player in the aerospace industry, has achieved significant engine manufacturing milestones. Their portfolio includes engines like the CF6, powering aircraft such as the Boeing 767, Boeing 747, and Airbus A330. Notably, Safran's GE90 engine exclusively powers the Boeing 777, while the GEnx is developed for the Boeing 747-8, Boeing 787 Dreamliner, and proposed for the Airbus A350. In the military sector, Safran engines play a vital role, including the F110 powering 80% of the US Air Force's F-16 Fighting Falcons, and engines like the F404 and F414 in the Navy's F/A-18 Hornet and Super Hornet. Safran's commitment to collaboration is evident in their past joint development efforts, such as the F136 engine with Rolls-Royce and General Electric for the Joint Strike Fighter. Safran's engine achievements highlight their industry leadership and innovation across commercial and military aerospace applications.

== International Alliance ==
=== CFM International ===
CFM International is a 50/50 joint venture between GE Aircraft Engines and Safran Aircraft Engines of France. They have created the very successful CFM56 series, used on Boeing 737, Airbus A340, and Airbus A320 family aircraft.

=== International Aero Engines ===
International Aero Engines is a Zürich-registered joint venture between Pratt & Whitney, MTU Aero Engines and Japanese Aero Engine Corporation. The collaboration produced the V2500, the second most successful commercial jet engine program in production today in terms of volume, and the third most successful commercial jet engine program in aviation history.

=== GE Honda Aero Engines ===
GE Honda Aero Engines is a 50/50 joint venture between General Electric and Honda Aero, Inc. (HAI) formed in 2004, for the small size business jet market. They currently have one engine, the GE Honda HF120, used on the Honda Aircraft Company's HA-420 HondaJet

=== EuroJet ===
EuroJet Turbo GmbH is a multi-national consortium, the partner companies of which are Rolls-Royce of the United Kingdom, Avio of Italy, ITP of Spain and MTU Aero Engines of Germany. Eurojet GmbH was formed in 1986 to manage the development, production, support, maintenance, support and sales of the EJ200 turbofan engine for the Eurofighter Typhoon.

=== PowerJet ===
PowerJet is a 50/50 joint venture between Snecma (Safran) and NPO Saturn, created in July 2004. The company manufactures SaM146, the sole powerplant for the Sukhoi Superjet 100. In late March 2022, following international sanctions against Russia over the 2022 Russian invasion of Ukraine, PowerJet terminated its contract to provide parts, technical support, engine maintenance, or repair services with regard to the SaM146.

== Russia ==
=== NPO Saturn ===
NPO Saturn is a Russian aircraft engine manufacturer, formed from the mergers of Rybinsk and Lyul'ka-Saturn. Saturn's engines include Lyulka AL-31, Lyulka AL-41, NPO Saturn AL-55 and power many former Eastern Bloc aircraft, such as the Tupolev Tu-154. Saturn holds a 50% stake in the PowerJet joint venture with Snecma.

=== Aviadvigatel ===
Aviadvigatel is a Russian manufacturer of aircraft engines that succeeded the Soviet Soloviev Design Bureau. The company currently offers several versions of the Aviadvigatel PS-90 engine that powers Ilyushin Il-96-300/400/400T, Tupolev Tu-204, Tu-214 series and the Ilyushin Il-76-MD-90. The company is also developing the new Aviadvigatel PD-14 engine for the new Russian MS-21 airliner.

=== Klimov ===
Klimov was formed in the early 1930s to produce and improve upon the liquid-cooled Hispano-Suiza 12Y V-12 piston engine for which the USSR had acquired a license. Currently, Klimov is the manufacturer of the Klimov RD-33 turbofan engines.

== Ukraine ==
=== Ivchenko-Progress ===
Ivchenko-Progress is the Ukrainian aircraft engine company that succeeded the Soviet Ivchenko Design Bureau. Some of their engine models include Progress D-436 available on the Antonov An-72/74, Yakovlev Yak-42, Beriev Be-200, Antonov An-148 and Tupolev Tu-334 and Progress D-18T that powers two of the world's largest airplanes, Antonov An-124 and Antonov An-225.

=== Motor Sich ===
Motor-Sich currently produces the Ivchenko Progress D-18 turbofan which powers variants of the Antonov An-124 and An-225 freighters, although the Ivchenko Progress D-36/Ivchenko Progress D-436 series remain the highest production-rate engines in the CIS.

Motor Sich inherited some of the former Soviet Union's aero engine manufacturing capabilities. It produces turbofan, turboprop and rotary-wing turboshaft engines that power aircraft in Russian service, such as Mi- and Ka-series military helicopters.

== Japan ==
=== Ishikawajima-Harima Heavy Industries ===
Ishikawajima-Harima Heavy Industries is the Japan aircraft engine company. The company manufactures the F3 for Kawasaki T-4, the XF5-1 for ATD-X, and the F7 for Kawasaki P-1.

== India ==
=== Gas Turbine Research Establishment (GTRE) ===
The Gas Turbine Research Establishment, part of the Indian government's DRDO, was established in 1959 to design, develop and integrate advance technologies, state of art aero gas turbine engines and their derivatives for defence forces. It developed the India's "first centrifugal type 10 kN thrust engine" between 1959–61 and has produced the GTX 37-14U and GTRE GTX-35VS Kaveri turbofan engines amongst others. The GTRE GTX-35VS Kaveri was intended to power the HAL Tejas and the HAL AMCA being built by the Aeronautical Development Agency.

== China ==
Three Chinese corporations build turbofan engines. Some of these are licensed or reverse engineered versions of European and Russian turbofans, and the other are indigenous models. Shenyang Aircraft Corporation (manufacturer of Shenyang WS-10), Xi'an Aero-Engine Corporation (manufacturer of Xian WS-15) and Guizhou Aircraft Industry Corporation (manufacturer of Guizhou WS-13) manufacture turbofans.

== North Korea ==
Kumsong-3 is North Korean domestic variant/clone of Kh-35 that was utilized R95TP-300/MS-400 turbofan engine while improved model has comparable range to Kh-35U that is utilizing TRDD-50 turbofan engine.

North Korea tested land attack cruise missile that demonstrated 1500 kilometer range and touted development of new turbofan engine.

== Iran ==
Iranian made Jahesh-700 light turbofan engine is similar to Williams FJ33 or Williams FJ44. Also there is Soumar cruise missile's mini turbofan.

== Turkiye ==
Tusaş Engine Industries (TEI) developed and manufactured Türkiye's first indigenous turbofan TEI-TF6000, with 6,000 lbf dry thrust. An afterburner version, TF-10000, is under development to provide 10,000 lbf thrust intended to be used on the Kizilelma UCAV.

== Gallery ==
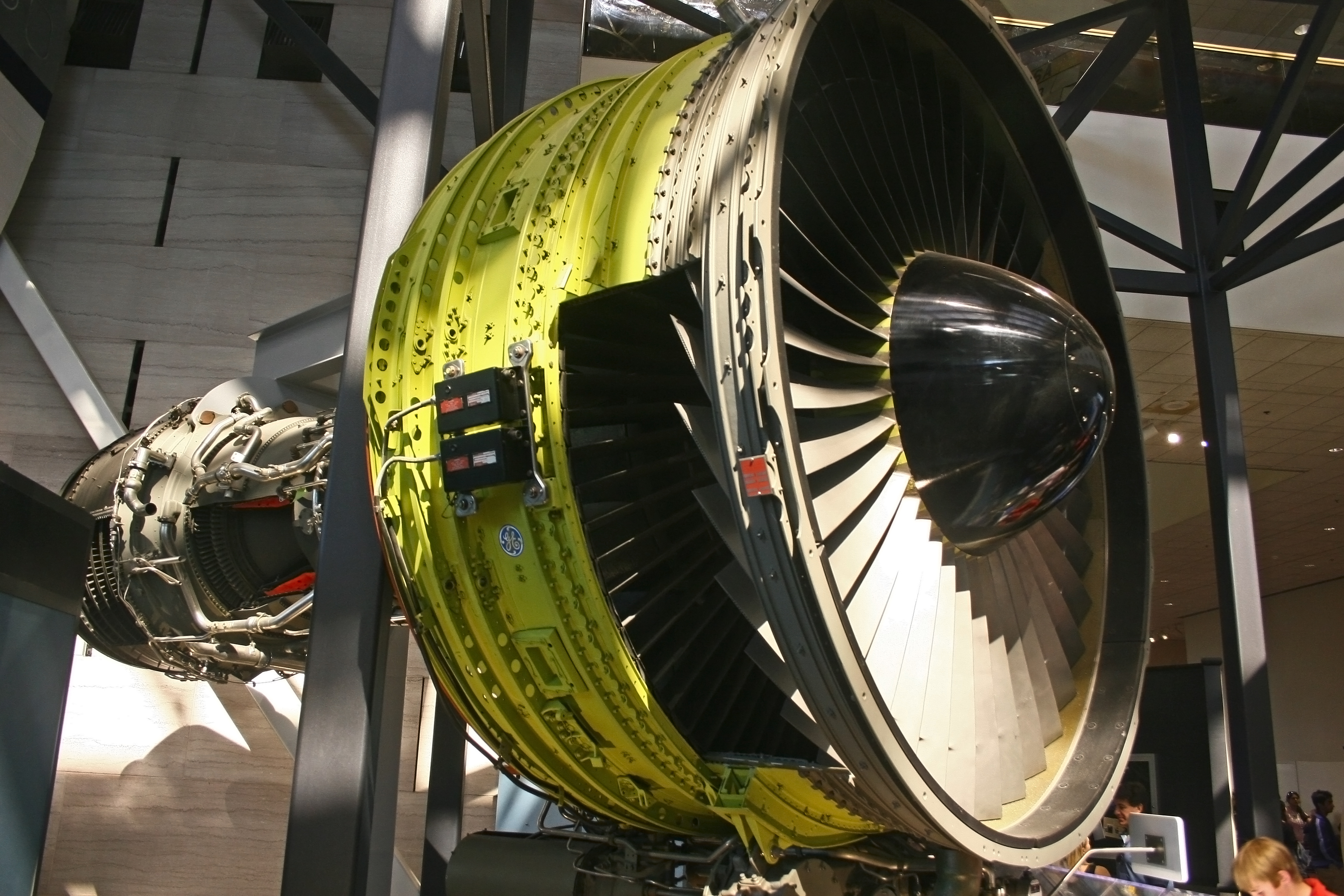
General Electric CF6 which powers the Airbus A300, Boeing 747, Douglas DC-10 and other aircraft

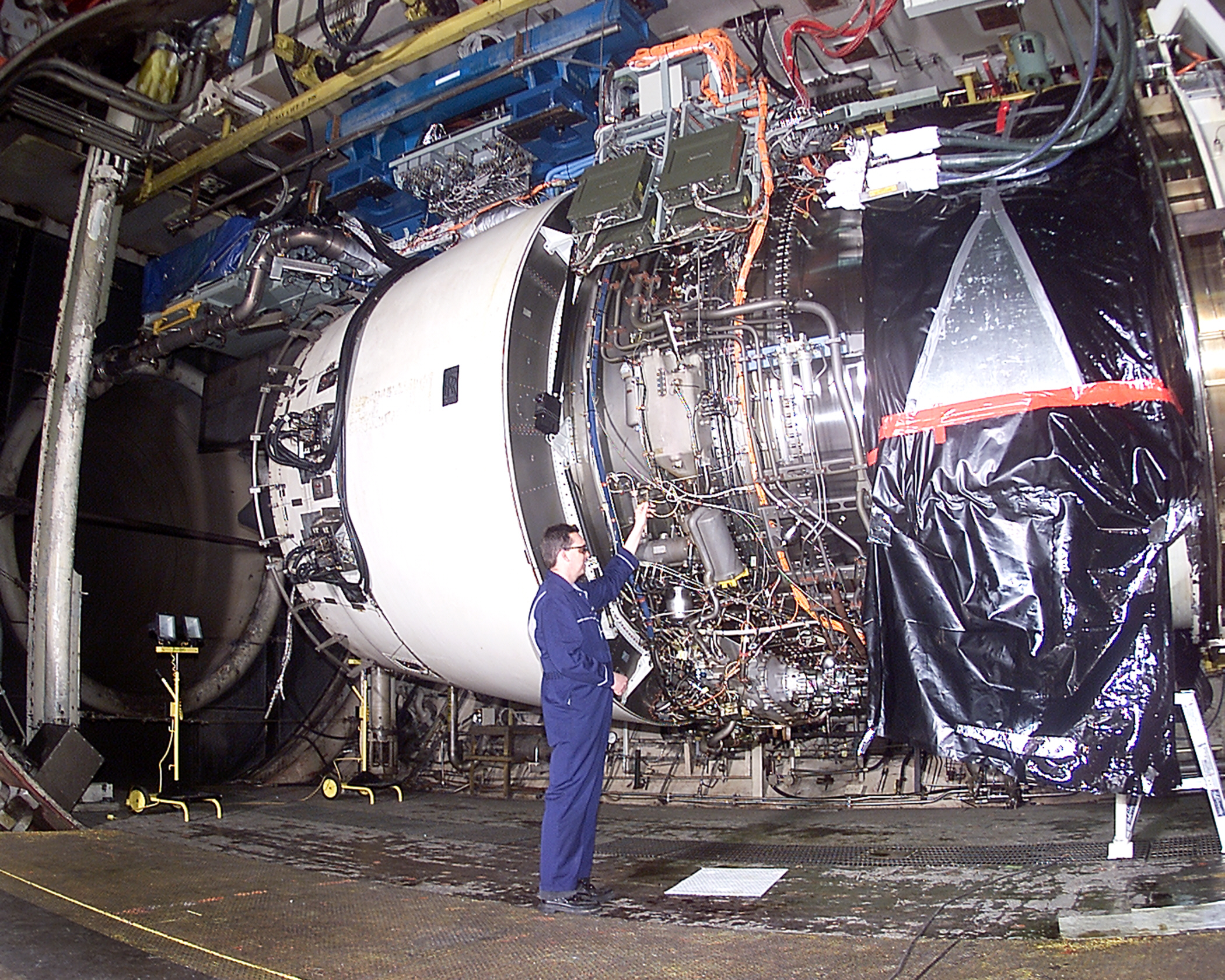
Rolls-Royce Trent 900 undergoing climatic testing

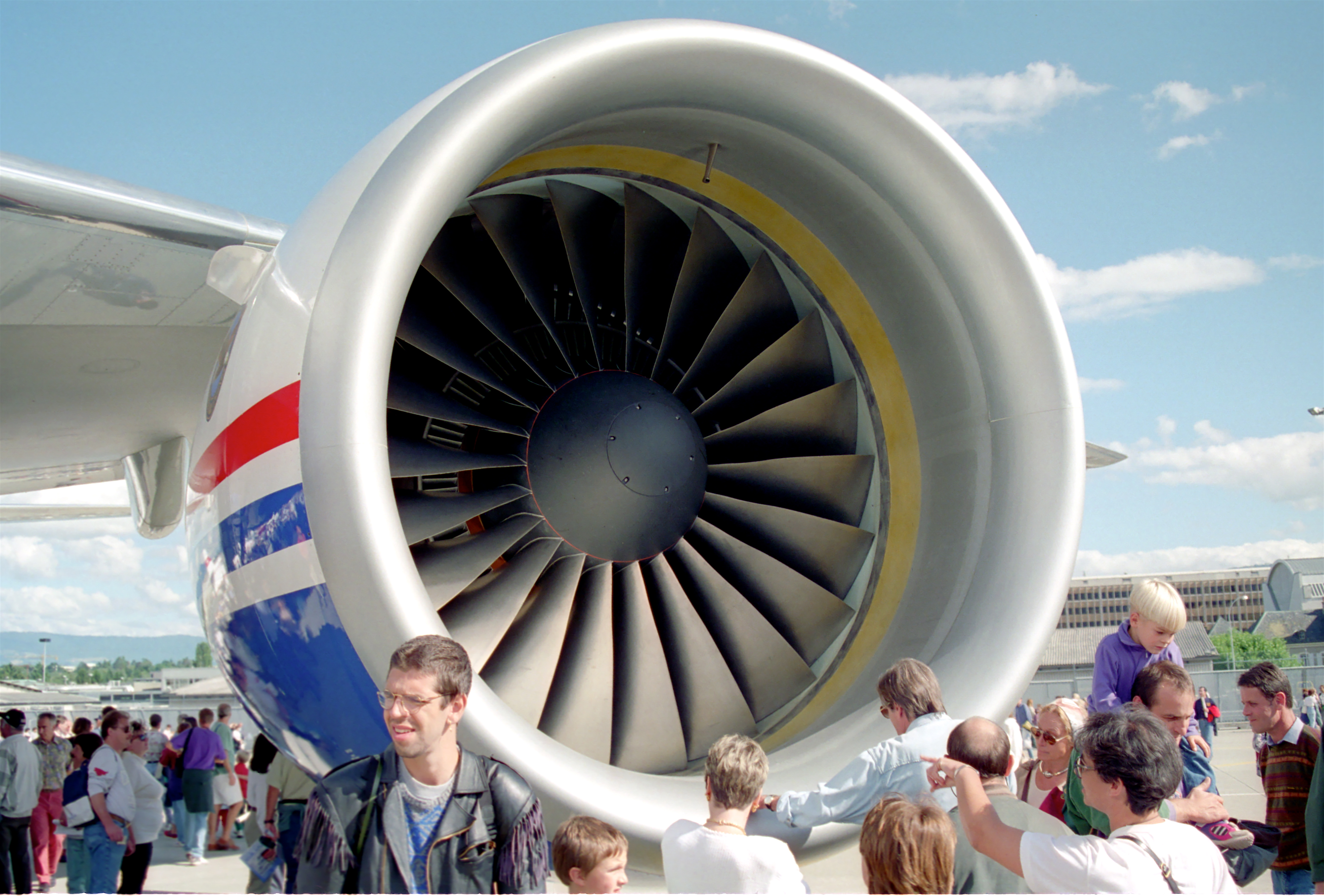
Pratt & Whitney PW4000 which powered the first Boeing 777

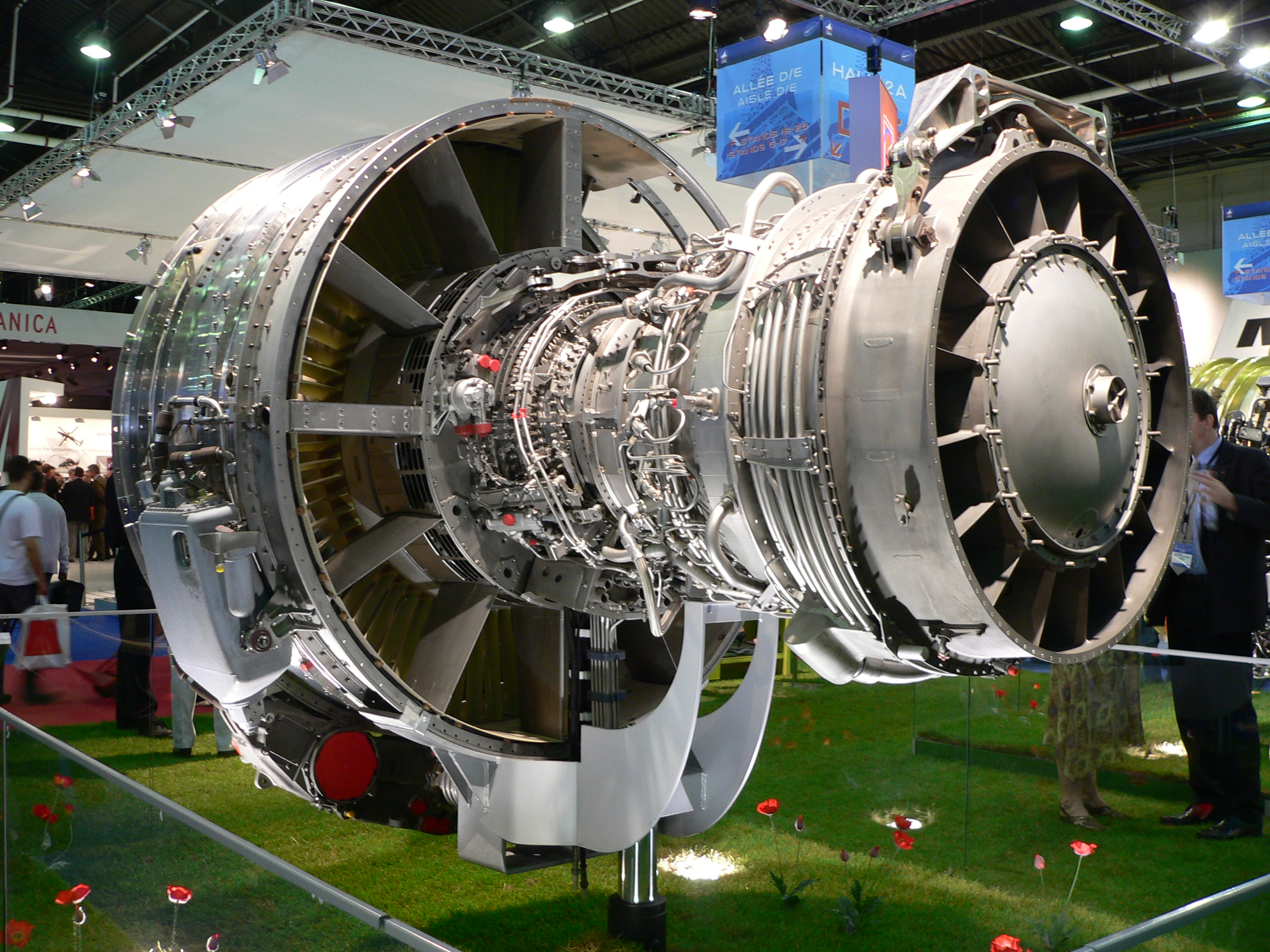
The CFM56 which powers the Boeing 737, the Airbus A320 and other aircraft

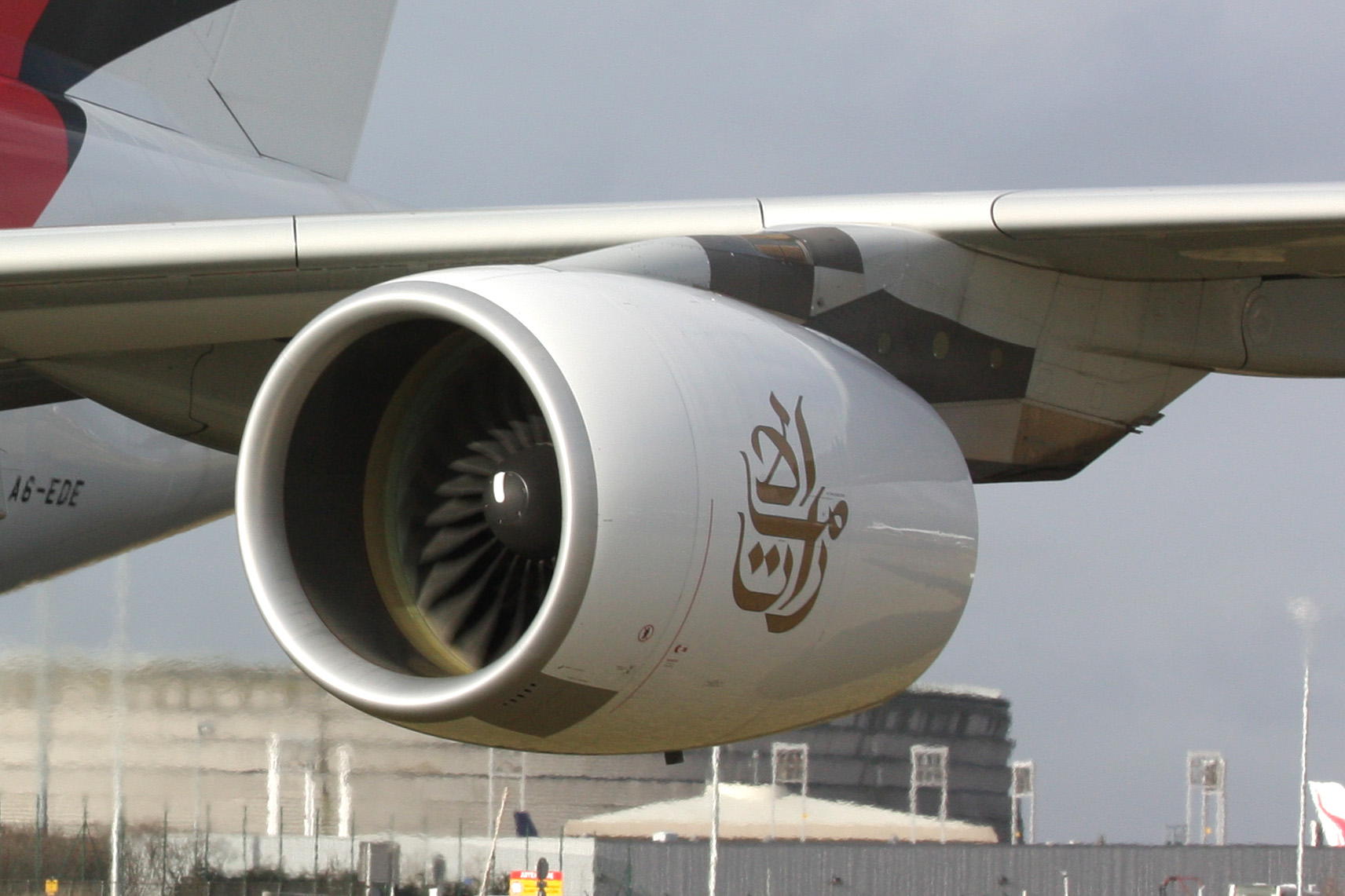
Engine Alliance GP7000 turbofan for the Airbus A380

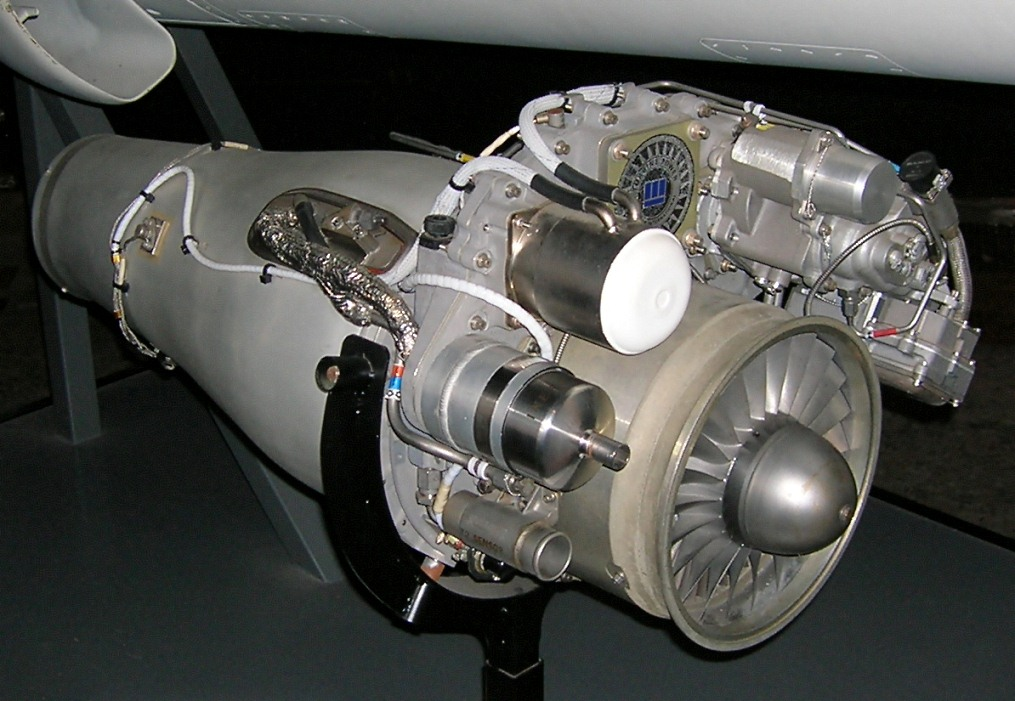
Williams F107 which powers the Raytheon BGM-109 Tomahawk cruise missile

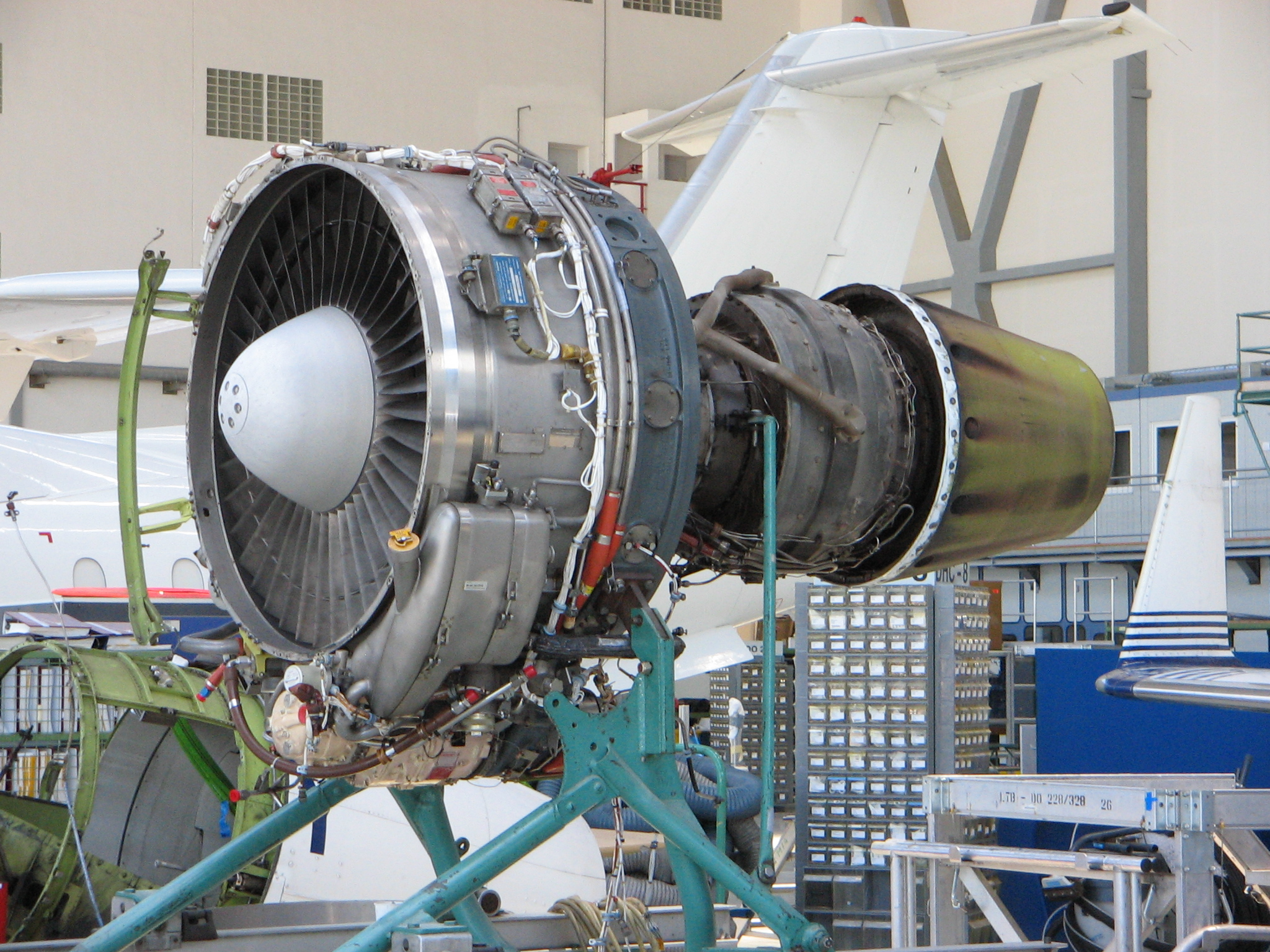
Honeywell Aerospace Lycoming ALF 502 which powers the British Aerospace 146

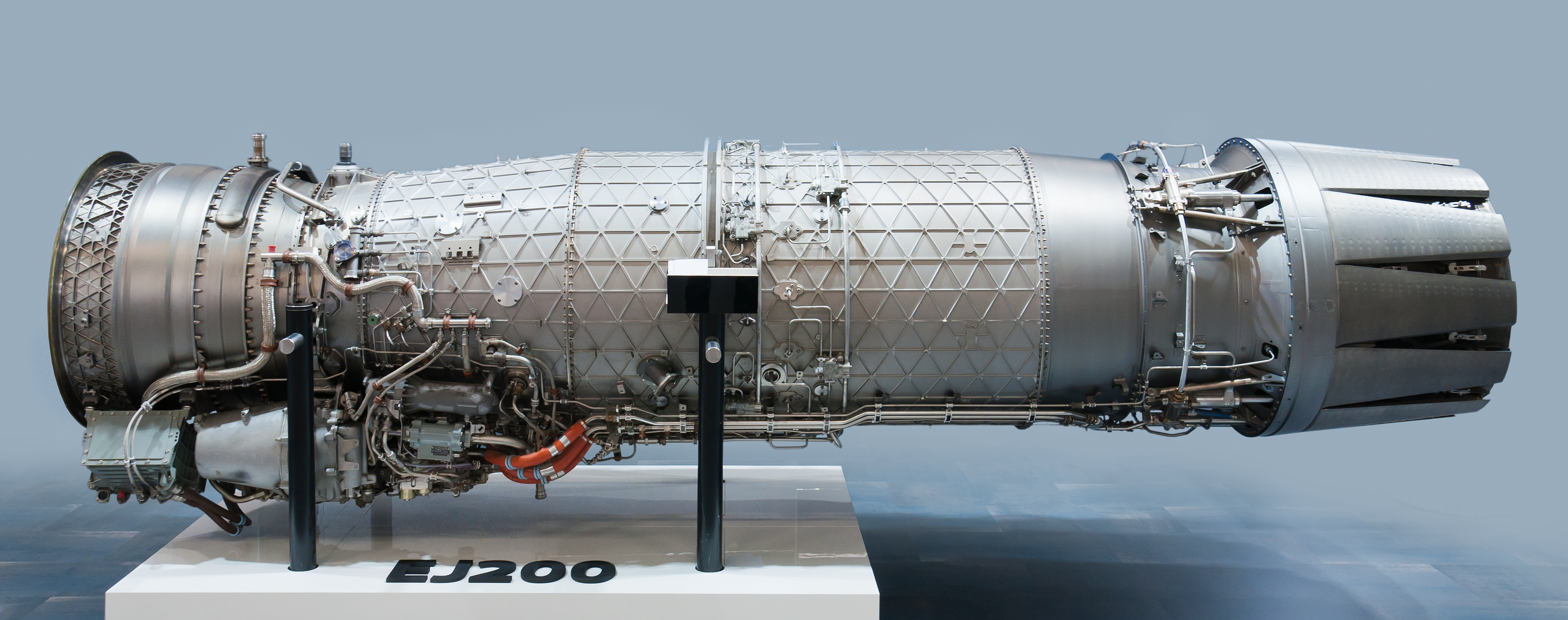
Eurojet EJ200 which powers the Eurofighter Typhoon

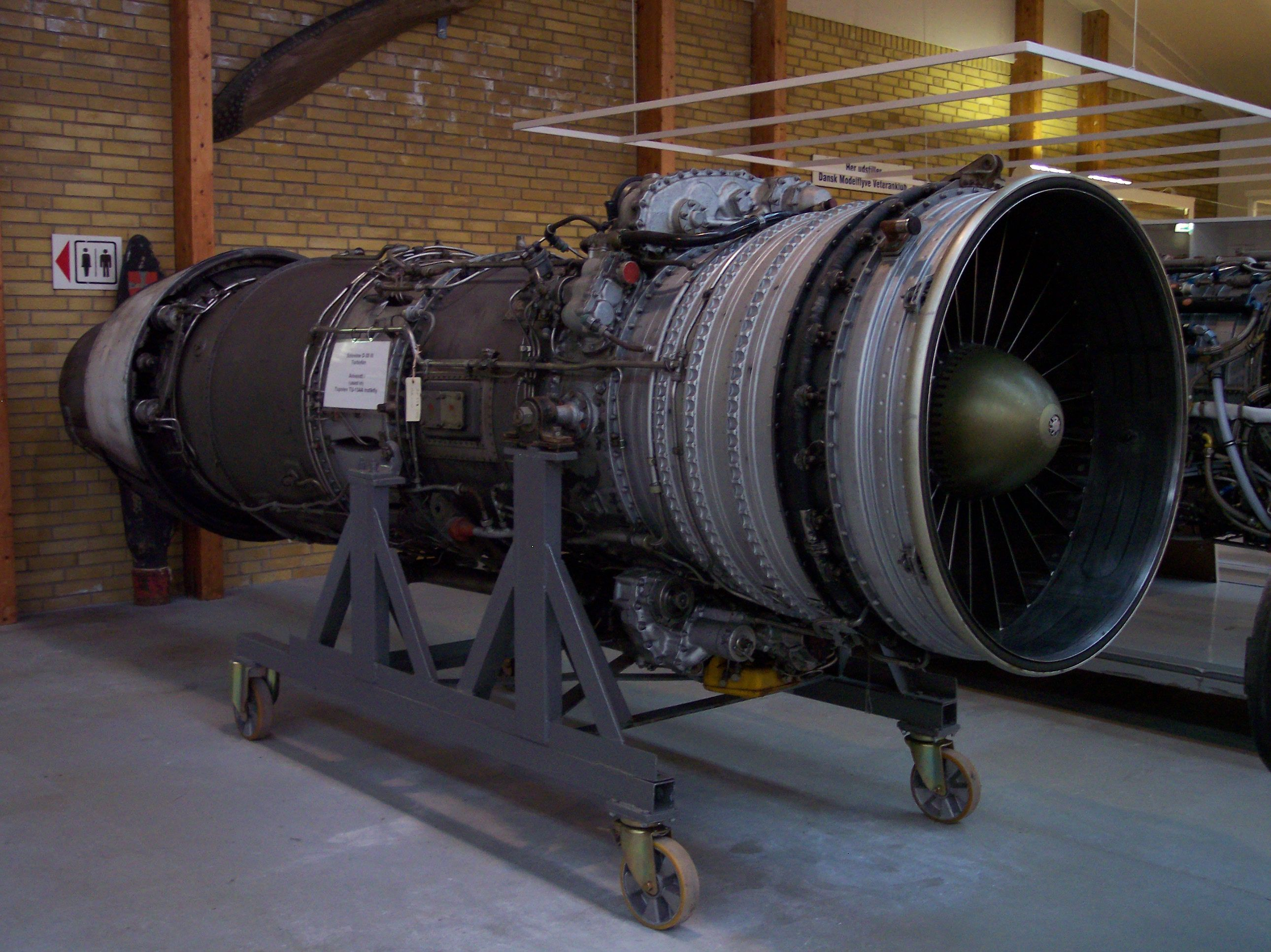
Soloviev D-30 which powers the Mikoyan MiG-31, Ilyushin Il-76, Ilyushin Il-62M, Xian H-6K, Xian Y-20 and Tupolev Tu-154

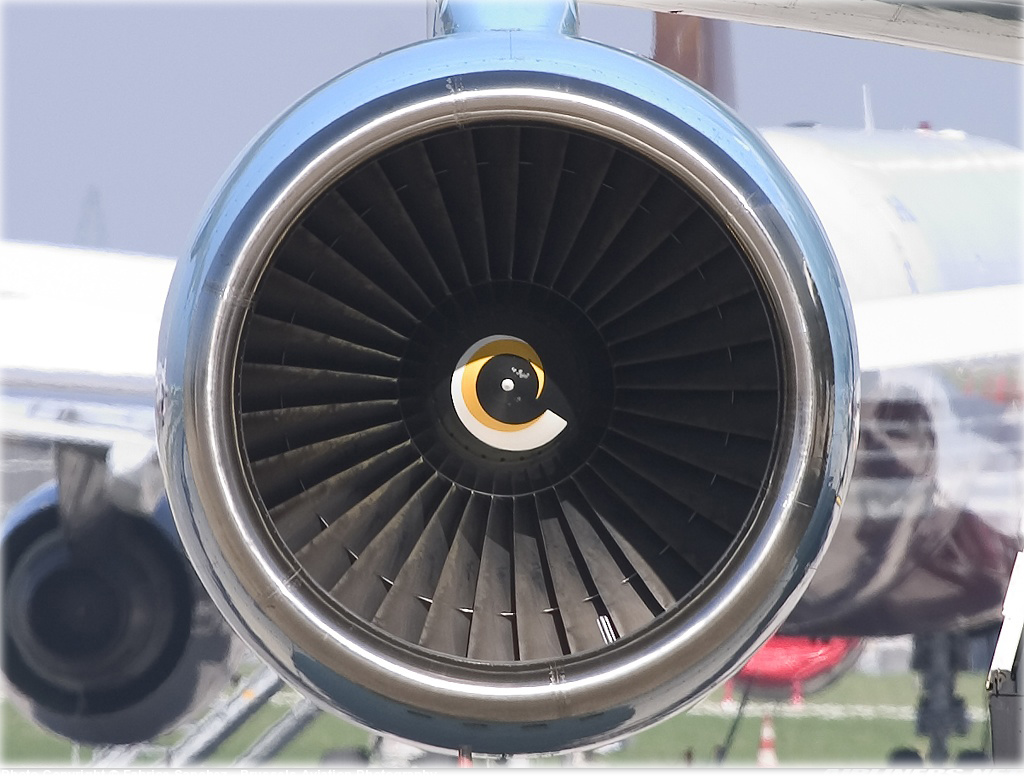
Aviadvigatel PS-90 which powers the Ilyushin Il-96, Tupolev Tu-204, Ilyushin Il-76

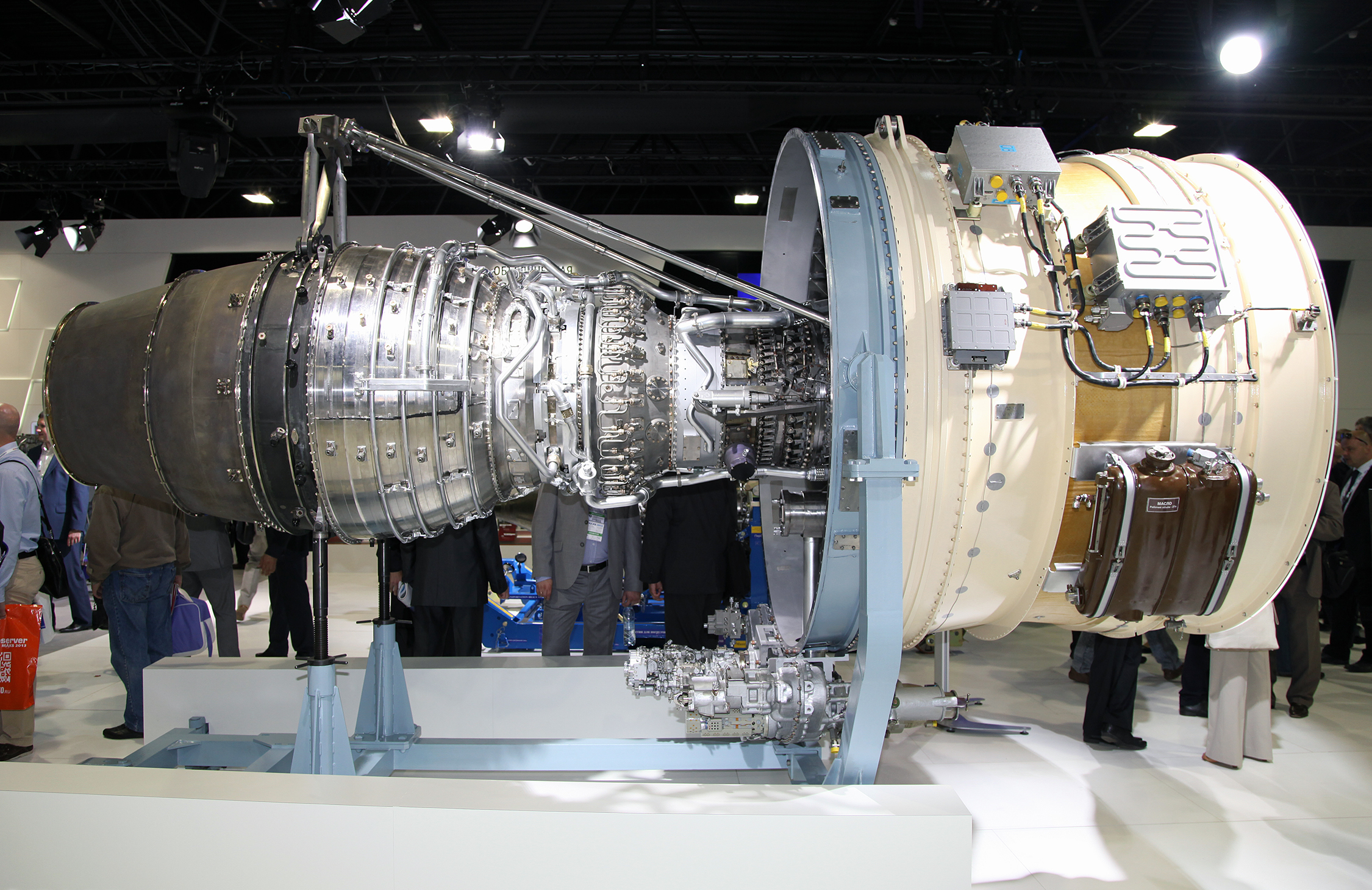
Aviadvigatel PD-14 which will be used on the Irkut MC-21

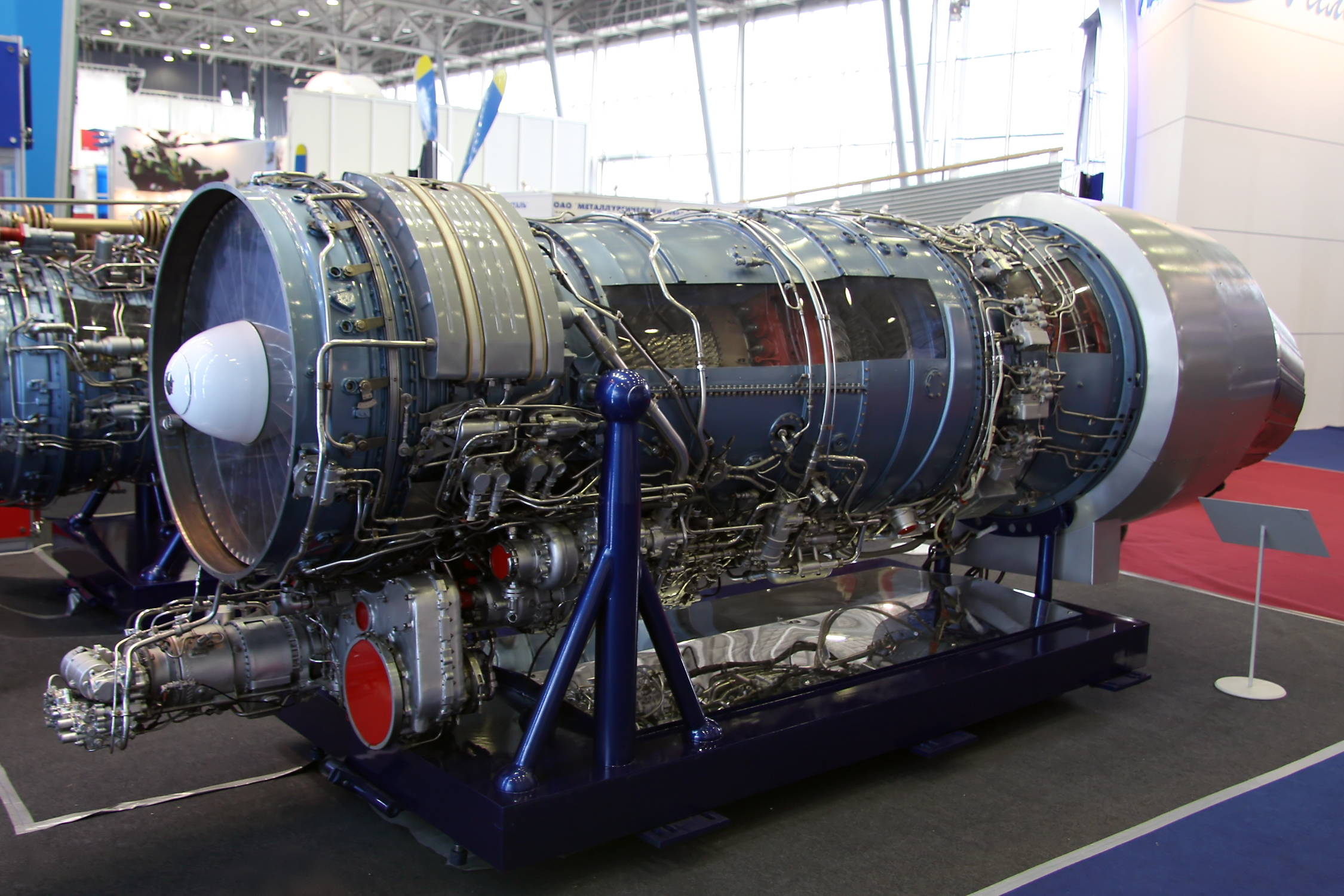
Saturn AL-31 which powers the Sukhoi Su-30, Sukhoi Su-27, Chengdu J-10, Shenyang J-11

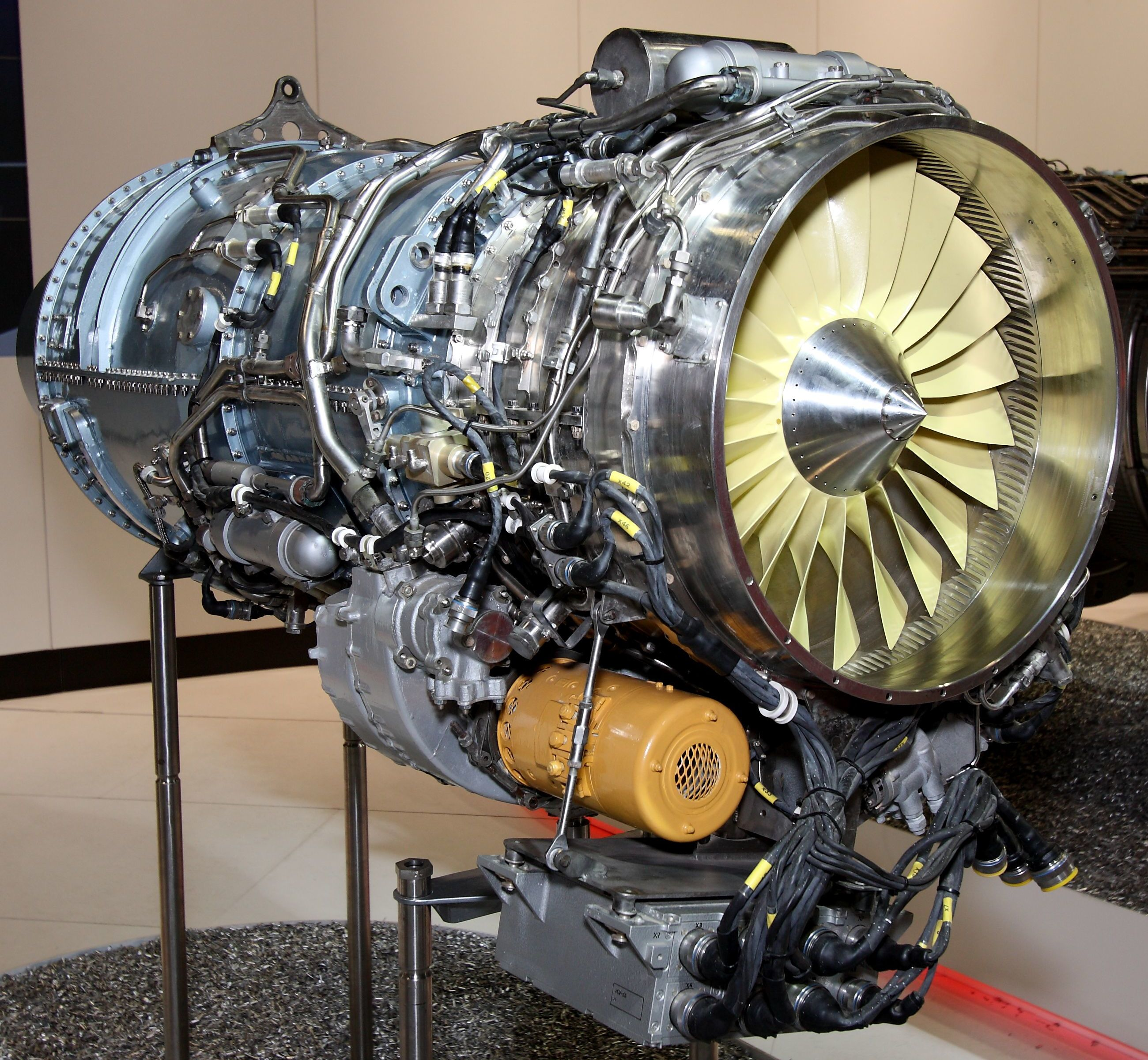
NPO Saturn AL-55 which powers certain HAL HJT-36 Sitara

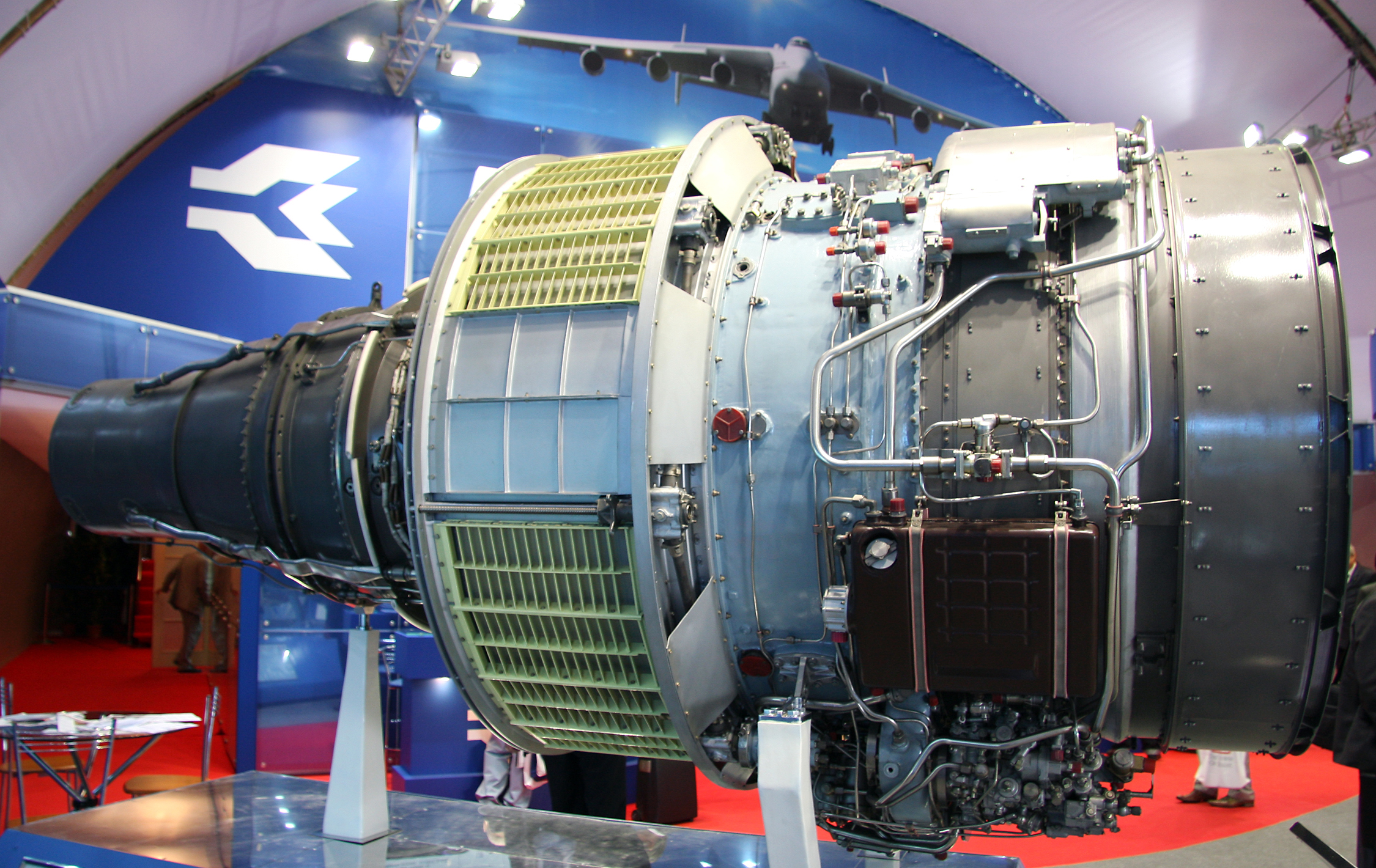
Ivchenko-Progress D-436 sharing the three shaft principle with Rolls-Royce Trent

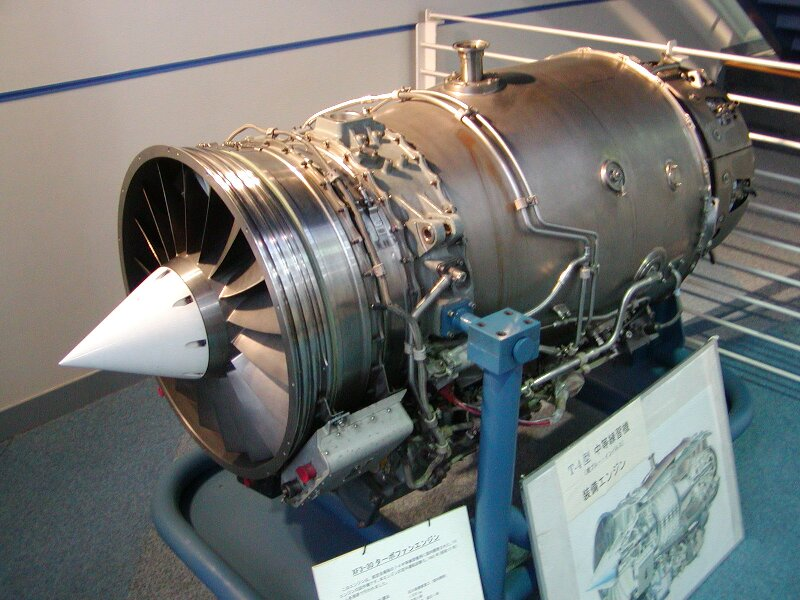
Ishikawajima-Harima F3 which powers the Kawasaki T-4

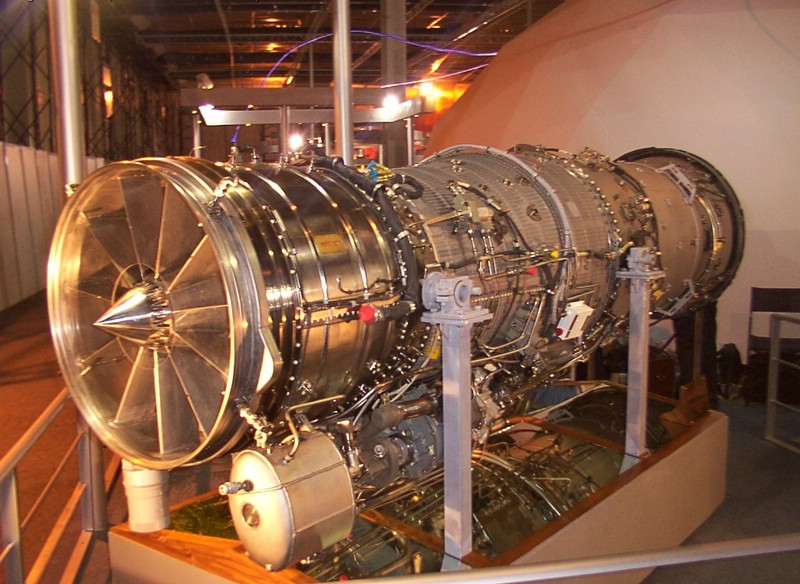
GTRE GTX-35VS Kaveri developed by GTRE for HAL Tejas

== Commercial turbofans in production ==
Commercial turbofans in production
| Model | Start | Bypass | Length | Fan | Weight | Thrust | Thrust/Weight ratio | Major applications |
|---|---|---|---|---|---|---|---|---|
| GE CF6 | 1971 | 4.3–5.3 | 4.00–4.41 m | 2.20–2.79 m | 3.82–5.08 t | 222–298 kN | 4.45–7.94 | A300/A310, A330, B747, B767, MD-11, DC-10 |
| GE CF34 | 1982 | 5.3–6.3 | 2.62–3.26 m | 1.25–1.32 m | 0.74–1.12 t | 41–82.3 kN | 3.74–11.34 | Challenger 600, CRJ, E-jets |
| GE GE90 | 1992 | 8.7–9.9 | 5.18–5.40 m | 3.12–3.25 m | 7.56–8.62 t | 330–510 kN | 3.95–6.84 | B777 |
| GE GEnx | 2006 | 8.0–9.3 | 4.31–4.69 m | 2.66–2.82 m | 5.62–5.82 t | 296–339 kN | 5.19–6.16 | B747-8, B787 |
| GE Passport | 2013 | 5.6 | 3.37 m | 1.30 m | 2.07 t | 78.9–84.2 kN | 3.86–4.13 | Global 7000/8000 |
| GE Honda HF120 | 2009 | 2.9 | 1.51 m | 0.66 m | 0.211 t | 9.1 kN | 4.41 | HA-420 |
| GE-H HF120 | 2009 | 4.43 | 1.12 m | 0.54 m | 0.18 t | 7.4 kN | 4.20 | HondaJet |
| P&W PW4000 | 1984 | 4.8–6.4 | 3.37–4.95 m | 2.84 m | 4.18–7.48 t | 222–436 kN | 3.04–10.60 | A300/A310, A330, B747, B767, B777, MD-11 |
| P&W PW6000 | 2000 | 4.90 | 2.73 m | 1.44 m | 2.36 t | 100.2 kN | 4.32 | Airbus A318 |
| P&W PW1000G | 2008 | 9.0–12.5 | 3.40 m | 1.42–2.06 m | 2.86 t | 67–160 kN | 2.38–5.70 | A320neo, CSeries, E-Jets E2 |
| P&WC PW300 | 1988 | 3.8–4.5 | 1.92–2.07 m | 0.97 m | 0.45–0.47 t | 23.4–35.6 kN | 5.05–8.09 | Cit. Sovereign, G200, F. 7X, F. 2000 |
| P&WC PW500 | 1993 | 3.90 | 1.52 m | 0.70 m | 0.28 t | 13.3 kN | 4.85 | Citation Excel, Phenom 300 |
| P&WC PW600 | 2001 | 1.8–2.8 | 0.67 m | 0.36 m | 0.15 t | 6.0 kN | 4.08 | Cit. Mustang, Eclipse 500, Phenom 100 |
| P&WC PW800 | 2012 | 5.5 | 1.30 m | 1.30 m | 1.4 t | 67.4–69.7 kN | 4.91-5.07 | Gulfstream G500/G600, Falcon 6X |
| R-R BR700 | 1994 | 4.2–4.5 | 3.41–3.60 m | 1.32–1.58 m | 1.63–2.11 t | 68.9–102.3 kN | 3.31–6.40 | B717, Global Express, Gulfstream V |
| R-R Trent 500 | 1999 | 8.5 | 3.91 m | 2.47 m | 4.72 t | 252 kN | 5.44 | A340-500/600 |
| R-R Trent 700 | 1990 | 4.9 | 3.91 m | 2.47 m | 4.79 t | 320 kN | 6.83 | A330 |
| R-R Trent 800 | 1993 | 5.7–5.79 | 4.37 m | 2.79 m | 5.96–5.98 t | 411–425 kN | 7.02–7.27 | B777 |
| R-R Trent 900 | 2004 | 8.7 | 4.55 m | 2.95 m | 6.18–6.25 t | 340–357 kN | 5.56–5.87 | A380 |
| R-R Trent 1000 | 2006 | 10.8–11 | 4.74 m | 2.85 m | 5.77 t | 265.3–360.4 kN | 4.69–6.36 | B787 |
| R-R Trent XWB | 2010 | 9.3 | 5.22 m | 3.00 m | 7.28 t | 330–430 kN | 4.63–6.02 | A350XWB |
| R-R Tay | 1984 | 3.1–3.2 | 2.41 m | 1.12–1.14 m | 1.42–1.53 t | 61.6–68.5 kN | 4.13–4.92 | Gulfstream IV, Fokker 70/100 |
| R-R AE 3007 | 1991 | 5.0 | 2.71 m | 1.11 m | 0.72 t | 33.7 kN | 4.77 | ERJ, Citation X |
| CFM56 | 1974 | 5.0–6.6 | 2.36–2.52 m | 1.52–1.84 m | 1.95–2.64 t | 97.9–151 kN | 3.82–7.91 | A320, A340-200/300, B737, KC-135, DC-8 |
| CFM LEAP | 2013 | 9.0–11.0 | 3.15–3.33 m | 1.76–1.98 m | 2.78–3.15 t | 100–146 kN | 3.26–5.33 | A320neo, B737 Max, Comac C919 |
| IAE V2500 | 1987 | 4.4–4.9 | 3.20 m | 1.60 m | 2.36–2.54 t | 97.9–147 kN | 4.32 | A320, MD-90 |
| EA GP7000 | 2004 | 8.7 | 4.75 m | 2.95 m | 6.09–6.71 t | 311–363 kN | 4.70–6.07 | A380 |
| HW TFE731 | 1970 | 2.66–3.9 | 1.52–2.08 m | 0.72–0.78 m | 0.34–0.45 t | 15.6–22.2 kN | 3.61–6.65 | Learjet 70/75, G150, Falcon 900 |
| HW HTF7000 | 1999 | 4.4 | 2.29 m | 0.87 m | 0.62 t | 28.9 kN | 4.74 | Challenger 300, G280, Legacy 500 |
| Williams FJ44 | 1985 | 3.3–4.1 | 1.36–2.09 m | 0.53–0.57 m | 0.21–0.24 t | 6.7–15.6 kN | 3.21–7.60 | CitationJet, Cit. M2, HA-480 Echelon |
| Williams FJ33 | 1998 | — | 0.98 m | 0.53 m | 0.14 t | 6.7 kN | 4.88 | Cirrus SF50 |
| Silvercrest | 2012 | 5.9 | 1.90 m | 1.08 m | 1.09 t | 50.9 kN | 4.76 | Cit. Hemisphere, Falcon 5X |
| PS-90 | 1992 | 4.4 | 4.96 m | 1.9 m | 2.95 t | 157–171 kN | 5.42–5.89 | Ilyushin Il-76, Ilyushin Il-96, Tupolev Tu-204 |
| PowerJet SaM146 | 2008 | 4–4.1 | 3.59 m | 1.22 m | 2.26 t | 71.6–79.2 kN | 3.23–3.57 | Sukhoi Superjet 100 |
