= Alkenone =

Class of chemical compounds

Alkenones are long-chain unsaturated methyl and ethyl n-ketones produced by a few phytoplankton species of the class Prymnesiophyceae. Alkenones typically contain between 35 and 41 carbon atoms and with between two and four double bonds. Uniquely for biolipids, alkenones have a spacing of five methylene groups between double bonds, which are of the less common E configuration. The biological function of alkenones remains under debate although it is likely that they are storage lipids. Alkenones were first described in ocean sediments recovered from Walvis Ridge and then shortly afterwards in cultures of the marine coccolithophore Gephyrocapsa huxleyi. The earliest known occurrence of alkenones is during the Aptian 120 million years ago. They are used in organic geochemistry as a proxy for past sea surface temperature.

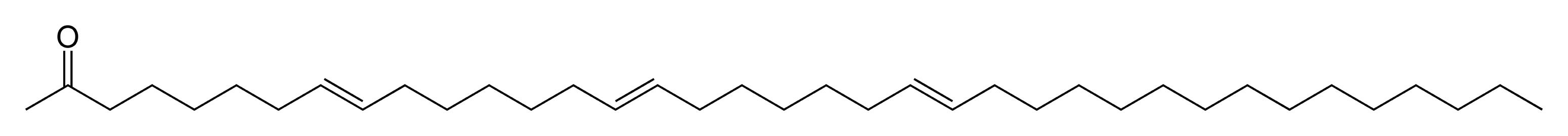
The chemical structure of a 37:3 alkenone, (8E,15E,22E)-heptatriaconta-8,15,22-trien-2-one, C_{37}H_{68}O

Alkenone-producing species respond to changes in their environment — including to changes in water temperature — by altering the relative proportions of the different alkenones they produce. At higher temperatures more saturated alkenones are produced proportionally. This means that the relative degree of unsaturation of alkenones can be used to estimate the temperature of the water in which the alkenone-producing organisms grew. The relative degree of unsaturation as first described (U^{K}_{37}) included the tetra unsaturated C_{37} alkenone:

U^{K}_{37} = (C_{37:2} - C_{37:4})/(C_{37:2} + C_{37:3} + C_{37:4})

However, a simplified Unsaturation Index (U^{K′}_{37}), generally more useful in marine settings, is based on di- versus tri- unsaturated C_{37} alkenones and defined as:

U^{K′}_{37} = C_{37:2}/(C_{37:2} + C_{37:3})

The U^{K′}_{37} can then be used to estimate sea surface temperature according to an empirical relationship determined from core-top calibrations. The most commonly used calibration is that of Müller et al., 1998:

U^{K′}_{37} = 0.033T [°C] + 0.044

The Müller et al. (1998) calibration is not suitable for all environments and, in particular, different calibrations are required for high latitudes and lacustrine settings.
