= Sustainable Oils =

- Industry: Biofuels, Energy, Oils, Oleochemicals, Aviation biofuel
- Founded: 2005; 21 years ago
- Headquarters: Great Falls, Montana
- Website: www.susoils.com

Sustainable Oils is a renewable fuels company specializing in the research and production of Camelina, the only advanced biofuels' feedstock with United States Department of Agriculture, Environmental Protection Agency, and Food and Drug Administration (FDA) regulatory approvals. Oil extracted from Camelina seeds can be processed into a number of renewable products including renewable jet fuel, green diesel, biodiesel, green plastics and renewable oleochemicals. The biomass that remains after oil extraction, generally referred to seedcake or meal, can be used as nutrient-rich animal feed. Camelina offers several advantages over traditional biofuel feedstocks like soy and corn, such as competitive oil yields and shorter growing seasons. Sustainable Oils has its primary operations in the state of Montana and is headquartered in Great Falls.

== History ==
The Sustainable Oils research program began in 2005. In 2007, Targeted Growth, Inc. and Green Earth Fuels established Sustainable Oils as a Limited Liability Company in the state of Delaware.

In 2008, the company was awarded a contract by the United States Department of Defense to supply the US Navy 40,000 gallons of Camelina-based jet fuel for certification testing of alternative fuels.

In early 2009, Sustainable Oils began field research operations in Chile.

In March 2011, a F-22 Raptor fighter jet completed a successful test flight running on a 50% blend of Camelina fuel and traditional jet fuel. Sustainable Oils supplied all the Camelina oil for the test.

In March 2013, Global Clean Energy Holdings, a Torrance, California-based biofuel feedstock company, acquired Sustainable Oils.

In October 2021, Global Clean Energy Holdings announced the relocation of the Sustainable Oils headquarters to Great Falls, Montana.

In November 2021, Sustainable Oils announced the purchase of 45 acres in Havre, Montana and a plan to construct a 600 thousand bushel storage and rail loading facility for its proprietary camelina grain.

In November 2023, Sustainable Oils announced the advancement of camelina varieties with herbicide resistance. The company also reported 20 patented varieties of camelina and 65,000 acres of camelina growing worldwide.

== Research ==
Sustainable Oils has one of the largest Camelina research programs in the world, which began in 2005. It has conducted over 140 field trials across 34 states in the continental US and six provinces of Canada. The company has established research nurseries in Montana, Arizona, and Chile.

Global Clean Energy, Sustainable Oils' parent company, owns 20 proprietary and patented varieties of camelina that purport to have higher grain and oil yield and more beneficial agronomic characteristics than other strains.

== Supply of Camelina Oil to U.S. military ==
In 2008, Sustainable Oils and Honeywell signed a contract to supply the United States Defense Logistics Agency, the purchasing agency within the Department of Defense, with 40,000 gallons of Camelina-based renewable jet fuel for test flights in jets and helicopters. Using a blend of 50% Camelina fuel and 50% traditional jet fuel, the Navy conducted performance trials in the F/A-18 Super Hornet, F-22 Raptor, and an SH-60 Seahawk Helicopter. All tests were conclusively successful, and each aircraft was able to perform above military standards. For example, the F-22 Raptor was able to perform a 40,000-foot supercruise and achieve speeds in excess of 1.5 Mach.

Over the course of the entire testing program, Sustainable Oils supplied the military with nearly 500,000 gallons of Camelina oil.

== EPA approval of Camelina ==
In February 2013, Camelina received approval from the United States Environmental Protection Agency, qualifying its oil as an advanced biofuel feedstock or pathway under the Renewable Fuel Standard. Sustainable Oils was one of multiple organizations that participated in the conversation surrounding the approval process. Under the standard, every gallon of Camelina oil-based biofuel produced in the U.S. by qualified producers receives a unique Renewable Identification Number, or RIN, certifying it as a Federally approved advanced biofuel. Only fuels produced from approved pathways can be used to meet the EPA mandated minimums for advanced biofuels blending under the Renewable Fuel Standard.

== Acquisition ==
On March 14, 2013, Global Clean Energy Holdings acquired Sustainable Oils from its parent company Targeted Growth Inc. in exchange for common stock in Global Clean Energy Holdings and a promissory note.
