= Global Clean Energy Holdings =

American renewable energy company

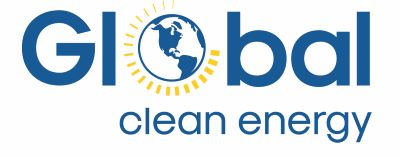
- Industry: Biofuels, Energy, Oils, Oleochemicals, Aviation biofuel
- Founded: 2007
- Headquarters: Torrance, California
- Key people: Richard Palmer (CEO)
- Website: http://www.gceholdings.com

Global Clean Energy Holdings (OTC:GCEH) is a Southern California-based renewable energy company with interests in the production and commercialization of non-food-based feedstocks used for the production of biofuels, biomass, and renewable chemicals. It was founded in 2007.

== History ==
In 2008, GCEH purchased approximately 5,000 acres of farmland in Mexico’s Yucatan Peninsula. The farm is a joint venture with Stewart A. Resnick and Selim Zilkha, two entrepreneurs with agricultural & alternative energy companies.

On April 1, Interjet completed the first Jatropha-based biofuel test flight in Mexico. The fuel was manufactured by Honeywell’s UOP LLC from oil produced by three Mexican Jatropha producers including Globales Energia Renovables, a wholly owned subsidiary of Global Clean Energy Holdings.

In mid-2011, GCEH, Emerald Biofuels, and Honeywell's UOP LLC submitted a joint Renewable Fuel Standard pathway application to the U.S. EPA for Jatropha. A pathway is necessary for Jatropha-based renewable fuels to qualify for generating Renewable Identification Numbers (RINS) under the Energy Policy Act of 2005.

Two weeks after the U.S. EPA approved Camelina for RIN (Renewable Identification Number) generation under RFS2, Global Clean Energy announced its purchase of Sustainable Oils, LLC, in Camelina production and genetics. Completed on February 13, 2013, the acquisition was trumpeted by Honeywell's UOP LLC, Boeing, and other public and private bio-energy stakeholders.

In February 2015, Sustainable Oils camelina varieties were issued a first-of-its-kind feedstock-only pathway by the California Air Resources Board for the production of Camelina-based fuels under the Low Carbon Fuel Standard (LCFS). The pathway, when combined with a specific processors production profile, will produce the lowest carbon intensity (CI) virgin oil-based fuel available in the marketplace. Camelina-based biodiesel at a CI of approximately 19 g/MJ can be produced at a fraction of soy (83 g/MJ) or canola (63 g/MJ) based biofuels. Camelina's extremely low CI will allow obligated parties in California to meet their reduction targets using a fraction of the biofuel otherwise required. The pathway only applies to Sustainable Oils' US Patent and Trademark Office-registered seed varieties - no other Camelina seed or oil can be used to produce LCFS compliant fuel.

In May 2020, GCEH acquired the Bakersfield Refinery from Alon Bakersfield Properties, Inc., a subsidiary of Delek US Holdings, Inc. and the owner of the Alon Bakersfield Refinery. The Alon Bakersfield Refinery was an existing oil refinery located in Bakersfield, California. Historically, the refinery had produced diesel from crude oil. GCEH immediately commenced in retooling the refinery to produce renewable diesel from organic feedstocks such as vegetable oils. The facility, when repurposed as a renewable fuels refinery, will vertically integrate to produce renewable diesel from various feedstocks, including GCEH’s patented proprietary fallow land crop varieties of camelina.

In January 2022, GCEH purchased Camelina Company Espana, the largest camelina producer in Europe.

On April 16, 2025, Global Clean Energy Holdings filed for Chapter 11 bankruptcy protection, with plans to sell itself to lenders and CTCI Americas Inc., an engineering firm, as part of a plan to eliminate most of its $2 billion debt.

The company currently holds the world's largest patent and IP portfolio for Camelina sativa, a nonfood renewable fuel feedstock that grows on otherwise idle or fallow acres between main crop cycles.

== Roundtable on Sustainable Biomaterials Certification ==
In November 2012, GCEH became the first company based in North America and the only biodiesel feedstock producer to achieve Roundtable on Sustainable Biomaterials (RSB) certification.

Richard Palmer, CEO of GCEH, is a former member of the RSB Board of Directors.

== Center for Sustainable Energy Farming ==
In November 2010, GCEH formed the Center for Sustainable Energy Farming (CFSEF), a non-profit research institution dedicated to advancing the quality of plant-based feedstocks for biofuel production. It is fueled by socially responsible clean energy produced from Jatropha.

The Center‘s mission is to perform plant science research in genetics, breeding and horticulture, and further develop technologies to allow for the economic commercialization and sustainability of energy farms. The Center provides a common research platform to foster communication and cooperation among various national and international research institutions and organizations in the biofuel sector. From global economics, environmental and social perspective, this collaboration hope to contribute to the development of more productive energy farms capable of supplying large quantities of plant-based (non-food) oils to replace the use of fossil fuels. The goals of this initiative are to create jobs in the agri-business and alternative energy industries, expand the use of non-productive land, reduce global dependency on oil reserves, and contribute to the reduction of carbon emissions.

The Center is focused on developing high-yielding commercial varieties of Jatropha curcas through interdisciplinary research cooperation across multiple scientific disciplines.
