= Biodiesel =

Fuel made from vegetable oils or animal fats

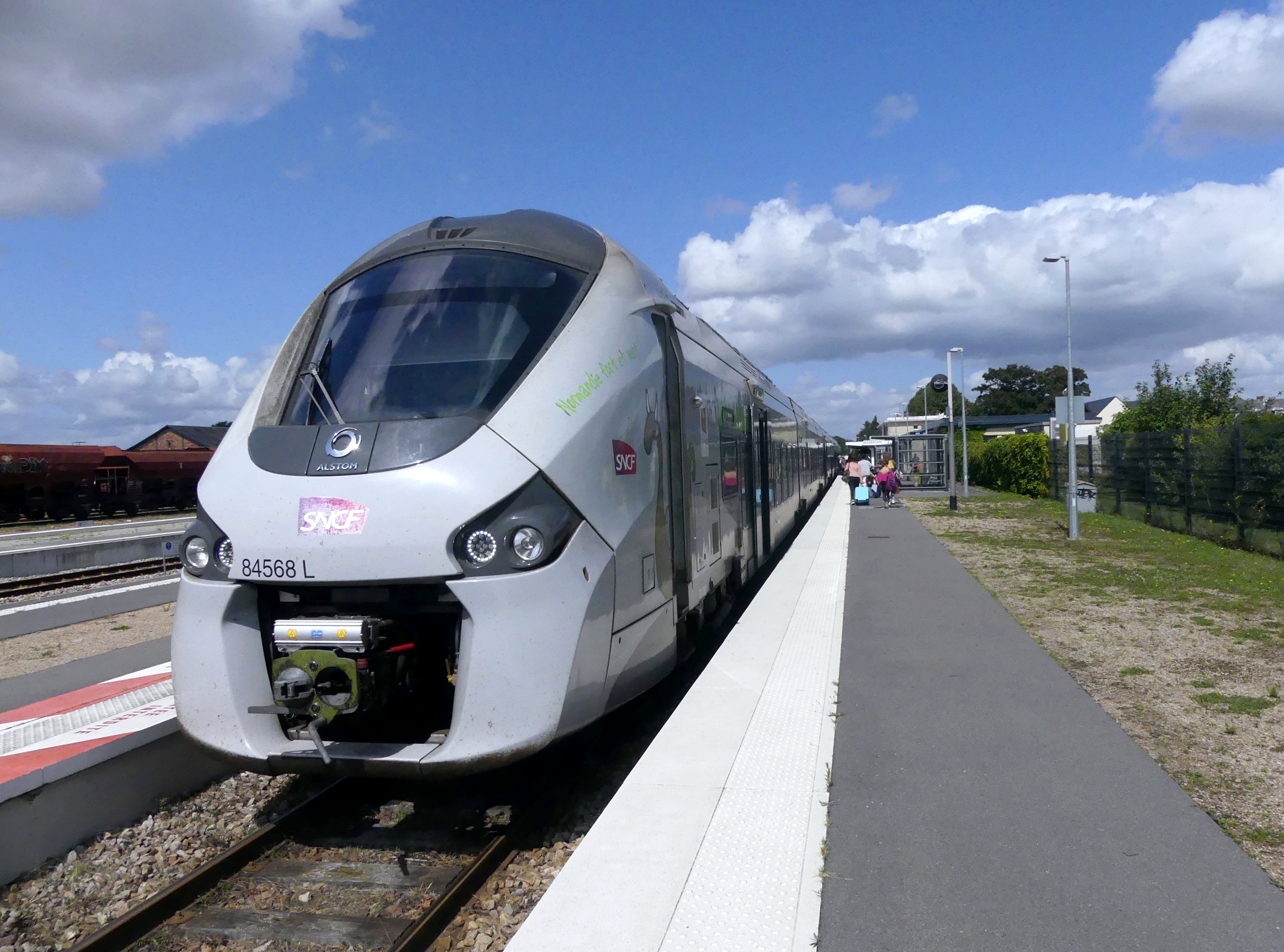
Experimental French Régiolis Class train using biodiesel

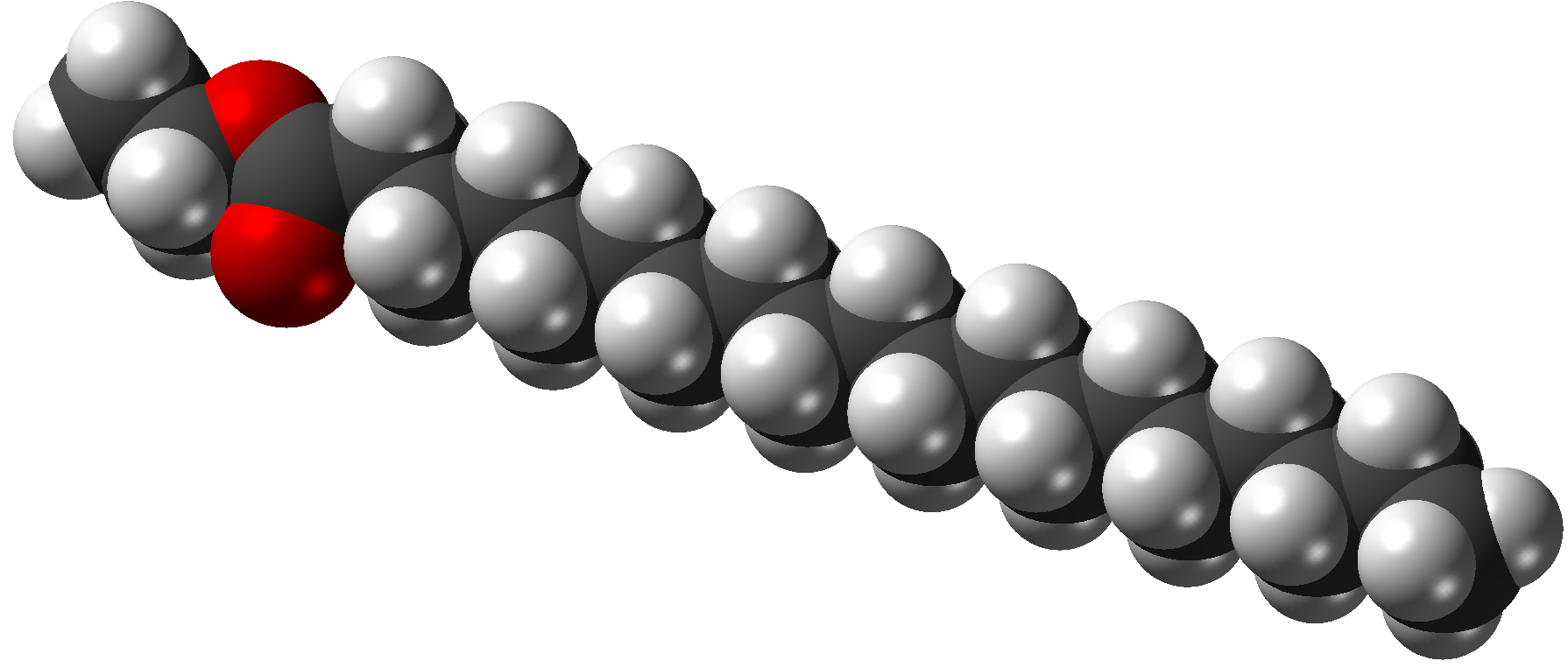
Space-filling model of ethyl stearate, or stearic acid ethyl ester, an ethyl ester produced from soybean or canola oil and ethanol

Two general pathways for biodiesels from a fat. The process starts with hydrogenation of backbone double bonds. Fatty acid methyl esters can then be produced by transesterification. C16 and C18 diesel fuels arise by hydrogenolysis of the saturated fat.

Biodiesel is a renewable biofuel, a form of diesel fuel, derived from biological sources like vegetable oils, animal fats, or recycled greases, and consisting of long-chain fatty acid esters. It is typically made from fats.

The roots of biodiesel as a fuel source can be traced back to when J. Patrick and E. Duffy first conducted transesterification of vegetable oil in 1853, predating Rudolf Diesel's development of the diesel engine. Diesel's engine, initially designed for mineral oil, successfully ran on peanut oil at the 1900 Paris Exposition. This landmark event highlighted the potential of vegetable oils as an alternative fuel source. The interest in using vegetable oils as fuels resurfaced periodically, particularly during resource-constrained periods such as World War II. However, challenges such as high viscosity and resultant engine deposits were significant hurdles. The modern form of biodiesel emerged in the 1930s, when a method was found for transforming vegetable oils for fuel use, laying the groundwork for contemporary biodiesel production.

The physical and chemical properties of biodiesel vary depending on its source and production method. The trade association National Biodiesel Board defines "biodiesel" as a mono-alkyl ester. It has been experimented with in railway locomotives and power generators. Generally characterized by a higher boiling point and flash point than petrodiesel, biodiesel is slightly miscible with water and has distinct lubricating properties. Its calorific value is approximately 9% lower than that of standard diesel, impacting fuel efficiency. Biodiesel production has evolved significantly, with early methods including the direct use of vegetable oils, to more advanced processes like transesterification, which reduces viscosity and improves combustion properties. Notably, biodiesel production generates glycerol as a by-product, which has its own commercial applications.

Biodiesel's primary application is in transport. There have been efforts to make it a drop-in biofuel, meaning compatible with existing diesel engines and distribution infrastructure. However, it is usually blended with petrodiesel, typically to less than 10%, since most engines cannot run on pure biodiesel without modification. The blend percentage of biodiesel is indicated by a "B" factor. B100 represents pure biodiesel, while blends like B20 contain 20% of biodiesel, with the remainder being traditional petrodiesel. These blends offer a compromise between the environmental benefits of biodiesel and performance characteristics of standard diesel fuel. Biodiesel blends can be used as heating oil.

The environmental impact of biodiesel is complex and varies based on factors like feedstock type, land use changes, and production methods. While it can potentially reduce greenhouse gas emissions compared to fossil fuels, concerns about biodiesel include land use changes, deforestation, and the food vs. fuel debate. The debate centers on the impact of biodiesel production on food prices and availability, as well as its overall carbon footprint. Despite these challenges, biodiesel remains a key component in the global strategy to reduce reliance on fossil fuels and mitigate the impacts of climate change.

== Blends ==
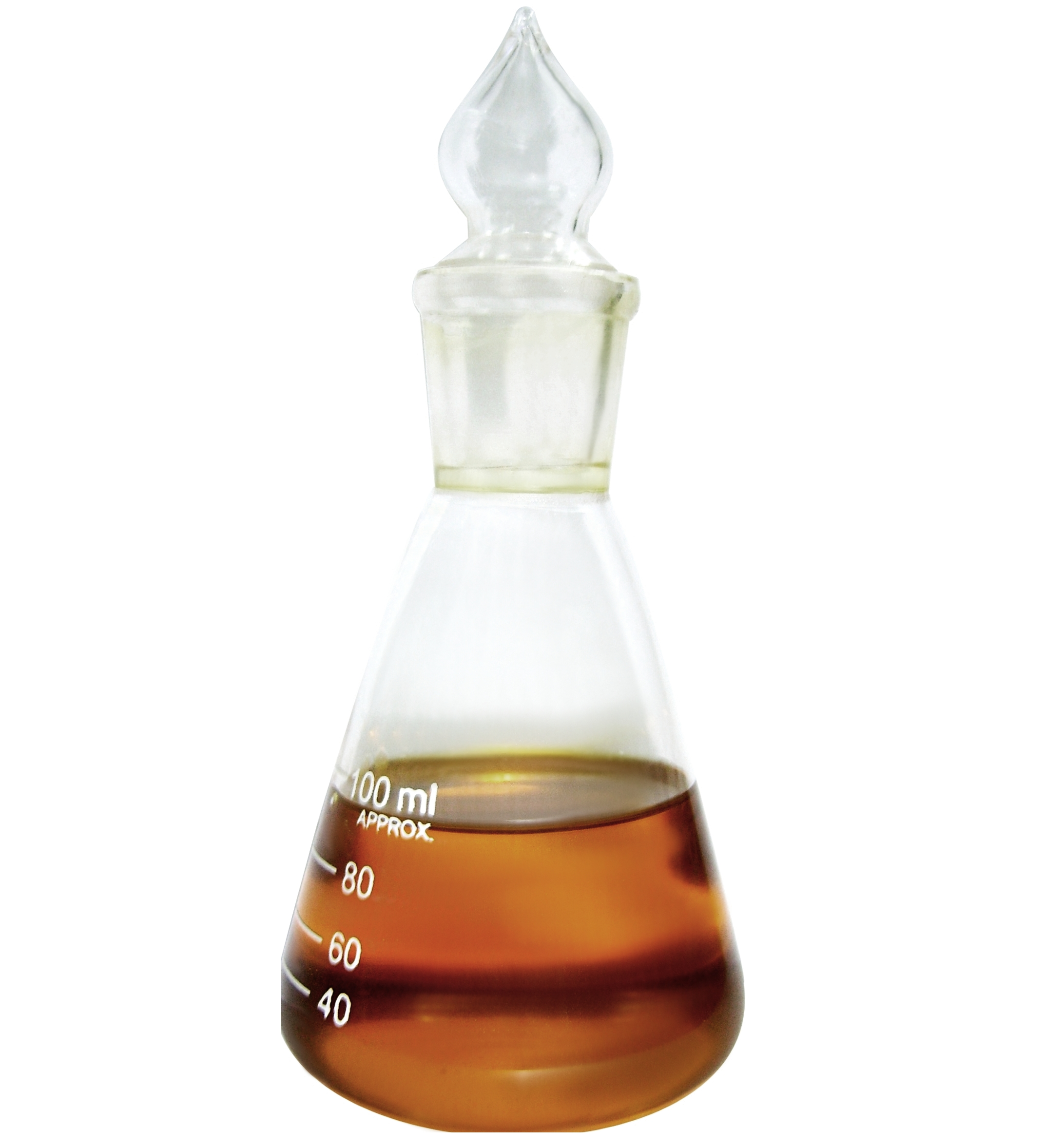
Biodiesel sample

Blends of biodiesel and conventional hydrocarbon-based diesel are most commonly distributed for use in the retail diesel fuel marketplace. Much of the world uses a system known as the "B" factor to state the amount of biodiesel in any fuel mix:

- 100% biodiesel is referred to as B100
- 20% biodiesel, 80% petrodiesel is labeled B20
- 10% biodiesel, 90% petrodiesel is labeled B10
- 7% biodiesel, 93% petrodiesel is labeled B7
- 5% biodiesel, 95% petrodiesel is labeled B5
- 2% biodiesel, 98% petrodiesel is labeled B2

Blends of 20% biodiesel and lower can be used in diesel equipment with no, or only minor modifications, although certain manufacturers do not extend warranty coverage if equipment is damaged by these blends. The B6 to B20 blends are covered by the ASTM D7467 specification. Biodiesel can also be used in its pure form (B100), but may require certain engine modifications to avoid maintenance and performance problems. Blending B100 with petroleum diesel may be accomplished by:

- Mixing in tanks at manufacturing point prior to delivery to tanker truck
- Splash mixing in the tanker truck (adding specific percentages of biodiesel and petroleum diesel)
- In-line mixing, two components arrive at tanker truck simultaneously.
- Metered pump mixing, petroleum diesel and biodiesel meters are set to X total volume.

=== Technical standards ===
Biodiesel has a number of standards for its quality including European standard EN 14214, ASTM International D6751, and National Standard of Canada CAN/CGSB-3.524.

ASTM D6751 (American Society for Testing and Materials) details standards and specifications for biodiesels blended with middle distillate fuels. This specification standard specifies various test methods to be used in the determination of certain properties for biodiesel blends. Some of the tests mentioned include flash point and kinematic viscosity.

== Historical background ==
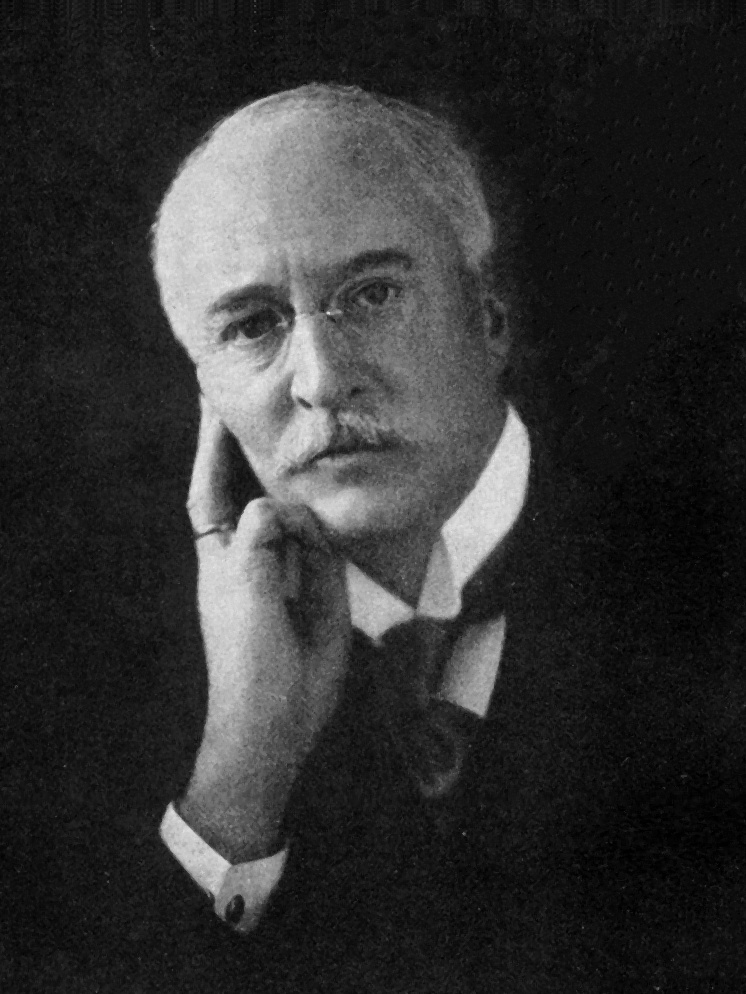
Rudolf Diesel

Transesterification of a vegetable oil was conducted as early as 1853 by Patrick Duffy, four decades before the first diesel engine became functional. Earlier processes for making lamp oil, were patented (1810, Prague) but not published in peer-reviewed publications. Rudolf Diesel's prime model, a single 10 ft (3.05 m) iron cylinder with a flywheel at its base, ran on its own power for the first time in Augsburg, Germany, on 10 August 1893 running on nothing but peanut oil. In remembrance of this event, 10 August has been declared "International Biodiesel Day".

It is often reported that Diesel designed his engine to run on peanut oil, but this is not the case. Diesel stated in his published papers, "at the Paris Exhibition in 1900 (Exposition Universelle) there was shown by the Otto Company a small Diesel engine, which, at the request of the French government ran on arachide (earth-nut or pea-nut) oil (see biodiesel), and worked so smoothly that only a few people were aware of it. The engine was constructed for using mineral oil, and was then worked on vegetable oil without any alterations being made. The French Government at the time thought of testing the applicability to power production of the Arachide, or earth-nut, which grows in considerable quantities in their African colonies, and can easily be cultivated there." Diesel himself later conducted related tests and appeared supportive of the idea. In a 1912 speech Diesel said, "the use of vegetable oils for engine fuels may seem insignificant today but such oils may become, in the course of time, as important as petroleum and the coal-tar products of the present time."

Despite the widespread use of petroleum-derived diesel fuels, interest in vegetable oils as fuels for internal combustion engines was reported in several countries during the 1920s and 30s and later during World War II. Belgium, France, Italy, the United Kingdom, Portugal, Germany, Brazil, Argentina, Japan and China were reported to have tested and used vegetable oils as diesel fuels during this time. Some operational problems were reported due to the high viscosity of vegetable oils compared to petroleum diesel fuel, which results in poor atomization of the fuel in the fuel spray and often leads to deposits and coking of the injectors, combustion chamber and valves. Attempts to overcome these problems included heating of the vegetable oil, blending it with petroleum-derived diesel fuel or ethanol, pyrolysis and cracking of the oils.

On 31 August 1937, Georges Chavanne of the University of Brussels (Belgium) was granted a patent for a "Procedure for the transformation of vegetable oils for their uses as fuels" (fr. "Procédé de Transformation d'Huiles Végétales en Vue de Leur Utilisation comme Carburants") Belgian Patent 422,877. This patent described the alcoholysis (often referred to as transesterification) of vegetable oils using ethanol (and mentions methanol) in order to separate the fatty acids from the glycerol by replacing the glycerol with short linear alcohols. This appears to be the first account of the production of what is known as "biodiesel" today. This is similar (copy) to the patented methods used in the 18th century to make lamp-oil, and may be inspired by some old historical oil lamps, in some places.

More recently, in 1977, Brazilian scientist Expedito Parente invented and submitted for patent, the first industrial process for the production of biodiesel. This process is classified as biodiesel by international norms, conferring a "standardized identity and quality. No other proposed biofuel has been validated by the motor industry." As of 2010, Parente's company Tecbio is working with Boeing and NASA to certify bioquerosene (bio-kerosene), another product produced and patented by the Brazilian scientist.

Research into the use of transesterified sunflower oil, and refining it to diesel fuel standards, was initiated in South Africa in 1979. By 1983, the process for producing fuel-quality, engine-tested biodiesel was completed and published internationally. An Austrian company, Gaskoks, obtained the technology from the South African Agricultural Engineers; the company erected the first biodiesel pilot plant in November 1987, and the first industrial-scale plant in April 1989 (with a capacity of 30,000 tons of rapeseed per annum).

Throughout the 1990s, plants were opened in many European countries, including the Czech Republic, Germany and Sweden. France launched local production of biodiesel fuel (referred to as diester) from rapeseed oil, which is mixed into regular diesel fuel at a level of 5%, and into the diesel fuel used by some captive fleets (e.g. public transportation) at a level of 30%. Renault, Peugeot and other manufacturers have certified truck engines for use with up to that level of partial biodiesel; experiments with 50% biodiesel are underway. During the same period, nations in other parts of the world also saw local production of biodiesel starting up: by 1998, the Austrian Biofuels Institute had identified 21 countries with commercial biodiesel projects. 100% biodiesel is now available at many normal service stations across Europe.

== Properties ==
The color of biodiesel ranges from clear to golden to dark brown, depending on the production method and the feedstock used to make the fuel. This also changes the resulting fuel properties. In general, biodiesel is slightly miscible with water, has a high boiling point and low vapor pressure. The flash point of biodiesel can exceed 130 °C (266 °F), significantly higher than that of petroleum diesel which may be as low as 52 °C (126 °F). Biodiesel has a density around ~0.88 g/cm^{3}, higher than petrodiesel (~0.85 g/cm^{3}).

The calorific value of biodiesel is about 37.27 MJ/kg. This is 9% lower than regular Number 2 petrodiesel. Variations in biodiesel energy density is more dependent on the feedstock used than the production process. Still, these variations are less than for petrodiesel. It has been claimed biodiesel gives better lubricity and more complete combustion thus increasing the engine energy output and partially compensating for the higher energy density of petrodiesel.

Biodiesel also contains virtually no sulfur and although lacking sulfur compounds that in petrodiesel provide much of the lubricity, it has promising lubricating properties and cetane ratings compared to low sulfur diesel fuels and often serves as an additive to ultra-low-sulfur diesel (ULSD) fuel to aid with lubrication. Biodiesel Fuels with higher lubricity may increase the usable life of high-pressure fuel injection equipment that relies on the fuel for its lubrication. Depending on the engine, this might include high pressure injection pumps, pump injectors (also called unit injectors) and fuel injectors.

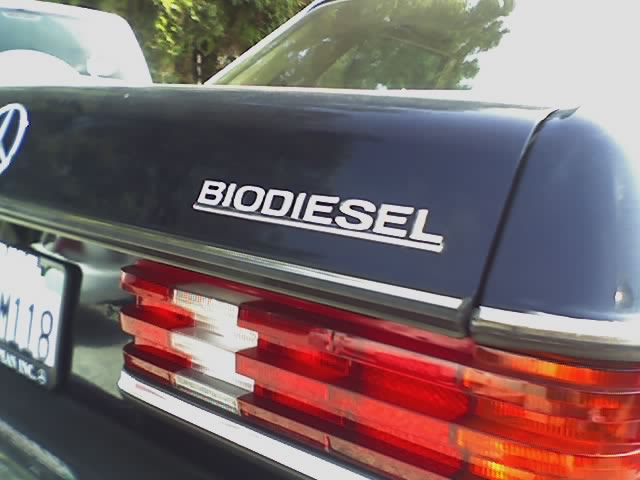
Older diesel Mercedes are popular for running on biodiesel.

== Applications ==
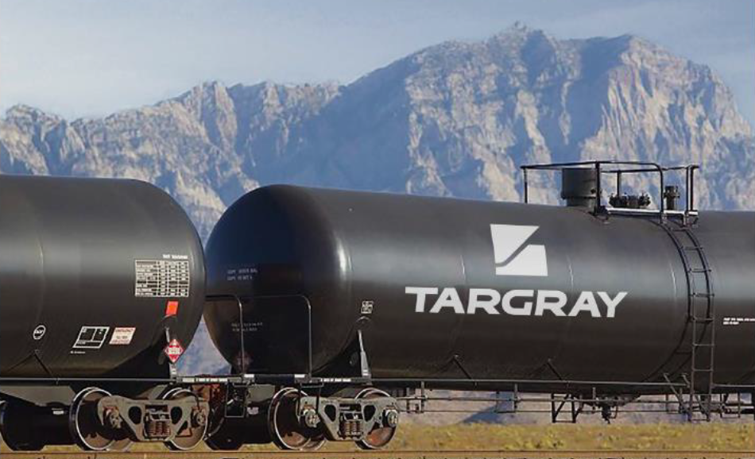
Targray Biofuels railcar transporting Biodiesel.

Biodiesel can be used in pure form (B100) or may be blended with petroleum diesel at any concentration in most injection pump diesel engines. New extreme high-pressure (29,000 psi; 200,000 kPa) common rail engines have strict factory limits of B5 or B20, depending on manufacturer. Biodiesel has different solvent properties from petrodiesel, and will degrade natural rubber gaskets and hoses in vehicles (mostly vehicles manufactured before 1992), although these tend to wear out naturally and most likely will have already been replaced with FKM, which is nonreactive to biodiesel. Biodiesel has been known to break down deposits of residue in the fuel lines where petrodiesel has been used. As a result, fuel filters may become clogged with particulates if a quick transition to pure biodiesel is made. Therefore, it is recommended to change the fuel filters on engines and heaters shortly after first switching to a biodiesel blend.

=== Distribution ===
Since the passage of the Energy Policy Act of 2005, biodiesel use has been increasing in the United States. In the UK, the Renewable Transport Fuel Obligation obliges suppliers to include 5% renewable fuel in all transport fuel sold in the UK by 2010. For road diesel, this effectively means 5% biodiesel (B5).

=== Vehicular use and manufacturer acceptance ===
In 2005, Chrysler (then part of DaimlerChrysler) released the Jeep Liberty CRD diesels from the factory into the European market with 5% biodiesel blends, indicating at least partial acceptance of biodiesel as an acceptable diesel fuel additive. In 2007, DaimlerChrysler indicated its intention to increase warranty coverage to 20% biodiesel blends if biofuel quality in the United States can be standardized.

The Volkswagen Group has released a statement indicating that several of its vehicles are compatible with B5 and B100 made from rapeseed oil and compatible with the EN 14214 standard. The use of the specified biodiesel type in its cars will not void any warranty.

Mercedes-Benz does not allow diesel fuels containing greater than 5% biodiesel (B5) due to concerns about "production shortcomings". Any damages caused by the use of such non-approved fuels will not be covered by the Mercedes-Benz Limited Warranty.

Starting in 2004, the city of Halifax, Nova Scotia decided to update its bus system to allow the fleet of city buses to run entirely on a fish-oil based biodiesel. This caused the city some initial mechanical issues, but after several years of refining, the entire fleet had successfully been converted.

In 2007, McDonald's of UK announced it would start producing biodiesel from the waste oil byproduct of its restaurants. This fuel would be used to run its fleet.

The 2014 Chevy Cruze Clean Turbo Diesel, direct from the factory, will be rated for up to B20 (blend of 20% biodiesel / 80% regular diesel) biodiesel compatibility

=== Railway usage ===
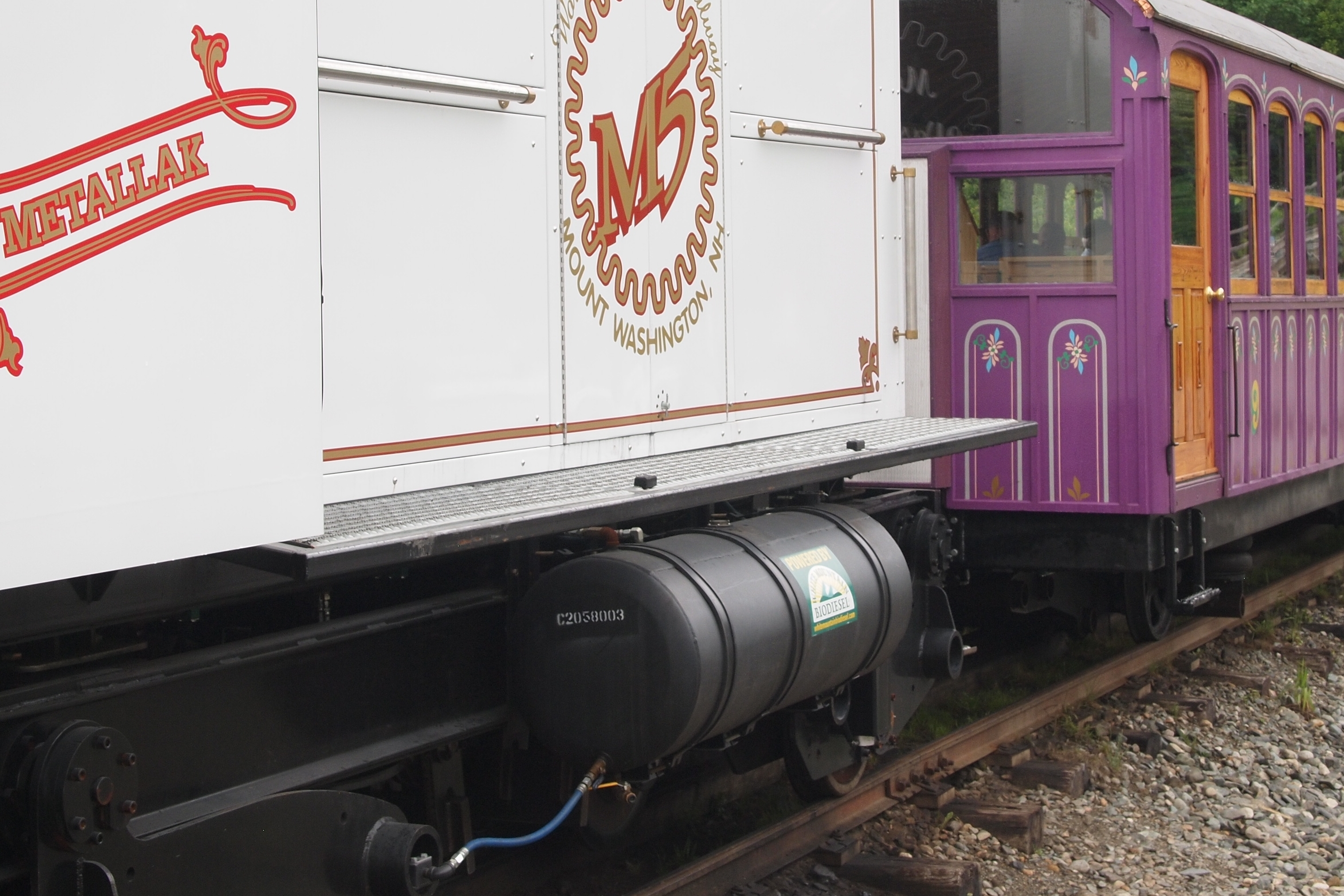
Biodiesel locomotive and its external fuel tank at Mount Washington Cog Railway

British train operating company Virgin Trains West Coast claimed to have run the UK's first "biodiesel train", when a Class 220 was converted to run on 80% petrodiesel and 20% biodiesel.

The British Royal Train on 15 September 2007 completed its first ever journey run on 100% biodiesel fuel supplied by Green Fuels Ltd. Prince Charles and Green Fuels managing director James Hygate were the first passengers on a train fueled entirely by biodiesel fuel. Since 2007, the Royal Train has operated successfully on B100 (100% biodiesel). A government white paper also proposed converting large portions of the UK railways to biodiesel but the proposal was subsequently dropped in favour of further electrification.

Similarly, a state-owned short-line railroad in Eastern Washington ran a test of a 25% biodiesel / 75% petrodiesel blend during the summer of 2008, purchasing fuel from a biodiesel producer sited along the railroad tracks. The train will be powered by biodiesel made in part from canola grown in agricultural regions through which the short line runs.

Also in 2007, Disneyland began running the park trains on B98 (98% biodiesel). The program was discontinued in 2008 due to storage issues, but in January 2009, it was announced that the park would then be running all trains on biodiesel manufactured from its own used cooking oils. This is a change from running the trains on soy-based biodiesel.

In 2007, the historic Mt. Washington Cog Railway added the first biodiesel locomotive to its all-steam locomotive fleet. The fleet has climbed up the western slopes of Mount Washington in New Hampshire since 1868 with a peak vertical climb of 37.4 degrees.

In 2009, the Grand Canyon Railway started running engine 4960 on used cooking oil.

On 8 July 2014, the then Indian Railway Minister D.V. Sadananda Gowda announced in Railway Budget that 5% bio-diesel will be used in Indian Railways' Diesel Engines.

=== As a heating oil ===
Biodiesel can also be used as a heating fuel in domestic and commercial boilers, a mix of heating oil and biofuel which is standardized and taxed slightly differently from diesel fuel used for transportation. Bioheat fuel is a proprietary blend of biodiesel and traditional heating oil. Bioheat is a registered trademark of the National Biodiesel Board [NBB] and the National Oilheat Research Alliance [NORA] in the United States, and Columbia Fuels in Canada. Heating biodiesel is available in various blends. ASTM 396 recognizes blends of up to 5 percent biodiesel as equivalent to pure petroleum heating oil. Blends of higher levels of up to 20% biofuel are used by many consumers. Research is underway to determine whether such blends affect performance.

Older furnaces may contain rubber parts that would be affected by biodiesel's solvent properties, but can otherwise burn biodiesel without any conversion required. Care must be taken, given that varnishes left behind by petrodiesel will be released and can clog pipes—fuel filtering and prompt filter replacement is required. Another approach is to start using biodiesel as a blend, and decreasing the petroleum proportion over time can allow the varnishes to come off more gradually and be less likely to clog. Due to biodiesel's strong solvent properties, the furnace is cleaned out and generally becomes more efficient.

A law passed under Massachusetts Governor Deval Patrick requires all home heating diesel in that state to be 2% biofuel by July 1, 2010, and 5% biofuel by 2013. New York City has passed a similar law.

=== Cleaning oil spills ===
With 80–90% of oil spill costs invested in shoreline cleanup, there is a search for more efficient and cost-effective methods to extract oil spills from the shorelines. Biodiesel has displayed its capacity to significantly dissolve crude oil, depending on the source of the fatty acids. In a laboratory setting, oiled sediments that simulated polluted shorelines were sprayed with a single coat of biodiesel and exposed to simulated tides. Biodiesel is an effective solvent to oil due to its methyl ester component, which considerably lowers the viscosity of the crude oil. Additionally, it has a higher buoyancy than crude oil, which later aids in its removal. As a result, 80% of oil was removed from cobble and fine sand, 50% in coarse sand, and 30% in gravel. Once the oil is liberated from the shoreline, the oil-biodiesel mixture is manually removed from the water surface with skimmers. Any remaining mixture is easily broken down due to the high biodegradability of biodiesel, and the increased surface area exposure of the mixture.

=== Biodiesel in generators ===
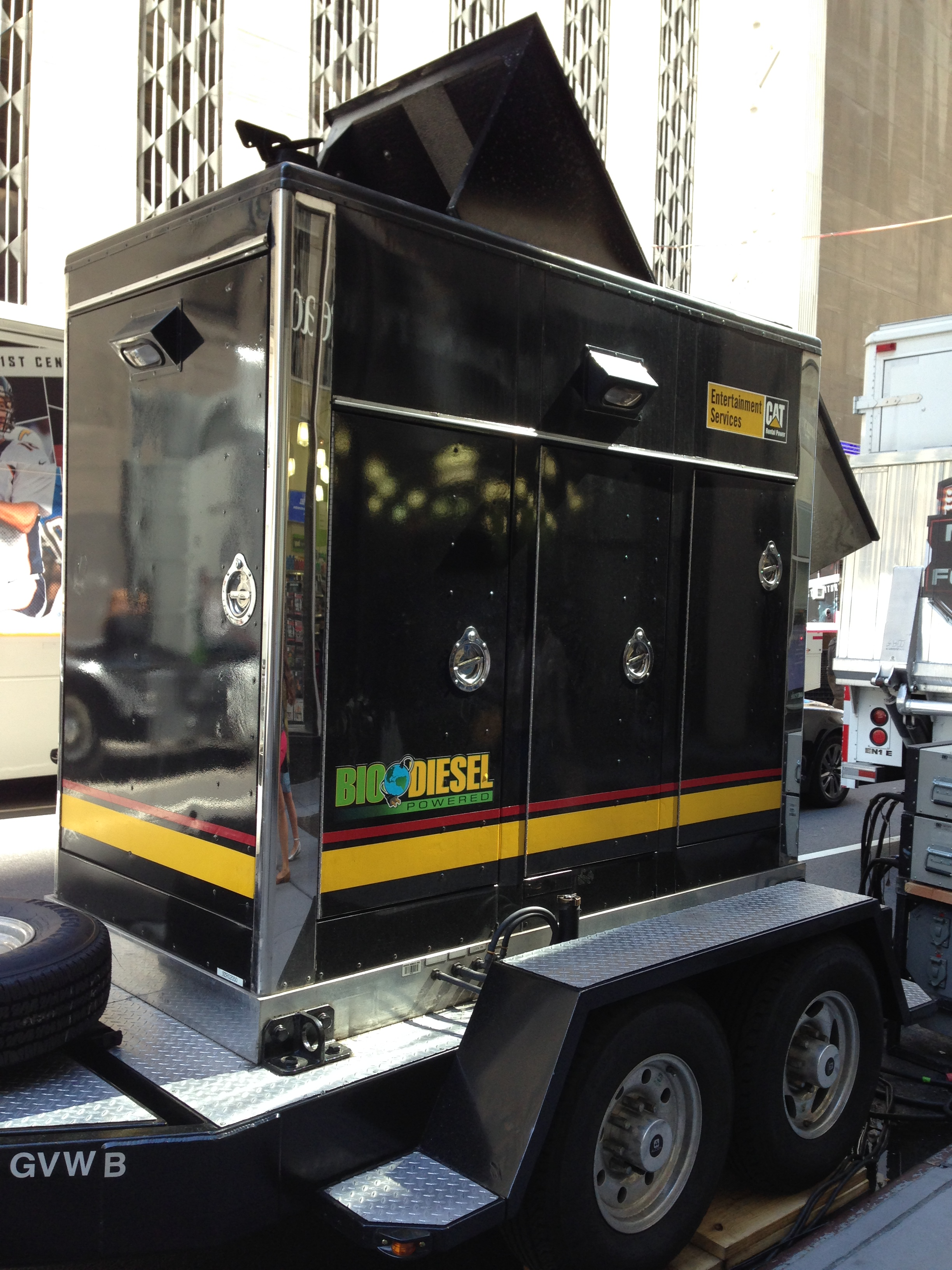
Biodiesel is also used in rental generators

In 2001, UC Riverside installed a 6-megawatt backup power system that is entirely fueled by biodiesel. Backup diesel-fueled generators allow companies to avoid damaging blackouts of critical operations at the expense of high pollution and emission rates. By using B100, these generators were able to essentially eliminate the byproducts that result in smog, ozone, and sulfur emissions. The use of these generators in residential areas around schools, hospitals, and the general public result in substantial reductions in poisonous carbon monoxide and particulate matter.

== Effects ==
=== Fuel efficiency ===
The power output of biodiesel depends on its blend, quality, and load conditions under which the fuel is burnt. The thermal efficiency for example of B100 as compared to B20 will vary due to the differing energy content of the various blends. Thermal efficiency of a fuel is based in part on fuel characteristics such as: viscosity, specific density, and flash point; these characteristics will change as the blends as well as the quality of biodiesel varies. The American Society for Testing and Materials has set standards in order to judge the quality of a given fuel sample.

One study found that the brake thermal efficiency of B40 was superior to traditional petroleum counterpart at higher compression ratios (this higher brake thermal efficiency was recorded at compression ratios of 21:1). It was noted that, as the compression ratios increased, the efficiency of all fuel types – as well as blends being tested – increased; though it was found that a blend of B40 was the most economical at a compression ratio of 21:1 over all other blends. The study implied that this increase in efficiency was due to fuel density, viscosity, and heating values of the fuels.

=== Combustion ===
Fuel systems on some modern diesel engines were not designed to accommodate biodiesel, while many heavy duty engines are able to run with biodiesel blends up to B20. Traditional direct injection fuel systems operate at roughly 3,000 psi (21,000 kPa) at the injector tip while the modern common rail fuel system operates upwards of 30,000 psi (210,000 kPa) at the injector tip. Components are designed to operate at a great temperature range, from below freezing to over 1,000 °F (560 °C). Diesel fuel is expected to burn efficiently and produce as few emissions as possible. As emission standards are being introduced to diesel engines the need to control harmful emissions is being designed into the parameters of diesel engine fuel systems. The traditional inline injection system is more forgiving to poorer quality fuels as opposed to the common rail fuel system. The higher pressures and tighter tolerances of the common rail system allows for greater control over atomization and injection timing. This control of atomization as well as combustion allows for greater efficiency of modern diesel engines as well as greater control over emissions. Components within a diesel fuel system interact with the fuel in a way to ensure efficient operation of the fuel system and so the engine. If an out-of-specification fuel is introduced to a system that has specific parameters of operation, then the integrity of the overall fuel system may be compromised. Some of these parameters such as spray pattern and atomization are directly related to injection timing.

One study found that during atomization, biodiesel and its blends produced droplets greater in diameter than the droplets produced by traditional petrodiesel. The smaller droplets were attributed to the lower viscosity and surface tension of traditional diesel fuel. It was found that droplets at the periphery of the spray pattern were larger in diameter than the droplets at the center. This was attributed to the faster pressure drop at the edge of the spray pattern; there was a proportional relationship between the droplet size and the distance from the injector tip. It was found that B100 had the greatest spray penetration, this was attributed to the greater density of B100. Having a greater droplet size can lead to inefficiencies in the combustion, increased emissions, and decreased horse power. In another study it was found that there is a short injection delay when injecting biodiesel. This injection delay was attributed to the greater viscosity of Biodiesel. It was noted that the higher viscosity and the greater cetane rating of biodiesel over traditional petrodiesel lead to poor atomization, as well as mixture penetration with air during the ignition delay period. Another study noted that this ignition delay may aid in a decrease of NO_{x} emission.

=== Emissions ===
Emissions are inherent to the combustion of diesel fuels that are regulated by the U.S. Environmental Protection Agency (E.P.A.). As these emissions are a byproduct of the combustion process, in order to ensure E.P.A. compliance a fuel system must be capable of controlling the combustion of fuels as well as the mitigation of emissions. There are a number of new technologies being phased in to control the production of diesel emissions. The exhaust gas recirculation system, E.G.R., and the diesel particulate filter, D.P.F., are both designed to mitigate the production of harmful emissions.

The feedstock used to make the biodiesel fuel can significantly alter the resulting exhaust gas and particulate matter emissions, even when blended with commercial diesel fuel. A study performed by the Chonbuk National University concluded that a B30 biodiesel blend reduced carbon monoxide emissions by approximately 83% and particulate matter emissions by roughly 33%. NO_{x} emissions, however, were found to increase without the application of an E.G.R. system. The study also concluded that, with E.G.R, a B20 biodiesel blend considerably reduced the emissions of the engine. Additionally, analysis by the California Air Resources Board found that biodiesel had the lowest carbon emissions of the fuels tested, those being ultra-low-sulfur diesel, gasoline, corn-based ethanol, compressed natural gas, and five types of biodiesel from varying feedstocks. Their conclusions also showed great variance in carbon emissions of biodiesel based on the feedstock used. Of soy, tallow, canola, corn, and used cooking oil, soy showed the highest carbon emissions, while used cooking oil produced the lowest.

While studying the effect of biodiesel on diesel particulate filters, it was found that though the presence of sodium and potassium carbonates aided in the catalytic conversion of ash, as the diesel particulates are catalyzed, they may congregate inside the D.P.F. and so interfere with the clearances of the filter. This may cause the filter to clog and interfere with the regeneration process. In a study on the impact of E.G.R. rates with blends of jathropa biodiesel it was shown that there was a decrease in fuel efficiency and torque output due to the use of biodiesel on a diesel engine designed with an E.G.R. system. It was found that CO and CO_{2} emissions increased with an increase in exhaust gas recirculation but NO_{x} levels decreased. The opacity level of the jathropa blends was in an acceptable range, where traditional diesel was out of acceptable standards. It was shown that a decrease in Nox emissions could be obtained with an E.G.R. system. This study showed an advantage over traditional diesel within a certain operating range of the E.G.R. system.

As of 2017, blended biodiesel fuels (especially B5, B8, and B20) are regularly used in many heavy-duty vehicles, especially transit buses in US cities. Characterization of exhaust emissions showed significant emission reductions compared to regular diesel.

=== Material compatibility ===
- Plastics: High-density polyethylene (HDPE) is compatible but polyvinyl chloride (PVC) is slowly degraded and polystyrene dissolves on contact.
- Metals: Biodiesel (like methanol) has an effect on copper-based materials (e.g. brass), and it also affects zinc, tin, lead, and cast iron. Stainless steels (316 and 304) and aluminum are unaffected.
- Rubber: Biodiesel also affects types of natural rubbers found in some older engine components. Studies have also found that fluorinated elastomers (FKM) cured with peroxide and base-metal oxides can be degraded when biodiesel loses its stability caused by oxidation. Commonly used synthetic rubbers FKM- GBL-S and FKM- GF-S found in modern vehicles were found to handle biodiesel in all conditions.

== Production ==
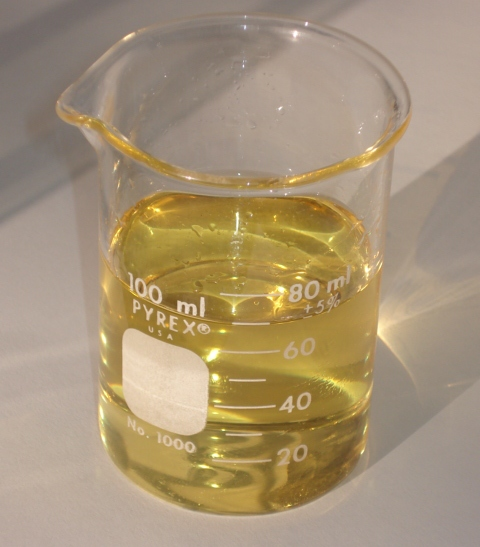
Pure biodiesel (B-100) made from soybeans

Biodiesel is commonly produced by the transesterification of the vegetable oil or animal fat feedstock, and other non-edible raw materials such as frying oil, etc. There are several methods for carrying out this transesterification reaction including the common batch process, heterogeneous catalysts, supercritical processes, ultrasonic methods, and even microwave methods.

Chemically, transesterified biodiesel comprises a mix of mono-alkyl esters of long chain fatty acids. The most common form uses methanol (converted to sodium methoxide) to produce methyl esters (commonly referred to as Fatty Acid Methyl Ester – FAME) as it is the cheapest alcohol available, though ethanol can be used to produce an ethyl ester (commonly referred to as Fatty Acid Ethyl Ester – FAEE) biodiesel and higher alcohols such as isopropanol and butanol have also been used. Using alcohols of higher molecular weights improves the cold flow properties of the resulting ester, at the cost of a less efficient transesterification reaction. A lipid transesterification production process is used to convert the base oil to the desired esters. Any free fatty acids (FFAs) in the base oil are either converted to soap and removed from the process, or they are esterified (yielding more biodiesel) using an acidic catalyst. After this processing, unlike straight vegetable oil, biodiesel has combustion properties very similar to those of petroleum diesel, and can replace it in most current uses.

The methanol used in most biodiesel production processes is made using fossil fuel inputs. However, there are sources of renewable methanol made using carbon dioxide or biomass as feedstock, making their production processes free of fossil fuels.

A by-product of the transesterification process is the production of glycerol. For every 1 tonne of biodiesel that is manufactured, 100 kg of glycerol are produced. Originally, there was a valuable market for the glycerol, which assisted the economics of the process as a whole. However, with the increase in global biodiesel production, the market price for this crude glycerol (containing 20% water and catalyst residues) has crashed. Research is being conducted globally to use this glycerol as a chemical building block (see chemical intermediate under Wikipedia article "Glycerol"). One initiative in the UK is The Glycerol Challenge.

Usually this crude glycerol has to be purified, typically by performing vacuum distillation. This is rather energy intensive. The refined glycerol (98%+ purity) can then be utilised directly, or converted into other products. The following announcements were made in 2007: A joint venture of Ashland Inc. and Cargill announced plans to make propylene glycol in Europe from glycerol and Dow Chemical announced similar plans for North America. Dow also plans to build a plant in China to make epichlorhydrin from glycerol. Epichlorohydrin is a raw material for epoxy resins.

Global biodiesel production reached 3.8 million tons in 2005. Approximately 85% of biodiesel production came from the European Union.

=== Production levels ===
As of 2024, world production of biodiesel (fatty acid methyl ester) was about 50 billion litres. The largest producers were Indonesia, the European Union mostly from rapeseed oil and used cooking oil) and Brazil mostly from soybean oil. In the EU, Germany and Poland together produced nearly half of the total.

In the United States, the Renewable Fuel Standard drives demand for both biodiesel and renewable diesel. Renewable diesel is a chemically different fuel that is made from the same feedstocks. In 2024 the US produced 13 billion litres of renewable diesel, more than any other country.

Production levels depend mainly on government blending mandates. Updated figures are published every year by the World Bioenergy Association and in the Energy Institute's Statistical Review of World Energy. es.

Some typical yields
Crop	Yield	
Crop	L/ha	US gal/acre
Palm oil	4752	508
Coconut	2151	230
Cyperus esculentus (Note: Makareviciene et al., "Opportunities for the use of chufa sedge in biodiesel production", Industrial Crops and Products, 50 (2013) p. 635, table 2.)	1628	174
Rapeseed	954	102
Soy (Indiana)	554-922	59.2–98.6
Chinese tallow (Note: Klass, Donald, "Biomass for Renewable Energy, Fuels, and Chemicals", page 341. Academic Press, 1998.) (Note: Kitani, Osamu, "Volume V: Energy and Biomass Engineering, CIGR Handbook of Agricultural Engineering", Amer Society of Agricultural, 1999.)	907	97
Peanut	842	90
Sunflower	767	82
Hemp	242	26

=== Efficiency and economic arguments ===
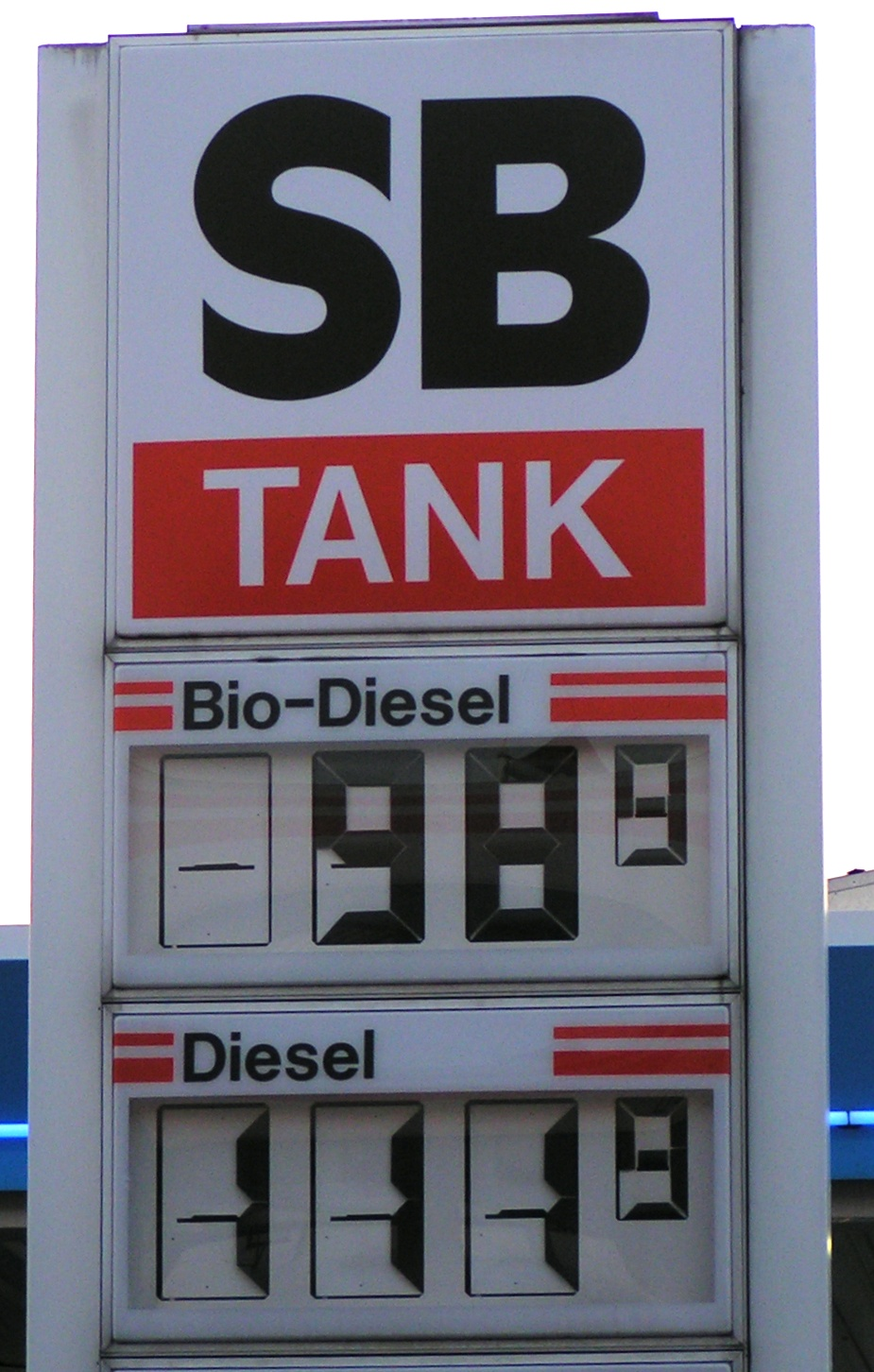
In some countries biodiesel is less expensive than conventional diesel

Transitioning fully to biofuels could require immense tracts of land if traditional food crops are used (although non food crops can be utilized). The problem would be especially severe for nations with large economies, since energy consumption scales with economic output.

For third world countries, biodiesel sources that use marginal land could make more sense; e.g., pongam oiltree nuts grown along roads or jatropha grown along rail lines.

In tropical regions, such as Malaysia and Indonesia, plants that produce palm oil are being planted at a rapid pace to supply growing biodiesel demand in Europe and other markets. Scientists have shown that the removal of rainforest for palm plantations is not ecologically sound since the expansion of oil palm plantations poses a threat to natural rainforest and biodiversity.

It has been estimated in Germany that palm oil diesel has less than one third of the production costs of rapeseed biodiesel.

In the US, the production of biodiesel was reported in 2018 to support more than 64,000 jobs. The growth in biodiesel also helps significantly increase GDP. In 2011, biodiesel created more than $3 billion in GDP.

== Energy security ==
One of the main drivers for adoption of biodiesel is energy security. This means that a nation's dependence on oil is reduced, and substituted with use of locally available sources, such as coal, gas, or renewable sources. Thus a country can benefit from adoption of biofuels, without a reduction in greenhouse gas emissions. While the total energy balance is debated, it is clear that the dependence on oil is reduced. One example is the energy used to manufacture fertilizers, which could come from a variety of sources other than petroleum. The US National Renewable Energy Laboratory (NREL) states that energy security is the number one driving force behind the US biofuels programme, and a White House "Energy Security for the 21st Century" paper makes it clear that energy security is a major reason for promoting biodiesel. The former EU commission president, Jose Manuel Barroso, speaking at a recent EU biofuels conference, stressed that properly managed biofuels have the potential to reinforce the EU's security of supply through diversification of energy sources.

== Global biofuel policies ==
Many countries around the world are involved in the growing use and production of biofuels, such as biodiesel, as an alternative energy source to fossil fuels and oil. To foster the biofuel industry, governments have implemented legislations and laws as incentives to reduce oil dependency and to increase the use of renewable energies. Many countries have their own independent policies regarding the taxation and rebate of biodiesel use, import, and production.

=== Canada ===
It was required by the Canadian Environmental Protection Act Bill C-33 that by 2010, gasoline contained 5% renewable content and that by 2013, diesel and heating oil contained 2% renewable content. The EcoENERGY for Biofuels Program subsidized the production of biodiesel, among other biofuels, via an incentive rate of CAN$0.20 per liter from 2008 to 2010. A decrease of $0.04 will be applied every year following, until the incentive rate reaches $0.06 in 2016. Individual provinces also have specific legislative measures in regards to biofuel use and production.

=== United States ===
The Volumetric Ethanol Excise Tax Credit (VEETC) was the main source of financial support for biofuels, but was scheduled to expire in 2010. Through this act, biodiesel production guaranteed a tax credit of US$1 per gallon produced from virgin oils, and $0.50 per gallon made from recycled oils. Currently soybean oil is being used to produce soybean biodiesel for many commercial purposes such as blending fuel for transportation sectors.

=== European Union ===
The European Union is the greatest producer of biodiesel, with France and Germany being the top producers. To increase the use of biodiesel, there are policies requiring the blending of biodiesel into fuels, including penalties if those rates are not reached. In France, the goal was to reach 10% integration but plans for that stopped in 2010. As an incentive for the European Union countries to continue the production of the biofuel, there are tax rebates for specific quotas of biofuel produced. In Germany, the minimum percentage of biodiesel in transport diesel is set at 7% so called "B7".

=== United Kingdom ===
The United Kingdom's Renewable Transport Fuel Obligation (RTFO) requires fuel suppliers to blend a percentage of renewable fuels into their supply, with a target of 12.4% by 2032. The UK also mandates B7 diesel (7% biodiesel) and E10 petrol (10% bioethanol). Tax incentives and grants, such as the Bus Service Operators' Grant (BSOG), further encourage biodiesel use.

=== Malaysia ===
Malaysia plans to implement its nationwide adoption of the B20 palm oil biofuel programme by the end of 2022. The mandate to manufacture biofuel with a 20% palm oil component - known as B20 - for the transport sector was first rolled out in January 2020 but faced delays due to movement curbs imposed to contain coronavirus outbreaks.

== Issues and concerns ==
=== Food, land and water vs. fuel ===
Up to 40% of corn produced in the United States is used to make ethanol, and worldwide 10% of all grain is turned into biofuel. A 50% reduction in grain used for biofuels in the US and Europe would replace all of Ukraine's grain exports.

In some poor countries the rising price of vegetable oil is causing problems. Some propose that fuel only be made from non-edible vegetable oils such as camelina, jatropha or seashore mallow which can thrive on marginal agricultural land where many trees and crops will not grow, or would produce only low yields.

Others argue that the problem is more fundamental. Farmers may switch from producing food crops to producing biofuel crops to make more money, even if the new crops are not edible. The law of supply and demand predicts that if fewer farmers are producing food the price of food will rise. It may take some time, as farmers can take some time to change which things they are growing, but increasing demand for first generation biofuels is likely to result in price increases for many kinds of food. Some have argued that there are poor farmers and poor countries who are making more money because of the higher price of vegetable oil.

Biodiesel from sea algae would not necessarily displace terrestrial land currently used for food production and new algaculture jobs could be created.

By comparison it should be mentioned that the production of biogas utilizes agricultural waste to generate a biofuel known as biogas, and also produces compost, thereby enhancing agriculture, sustainability and food production.

=== Environmental impact of biodiesel ===
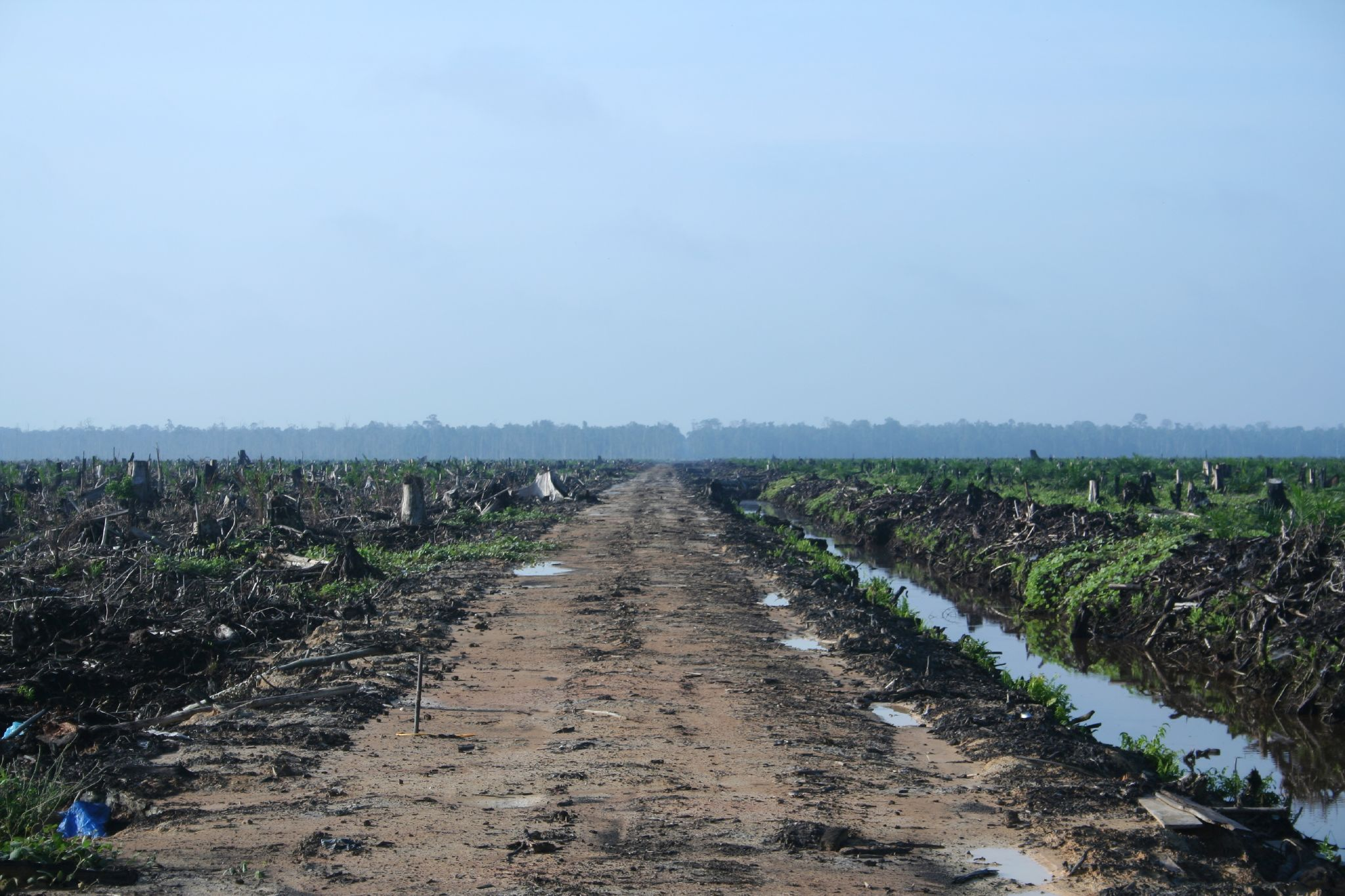
Deforestation in Indonesia, to make way for an oil palm plantation.

The surge of interest in biodiesels has highlighted a number of environmental effects associated with its use. These potentially include reductions in greenhouse gas emissions, deforestation, pollution and the rate of biodegradation.

According to the Renewable Fuel Standards Program Regulatory Impact Analysis, released by the Environmental Protection Agency (EPA) of the United States in February 2010, biodiesel from soy oil results, on average, in a 57% reduction in greenhouse gases compared to petroleum diesel, and biodiesel produced from waste grease results in an 86% reduction. See chapter 2.6 of the EPA report for more detailed information.

However, environmental organizations, for example, Rainforest Rescue and Greenpeace, criticize the cultivation of plants used for biodiesel production, e.g., oil palms, soybeans and sugar cane. The deforestation of rainforests exacerbates climate change and sensitive ecosystems are destroyed to clear land for oil palm, soybean and sugar cane plantations. Moreover, that biofuels contribute to world hunger, since arable land is no longer used for growing foods. The Environmental Protection Agency published data in January 2012, showing that biofuels made from palm oil will not count towards the renewable fuels mandate of the United States as they are not climate-friendly. Environmentalists welcome the conclusion because the growth of oil palm plantations has driven tropical deforestation, for example, in Indonesia and Malaysia.

Indonesia produces biodiesel primarily from palm oil. Since agricultural land is limited, in order to plant monocultures of oil palms, land used for other cultivations or the tropical forest need to be cleared. A major environmental threat is then the destruction of rainforests in Indonesia.

The environmental impact of biodiesel is diverse and not clearcut. An often mentioned incentive for using biodiesel is its capacity to lower greenhouse gas emissions compared to those of fossil fuels. Whether this is true or not depends on many factors.

==== Greenhouse gas emissions ====
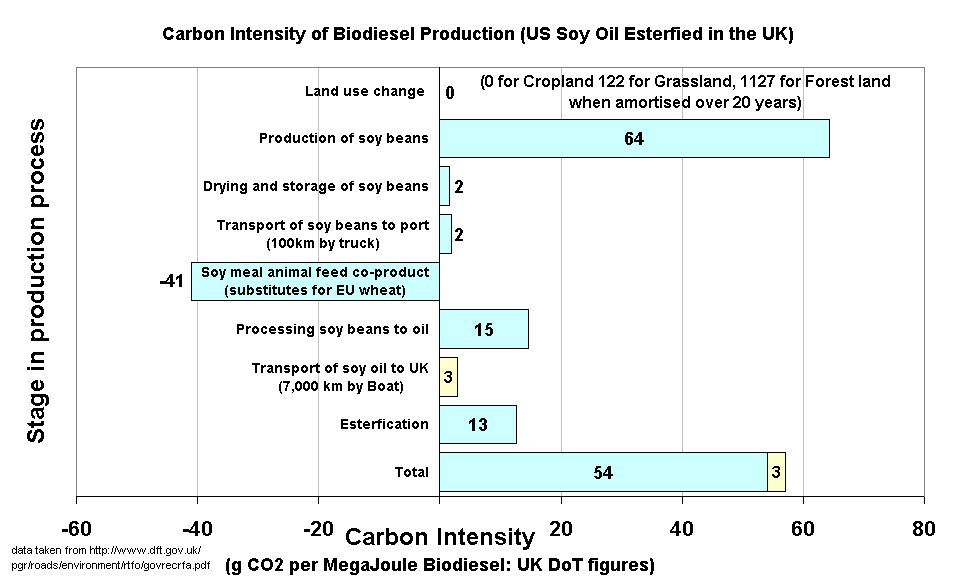
Calculation of Carbon Intensity of Soy biodiesel grown in the US and burnt in the UK, using figures calculated by the UK government for the purposes of the Renewable transport fuel obligation.

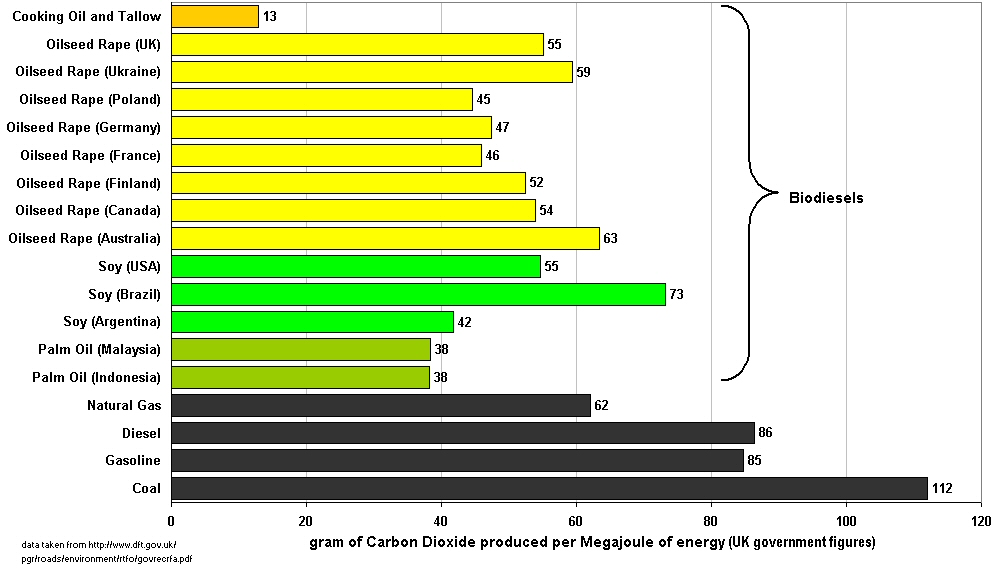
Graph of UK figures for the Carbon Intensity of Biodiesels and fossil fuels. This graph assumes that all biodiesel is used in its country of origin. It also assumes that the diesel is produced from pre-existing croplands rather than by changing land use

A general critique against biodiesel is the land use change, which have potential to cause even more emissions than what would be caused by using fossil fuels alone. Yet this problem would be fixed with algal biofuel which can use land unsuitable for agriculture.

Carbon dioxide is one of the major greenhouse gases. Although the burning of biodiesel produces carbon dioxide emissions similar to those from ordinary fossil fuels, the plant feedstock used in the production absorbs carbon dioxide from the atmosphere when it grows. Plants absorb carbon dioxide through a process known as photosynthesis which allows it to store energy from sunlight in the form of sugars and starches. After the biomass is converted into biodiesel and burned as fuel the energy and carbon is released again. Some of that energy can be used to power an engine while the carbon dioxide is released back into the atmosphere.

When considering the total amount of greenhouse gas emissions it is therefore important to consider the whole production process and what indirect effects such production might cause. The effect on carbon dioxide emissions is highly dependent on production methods and the type of feedstock used. Calculating the carbon intensity of biofuels is a complex and inexact process, and is highly dependent on the assumptions made in the calculation. A calculation usually includes:

- Emissions from growing the feedstock (e.g. Petrochemicals used in fertilizers)
- Emissions from transporting the feedstock to the factory
- Emissions from processing the feedstock into biodiesel
- Absorption of CO_{2} Emissions from growing the feedstock

Other factors can be very significant but are sometimes not considered. These include:

- Emissions from the change in land use of the area where the fuel feedstock is grown.
- Emissions from transportation of the biodiesel from the factory to its point of use
- The efficiency of the biodiesel compared with standard diesel
- The amount of Carbon Dioxide produced at the tail pipe. (Biodiesel can produce 4.7% more)
- The benefits due to the production of useful by-products, such as cattle feed or glycerine

If land use change is not considered and assuming today's production methods, biodiesel from rapeseed and sunflower oil produce 45%-65% lower greenhouse gas emissions than petrodiesel. However, there is ongoing research to improve the efficiency of the production process. Biodiesel produced from used cooking oil or other waste fat could reduce CO_{2} emissions by as much as 85%. As long as the feedstock is grown on existing cropland, land use change has little or no effect on greenhouse gas emissions. However, there is concern that increased feedstock production directly affects the rate of deforestation. Such clearcutting cause carbon stored in the forest, soil and peat layers to be released. The amount of greenhouse gas emissions from deforestation is so large that the benefits from lower emissions (caused by biodiesel use alone) would be negligible for hundreds of years. Biofuel produced from feedstock such as palm oil could therefore cause much higher carbon dioxide emissions than some types of fossil fuels.

==== Pollution ====
In the United States, biodiesel is the only alternative fuel to have successfully completed the Health Effects Testing requirements (Tier I and Tier II) of the Clean Air Act (1990).

Biodiesel can reduce the direct tailpipe-emission of particulates, small particles of solid combustion products, on vehicles with particulate filters by as much as 20 percent compared with low-sulfur (< 50 ppm) diesel. Particulate emissions as the result of production are reduced by around 50 percent compared with fossil-sourced diesel.

==== Biodegradation ====
A University of Idaho study compared biodegradation rates of biodiesel, neat vegetable oils, biodiesel and petroleum diesel blends, and neat 2-D diesel fuel. Using low concentrations of the product to be degraded (10 ppm) in nutrient and sewage sludge amended solutions, they demonstrated that biodiesel degraded at the same rate as a dextrose control and 5 times as quickly as petroleum diesel over a period of 28 days, and that biodiesel blends doubled the rate of petroleum diesel degradation through co-metabolism. The same study examined soil degradation using 10 000 ppm of biodiesel and petroleum diesel, and found biodiesel degraded at twice the rate of petroleum diesel in soil. In all cases, it was determined biodiesel also degraded more completely than petroleum diesel, which produced poorly degradable undetermined intermediates. Toxicity studies for the same project demonstrated no mortalities and few toxic effects on rats and rabbits with up to 5000 mg/kg of biodiesel. Petroleum diesel showed no mortalities at the same concentration either; however, toxic effects such as hair loss and urinary discolouring were noted with concentrations of >2000 mg/L in rabbits.:

==== In aquatic environments ====
As biodiesel becomes more widely used, it is important to consider how consumption affects water quality and aquatic ecosystems. Research examining the biodegradability of different biodiesel fuels found that all of the biofuels studied (including Neat Rapeseed oil, Neat Soybean oil, and their modified ester products) were "readily biodegradable" compounds, and had a relatively high biodegradation rate in water. Additionally, the presence of biodiesel can increase the rate of diesel biodegradation via co-metabolism. As the ratio of biodiesel is increased in biodiesel/diesel mixtures, the faster the diesel is degraded. Another study using controlled experimental conditions also showed that fatty acid methyl esters, the primary molecules in biodiesel, degraded much faster than petroleum diesel in sea water.

==== Carbonyl emissions ====
When considering the emissions from fossil fuel and biofuel use, research typically focuses on major pollutants such as hydrocarbons. It is generally recognized that using biodiesel in place of diesel results in a substantial reduction in regulated gas emissions, but there has been a lack of information in research literature about the non-regulated compounds which also play a role in air pollution. One study focused on the emissions of non-criteria carbonyl compounds from the burning of pure diesel and biodiesel blends in heavy-duty diesel engines. The results found that carbonyl emissions of formaldehyde, acetaldehyde, acrolein, acetone, propionaldehyde and butyraldehyde, were higher in biodiesel mixtures than emissions from pure diesel. Biodiesel use results in higher carbonyl emissions but lower total hydrocarbon emissions, which may be better as an alternative fuel source. Other studies have been done which conflict with these results, but comparisons are difficult to make due to various factors that differ between studies (such as types of fuel and engines used). In a paper which compared 12 research articles on carbonyl emissions from biodiesel fuel use, it found that 8 of the papers reported increased carbonyl compound emissions while 4 showed the opposite. This is evidence that there is still much research required on these compounds.

=== Mechanical concerns ===
==== Engine wear ====
Lubricity of fuel plays an important role in wear that occurs in an engine. A diesel engine relies on its fuel to provide lubricity for the metal components that are constantly in contact with each other. Biodiesel is a much better lubricant compared with fossil petroleum diesel due to the presence of esters. Tests have shown that the addition of a small amount of biodiesel to diesel can significantly increase the lubricity of the fuel in short term.

==== Fuel viscosity ====
One of the main concerns regarding biodiesel is its viscosity. The viscosity of diesel is 2.5–3.2 cSt at 40 °C and the viscosity of biodiesel made from soybean oil is between 4.2 and 4.6 cSt The viscosity of diesel must be high enough to provide sufficient lubrication for the engine parts but low enough to flow at operational temperature. High viscosity can plug the fuel filter and injection system in engines. Vegetable oil is composed of lipids with long chains of hydrocarbons, to reduce its viscosity the lipids are broken down into smaller molecules of esters. This is done by converting vegetable oil and animal fats into alkyl esters using transesterification to reduce their viscosity Nevertheless, biodiesel viscosity remains higher than that of diesel, and the engine may not be able to use the fuel at low temperatures due to the slow flow through the fuel filter.

==== Engine performance ====
Biodiesel has higher brake-specific fuel consumption compared to diesel, which means more biodiesel fuel consumption is required for the same torque. However, B20 biodiesel blend has been found to provide maximum increase in thermal efficiency, lowest brake-specific energy consumption, and lower harmful emissions. The engine performance depends on the properties of the fuel, as well as on combustion, injector pressure and many other factors. Since there are various blends of biodiesel, that may account for the contradicting reports as regards engine performance.

==== Exhaust emissions ====
The feedstock used to make the biodiesel alters the fuel's properties by changing the average carbon chain length and number of double bonds present in the fatty acid methyl esters.

==== Low-temperature gelling ====
When biodiesel is cooled below a certain point, some of the molecules aggregate and form crystals. The fuel starts to appear cloudy once the crystals become larger than one quarter of the wavelengths of visible light – this is the cloud point (CP). As the fuel is cooled further these crystals become larger. The lowest temperature at which fuel can pass through a 45 micrometre filter is the cold filter plugging point (CFPP). As biodiesel is cooled further it will gel and then solidify. Within Europe, there are differences in the CFPP requirements between countries. This is reflected in the different national standards of those countries. The temperature at which pure (B100) biodiesel starts to gel varies significantly and depends upon the mix of esters and therefore the feedstock oil used to produce the biodiesel. For example, biodiesel produced from low erucic acid varieties of canola seed (RME) starts to gel at approximately −10 °C (14 °F). Biodiesel produced from beef tallow and palm oil tends to gel at around 16 °C (61 °F) and 13 °C (55 °F) respectively. There are a number of commercially available additives that will significantly lower the pour point and cold filter plugging point of pure biodiesel. Winter operation is also possible by blending biodiesel with other fuel oils including #2 low sulfur diesel fuel and #1 diesel / kerosene.

Another approach to facilitate the use of biodiesel in cold conditions is by employing a second fuel tank for biodiesel in addition to the standard diesel fuel tank. The second fuel tank can be insulated and a heating coil using engine coolant is run through the tank. The fuel tanks can be switched over when the fuel is sufficiently warm. A similar method can be used to operate diesel vehicles using straight vegetable oil.

==== Contamination by water ====
Biodiesel may contain small but problematic quantities of water. Although it is only slightly miscible with water it is hygroscopic. One of the reasons biodiesel can absorb water is the persistence of mono and diglycerides left over from an incomplete reaction. These molecules can act as an emulsifier, allowing water to mix with the biodiesel. In addition, there may be water that is residual to processing or resulting from storage tank condensation. The presence of water is a problem because:

- Water reduces the heat of fuel combustion, causing smoke, harder starting, and reduced power.
- Water causes corrosion of fuel system components (pumps, fuel lines, etc.)
- Microbes in water cause the paper-element filters in the system to rot and fail, causing failure of the fuel pump due to ingestion of large particles.
- Water freezes to form ice crystals that provide sites for nucleation, accelerating gelling of the fuel.
- Water causes pitting in pistons.

Previously, the amount of water contaminating biodiesel has been difficult to measure by taking samples, since water and oil separate. However, it is now possible to measure the water content using water-in-oil sensors.

Water contamination is also a potential problem when using certain chemical catalysts involved in the production process, substantially reducing catalytic efficiency of base (high pH) catalysts such as potassium hydroxide. However, the super-critical methanol production methodology, whereby the transesterification process of oil feedstock and methanol is effectuated under high temperature and pressure, has been shown to be largely unaffected by the presence of water contamination during the production phase.

== Research ==
There was research into finding more suitable crops and improving oil yield. Other sources are possible including human fecal matter, with Ghana building its first "fecal sludge-fed biodiesel plant."

Specially bred mustard varieties can produce reasonably high oil yields and are useful in crop rotation with cereals, and have the added benefit that the meal leftover after the oil has been pressed out can act as a biodegradable pesticide.

The NFESC, with Santa Barbara-based Biodiesel Industries is working to develop biodiesel technologies for the US navy and military, one of the largest diesel fuel users in the world.

A group of Spanish developers working for a company called Ecofasa announced a new biofuel made from trash. The fuel is created from general urban waste which is treated by bacteria to produce fatty acids, which can be used to make biodiesel.

Another approach that does not require the use of chemical for the production involves the use of genetically modified microbes.

=== Algal biodiesel ===
From 1978 to 1996, the U.S. NREL experimented with using algae as a biodiesel source in the "Aquatic Species Program". A self-published article by Michael Briggs, at the UNH Biodiesel Group, offers estimates for the realistic replacement of all vehicular fuel with biodiesel by utilizing algae that have a natural oil content greater than 50%, which Briggs suggests can be grown on algae ponds at wastewater treatment plants. This oil-rich algae can then be extracted from the system and processed into biodiesel, with the dried remainder further reprocessed to create ethanol.

The production of algae to harvest oil for biodiesel has not yet been undertaken on a commercial scale, but feasibility studies have been conducted to arrive at the above yield estimate. In addition to its projected high yield, algaculture — unlike crop-based biofuels — does not entail a decrease in food production, since it requires neither farmland nor fresh water. Many companies are pursuing algae bio-reactors for various purposes, including scaling up biodiesel production to commercial levels. Biodiesel lipids could be extracted from wet algae using a simple and economical reaction in ionic liquids.

=== Pongamia ===
Millettia pinnata, also known as the Pongam Oiltree or Pongamia, is a leguminous, oilseed-bearing tree that has been identified as a candidate for non-edible vegetable oil production.

Pongamia plantations for biodiesel production have a two-fold environmental benefit. The trees both store carbon and produce fuel oil. Pongamia grows on marginal land not fit for food crops and does not require nitrate fertilizers. The oil producing tree has the highest yield of oil producing plant (approximately 40% by weight of the seed is oil) while growing in malnourished soils with high levels of salt. It is becoming a main focus in a number of biodiesel research organizations. The main advantages of Pongamia are a higher recovery and quality of oil than other crops and no direct competition with food crops. However, growth on marginal land can lead to lower oil yields which could cause competition with food crops for better soil.

=== Jatropha ===
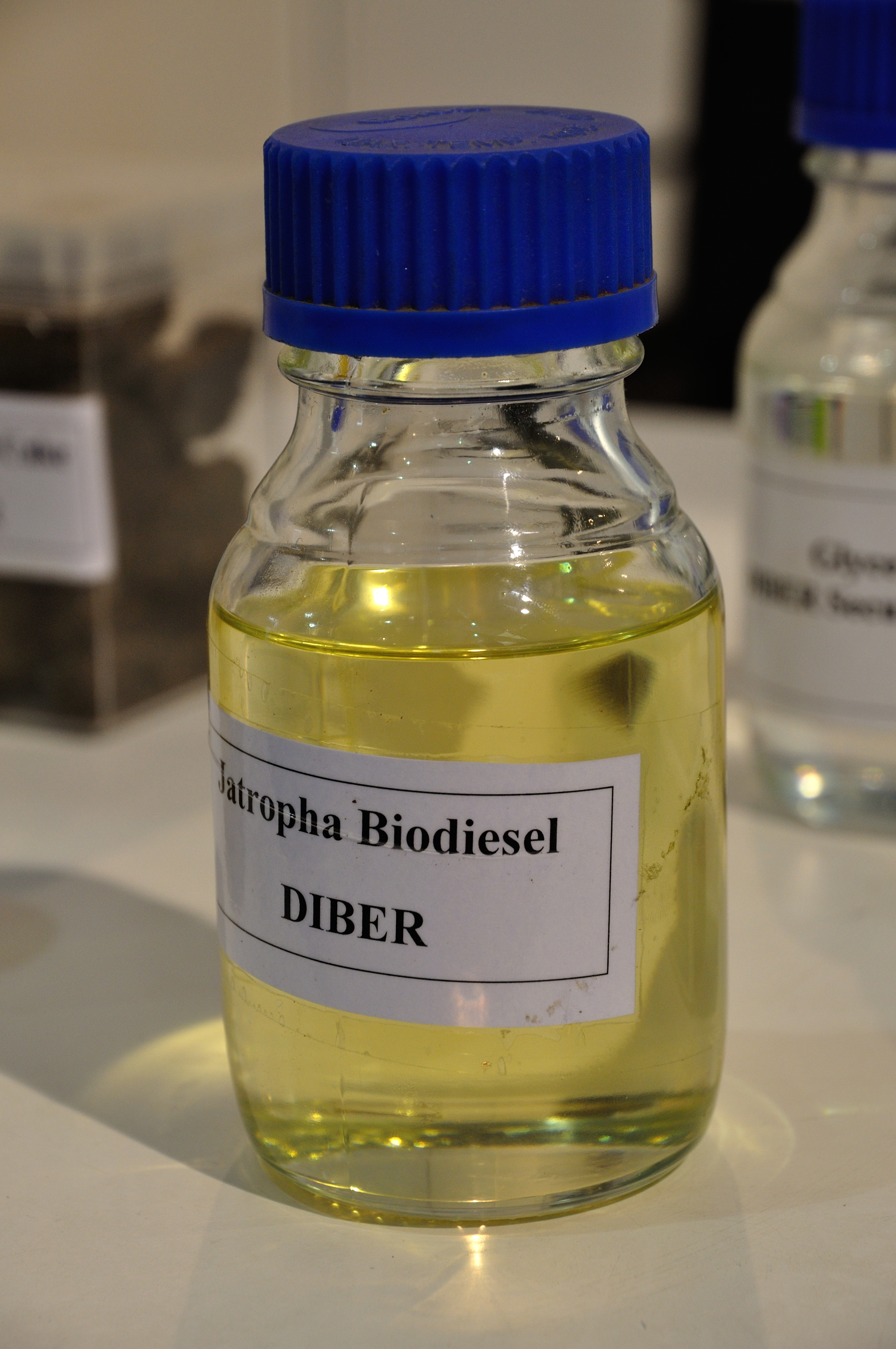
Jatropha Biodiesel from DRDO, India.

Several groups in various sectors are conducting research on Jatropha curcas, a poisonous shrub-like tree that produces seeds considered by many to be a viable source of biodiesel feedstock oil. Much of this research focuses on improving the overall per acre oil yield of Jatropha through advancements in genetics, soil science, and horticultural practices.

SG Biofuels, a San Diego-based Jatropha developer, has used molecular breeding and biotechnology to produce elite hybrid seeds of Jatropha that show significant yield improvements over first generation varieties. SG Biofuels also claims that additional benefits have arisen from such strains, including improved flowering synchronicity, higher resistance to pests and disease, and increased cold weather tolerance.

Plant Research International, a department of the Wageningen University and Research Centre in the Netherlands, maintains an ongoing Jatropha Evaluation Project (JEP) that examines the feasibility of large scale Jatropha cultivation through field and laboratory experiments.

The Center for Sustainable Energy Farming (CfSEF) is a Los Angeles-based non-profit research organization dedicated to Jatropha research in the areas of plant science, agronomy, and horticulture. Successful exploration of these disciplines is projected to increase Jatropha farm production yields by 200–300% in the next ten years.

=== FOG from sewage ===
So-called fats, oils and grease (FOG), recovered from sewage can also be turned into biodiesel.

=== Fungi ===
A group at the Russian Academy of Sciences in Moscow published a paper in 2008, stating that they had isolated large amounts of lipids from single-celled fungi and turned it into biodiesel in an economically efficient manner.

The recent discovery of a variant of the fungus Gliocladium roseum points toward the production of so-called myco-diesel from cellulose. This organism was recently discovered in the rainforests of northern Patagonia and has the unique capability of converting cellulose into medium length hydrocarbons typically found in diesel fuel.

=== Biodiesel from used coffee grounds ===
Researchers at the University of Nevada, Reno, have successfully produced biodiesel from oil derived from used coffee grounds. Their analysis of the used grounds showed a 10% to 15% oil content (by weight). Once the oil was extracted, it underwent conventional processing into biodiesel. It is estimated that finished biodiesel could be produced for about one US dollar per gallon. Further, it was reported that "the technique is not difficult" and that "there is so much coffee around that several hundred million gallons of biodiesel could potentially be made annually." However, even if all the coffee grounds in the world were used to make fuel, the amount produced would be less than 1 percent of the diesel used in the United States annually. "It won't solve the world's energy problem," Dr. Misra said of his work.

=== Biodiesel to hydrogen-cell power ===
A microreactor has been developed to convert biodiesel into hydrogen steam to power fuel cells.

Steam reforming, also known as fossil fuel reforming, is a process which produces hydrogen gas from hydrocarbon fuels, most notably biodiesel due to its efficiency. A microreactor, or reformer, is the processing device in which water vapour reacts with the liquid fuel under high temperature and pressure. Under temperatures ranging from 700 – 1100 °C, a nickel-based catalyst enables the production of carbon monoxide and hydrogen:

Hydrocarbon + H_{2}O ⇌ CO + 3H_{2} (Highly endothermic)

Furthermore, a higher yield of hydrogen gas can be harnessed by further oxidizing carbon monoxide to produce more hydrogen and carbon dioxide:

CO + H_{2}O → CO_{2} + H_{2} (Mildly exothermic)

=== Safflower oil ===
As of 2020, researchers at Australia's CSIRO have been studying safflower oil from a specially-bred variety as an engine lubricant, and researchers at Montana State University's Advanced Fuel Centre in the US have been studying the oil's performance in a large diesel engine, with results described as a "game-changer".

== See also ==
- Civic amenity site; collection point for WVO
- EcoJet concept car
- Food, Conservation, and Energy Act of 2008
- Fuel (film)
- Gasoline gallon equivalent
- Indirect land use change impacts of biofuels
- Issues relating to biofuels
- Low-carbon economy
- MY Ady Gil
- Sustainable biofuel
- Table of biodiesel crop yields
- Tonne of oil equivalent
- United States vs. Imperial Petroleum
- Vegetable oil fuel
- Vegetable oils as alternative energy
