= SG Biofuels =

- Company type: Private
- Industry: Bioenergy
- Founded: 2007
- Headquarters: San Diego, California, U.S.
- Products: Jatropha hybrid seed
- Website: www.sgbiofuels.com

SG Biofuels is a privately held bioenergy crop company, which grows and researches Jatropha curcas for the production of biodiesel, bio jet fuel, and specialty chemicals.

== Company history and overview ==
SG Biofuels (SGB) is a fully integrated bioenergy crop company using molecular breeding and biotechnology to develop and produce elite hybrid seeds of Jatropha as a low-cost feedstock for biodiesel, bio jet fuel, and specialty chemicals.

SG Biofuels was founded in 2007 and is based in San Diego, California.

The company was officially introduced to the public at the 2009 National Biodiesel Conference and Expo in San Francisco, California.

In September 2010, SG Biofuels secured a series A investment of $9.4 million. The funding was led by two privately held companies involved in the development of renewable energy, chemicals and biotechnology: Flint Hills Resources, a subsidiary of Koch Industries, and Life Technologies.

== Jatropha cultivation, research and SGB history ==
SG Biofuels grows Jatropha in greenhouses and on plantations in Latin and Central America for sustainable biofuel production and researches methods with which to optimize the Jatropha seeds and growing processes. Jatropha has been growing successfully in tropical and subtropical locations for many years and has been cited as one of the best candidates for biodiesel production because of its high oil content—30 to 40 percent.

The company's research focuses on the domestication and genetic improvement of Jatropha. Areas of focus include increasing oil content per seed, increasing number of seeds per plant, improving flowering synchronicity, and improving pest and disease resistance. The company also researches strains that can sustain colder temperatures for growth in the U.S.

The company's Jatropha Research and Development Center has the world's largest and most diverse collection of Jatropha genetic material. The company's website states that its germplasm library holds over 12,000 unique Jatropha genotypes. Preliminary molecular marker studies indicate that SG Biofuels' Jatropha germplasm collection exhibits on the order of 5 times the genetic diversity observed in a collection of Jatropha from India, Africa, and Asia.

In March 2010, SG Biofuels launched its first JMax100 cultivar, a proprietary cultivar of Jatropha optimized for growing conditions in Guatemala with yields averaging approximately 100 percent greater than existing varieties.

In August 2010, SG Biofuels and Life Technologies announced that they had completed the genome sequencing of Jatropha.

In August 2011, SG Biofuels (SGB) initiated a program with Bharat Renewable Energy Ltd (BREL), a joint-venture of Bharat Petroleum, India’s second largest petroleum company, to develop and deploy elite hybrids of Jatropha for the production of biodiesel in India.

In September 2011, SGB teamed with JETBIO, leader of a multi-stakeholder initiative including Airbus, the Inter-American Development Bank, Bioventures Brasil, Rio Pardo Bioenergia, Air BP, and TAM Airlines, to accelerate the production of crude jatropha oil as a source for aviation bio jet fuel in Brazil.

In October 2013, SG Biofuels sought an Inter-American Development Bank loan for a jatropha oil project in Guatemala.
