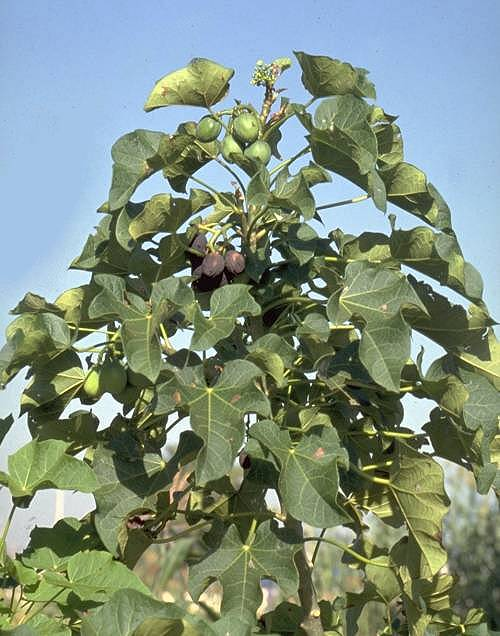

Conservation status
- Least Concern (IUCN 3.1)

Scientific classification
- Kingdom: Plantae
- Clade: Tracheophytes
- Clade: Angiosperms
- Clade: Eudicots
- Clade: Rosids
- Order: Malpighiales
- Family: Euphorbiaceae
- Genus: Jatropha
- Species: J. curcas

Binomial name
- Jatropha curcas L.

= Jatropha curcas =

Species of plant

Jatropha curcas is a species of flowering plant in the spurge family, Euphorbiaceae, that is native to the American tropics: Mexico, the Caribbean and Central and South America. It has been spread to tropical and subtropical regions around the world, becoming naturalized or invasive in many areas. The specific epithet, "curcas", was first used by Portuguese physician and naturalist Garcia de Orta more than 400 years ago. Common names in English include physic nut, Barbados nut, poison nut, bubble bush or purging nut. In parts of Africa and areas in Asia such as India it is often known as "castor oil plant" or "hedge castor oil plant", but it is not the same as the castor oil plant, Ricinus communis.

Jatropha curcas is a semi-evergreen shrub or small tree, reaching a height of 6 metres (20 feet) or more. It is resistant to a high degree of aridity, allowing it to grow in deserts. It contains phorbol esters, which are considered toxic. However, edible (non-toxic) varieties native to Mexico also exist, known by the local population as piñón manso, xuta, chutacurcaste, among others. J. curcas also contains compounds such as trypsin inhibitors, phytate, saponins and a type of lectin known as curcin.

The seeds contain 27–40% oil (average: 34.4%) that can be processed to produce a high-quality biodiesel fuel, usable in a standard diesel engine. The oil is a strong laxative. Edible (non-toxic) varieties, as those developed by selection by ethnic Mexican natives in Veracruz, can be used for animal feed and food.

== Description ==
- Leaves: The leaves have significant variability in their morphology. In general, the leaves are green to pale green, alternate to subopposite, and three- to five-lobed with a spiral phyllotaxis.
- Flowers: male and female flowers are produced on the same inflorescence, averaging 20 male flowers to each female flower, or 10 male flowers to each female flower. The inflorescence can be formed in the leaf axil. Plants occasionally present hermaphroditic flowers.
- Fruits : fruits are produced in winter, or there may be several crops during the year if soil moisture is good and temperatures are sufficiently high. Most fruit production is concentrated from midsummer to late fall with variations in production peaks where some plants have two or three harvests and some produce continuously through the season.
- Seeds: the seeds are mature when the capsule changes from green to yellow. The seeds contain around 20% saturated fatty acids and 80% unsaturated fatty acids, and they yield 25–40% oil by weight. In addition, the seeds contain other chemical compounds, such as saccharose, raffinose, stachyose, glucose, fructose, galactose, and protein. The oil is largely made up of oleic and linoleic acids. Furthermore, the plant also contains curcasin, arachidic, myristic, palmitic, and stearic acids and curcin.
- Genome: the whole genome was sequenced by Kazusa DNA Research Institute, Chiba Japan in October 2010.

== Propagation ==
Jatropha curcas can easily be propagated by both seed or cuttings. Some people recommend propagation by seed for establishment of long-lived plantations. When jatropha plants develop from cuttings, they produce many branches but yield fewer seeds and do not have enough time to develop their taproot, which makes them sensitive to wind erosion. The seeds exhibit orthodox storage behaviour, that is, they can be dried for long-term storage. Propagation through seed (sexual propagation) leads to a lot of genetic variability in terms of growth, biomass, seed yield and oil content. Clonal techniques can help in overcoming these problems. Vegetative propagation has been achieved by stem cuttings, grafting, budding as well as by air layering techniques. Cuttings should be taken preferably from juvenile plants and treated with 200 micro gram per litre of IBA (rooting hormone) to ensure the highest level of rooting in stem cuttings. Cuttings strike root easily stuck in the ground without use of hormones.

== Cultivation ==
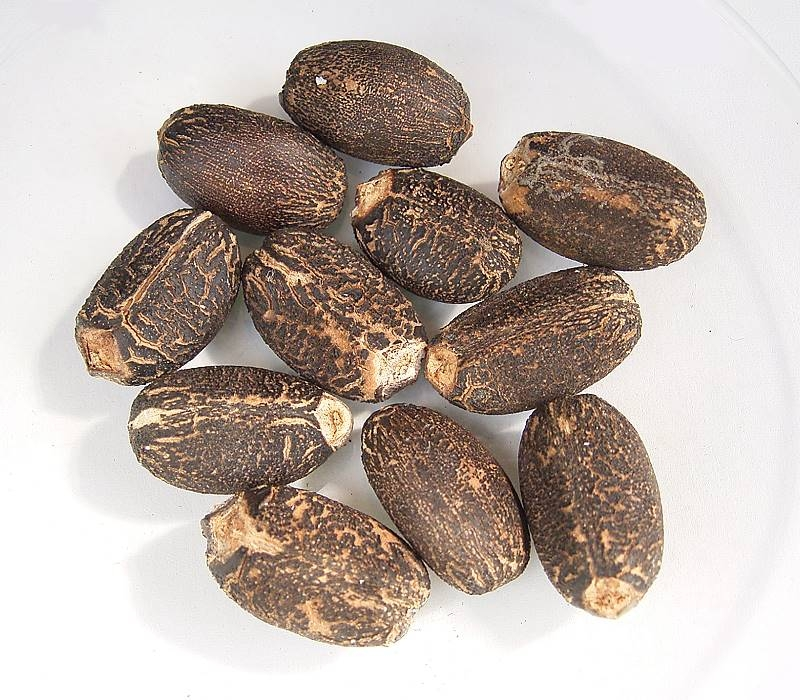
Jatropha curcas seeds

Cultivation is uncomplicated. Jatropha curcas grows in tropical and subtropical regions. The plant can grow in wastelands and grows on almost any terrain, even on gravelly, sandy and saline soils. It can thrive in poor and stony soils, although new research suggests that the plant's ability to adapt to these poor soils is not as extensive as had been previously stated. Complete germination is achieved within 9 days. Adding manure during the germination has negative effects during that phase, but is favorable if applied after germination is achieved. It can be propagated by cuttings, which yields faster results than multiplication by seeds.

The flowers only develop terminally (at the end of a stem), so a good ramification (plants presenting many branches) produces the greatest amount of fruits. The plants are self-compatible. Another productivity factor is the ratio between female and male flowers within an inflorescence, more female flowers mean more fruits. Jatropha curcas thrives on a mere 250 mm (10 in) of rain a year, and only during its first two years does it need to be watered in the closing days of the dry season. Ploughing and planting are not needed regularly, as this shrub has a life expectancy of approximately forty years. The use of pesticides is not necessary, due to the pesticidal and fungicidal properties of the plant. It is used in rural Bengal for dhobi itch (a common fungal infection of the skin).

While Jatropha curcas starts yielding from 9–12 months time, the best yields are obtained only after 2–3 years time. The seed production is around 3.5 tons per hectare (seed production ranges from about 0.4 t/ha in the first year to over 5 t/ha after 3 years). If planted in hedges, the reported productivity of Jatropha is from 0.8 to 1.0 kg of seed per meter of live fence.

== Gallery ==
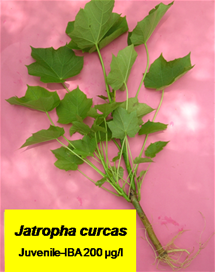
propagation of Jatropha curcas by stem cutting

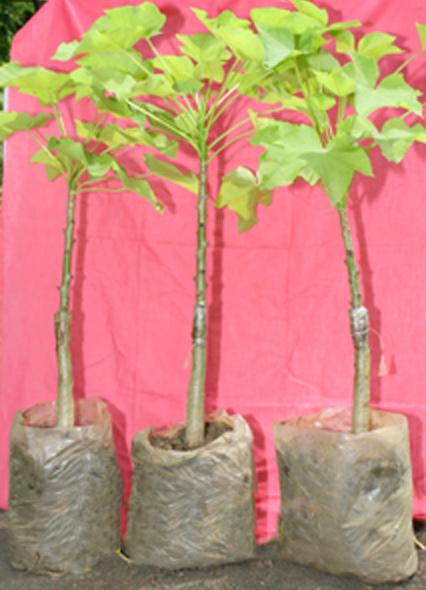
propagation of Jatropha curcas by grafting

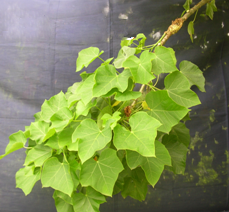
propagation of Jatropha curcas by Air layering

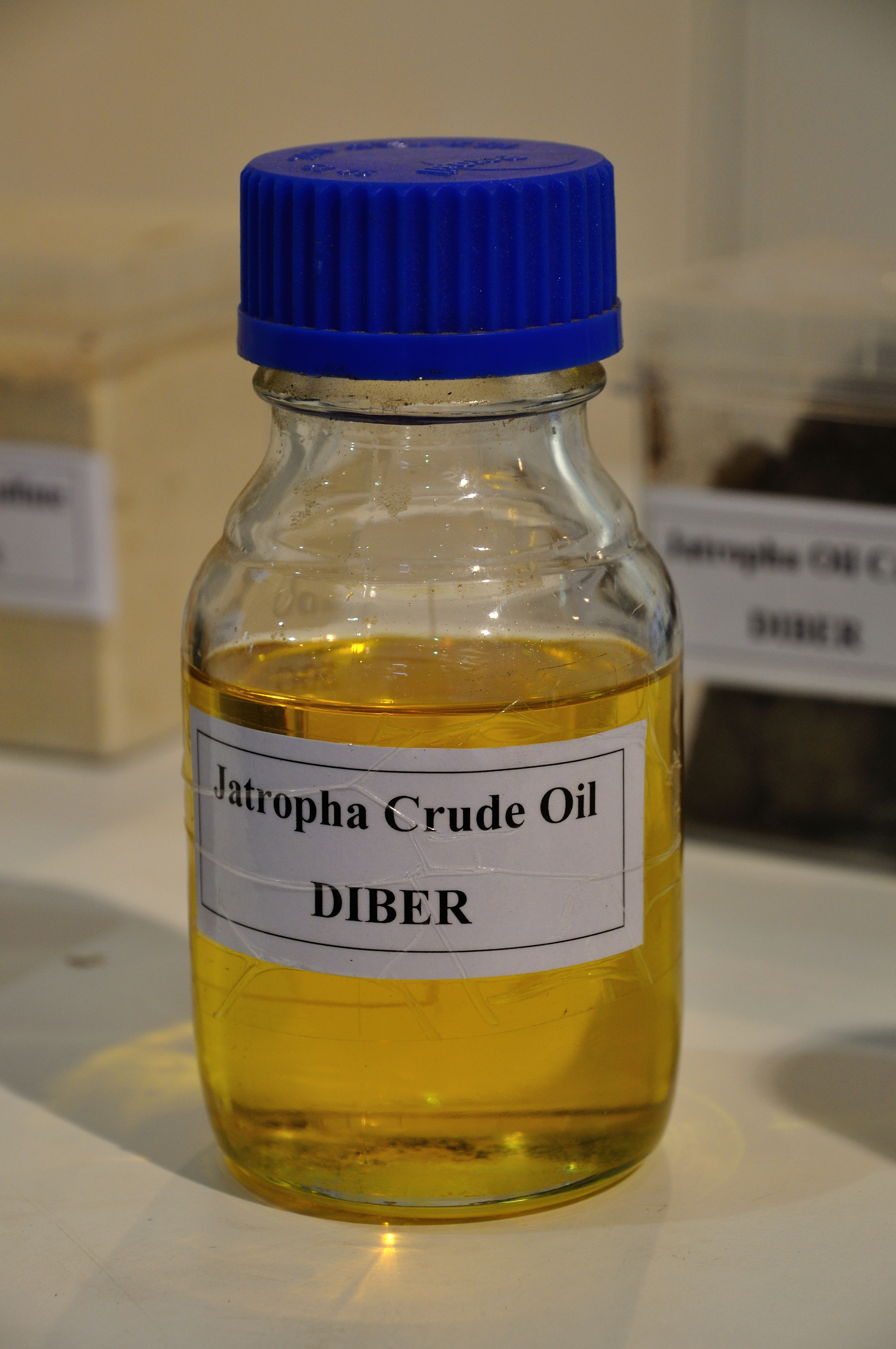
Jatropha Crude Oil.

== Processing ==
Seed extraction and processing generally needs specialized facilities.

Oil content varies from 28% to 30% and 80% extraction, one hectare of plantation will give 400 to 600 litres of oil if the soil is average.

The oily seeds are processed into oil, which may be used directly ("Straight Vegetable Oil") to fuel combustion engines or may be subjected to transesterification to produce biodiesel. Jatropha oil is not suitable for human consumption, as it induces strong vomiting and diarrhea.

== Biofuel ==
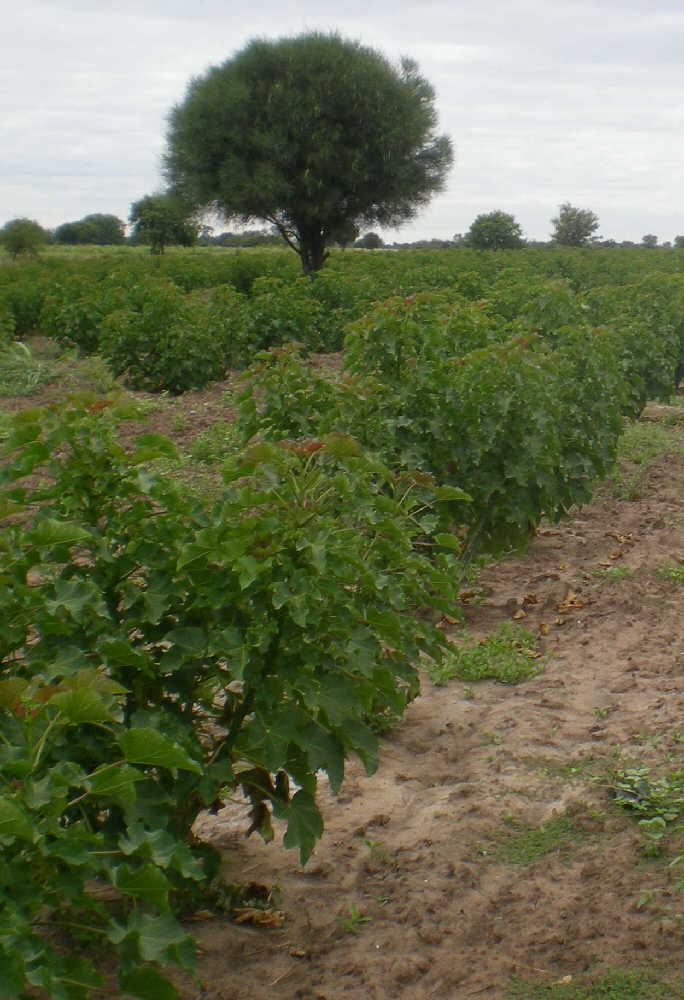
Jatropha plantation in the dry center/west of the Paraguay Chaco

When jatropha seeds are crushed, the resulting jatropha oil can be processed to produce a high-quality biofuel or biodiesel that can be used in a standard diesel car or further processed into jet fuel, while the residue (press cake) can also be used as biomass feedstock to power electricity plants, or used as fertilizer (it contains nitrogen, phosphorus and potassium). The cake can also be used as feed in digesters and gasifiers to produce biogas.

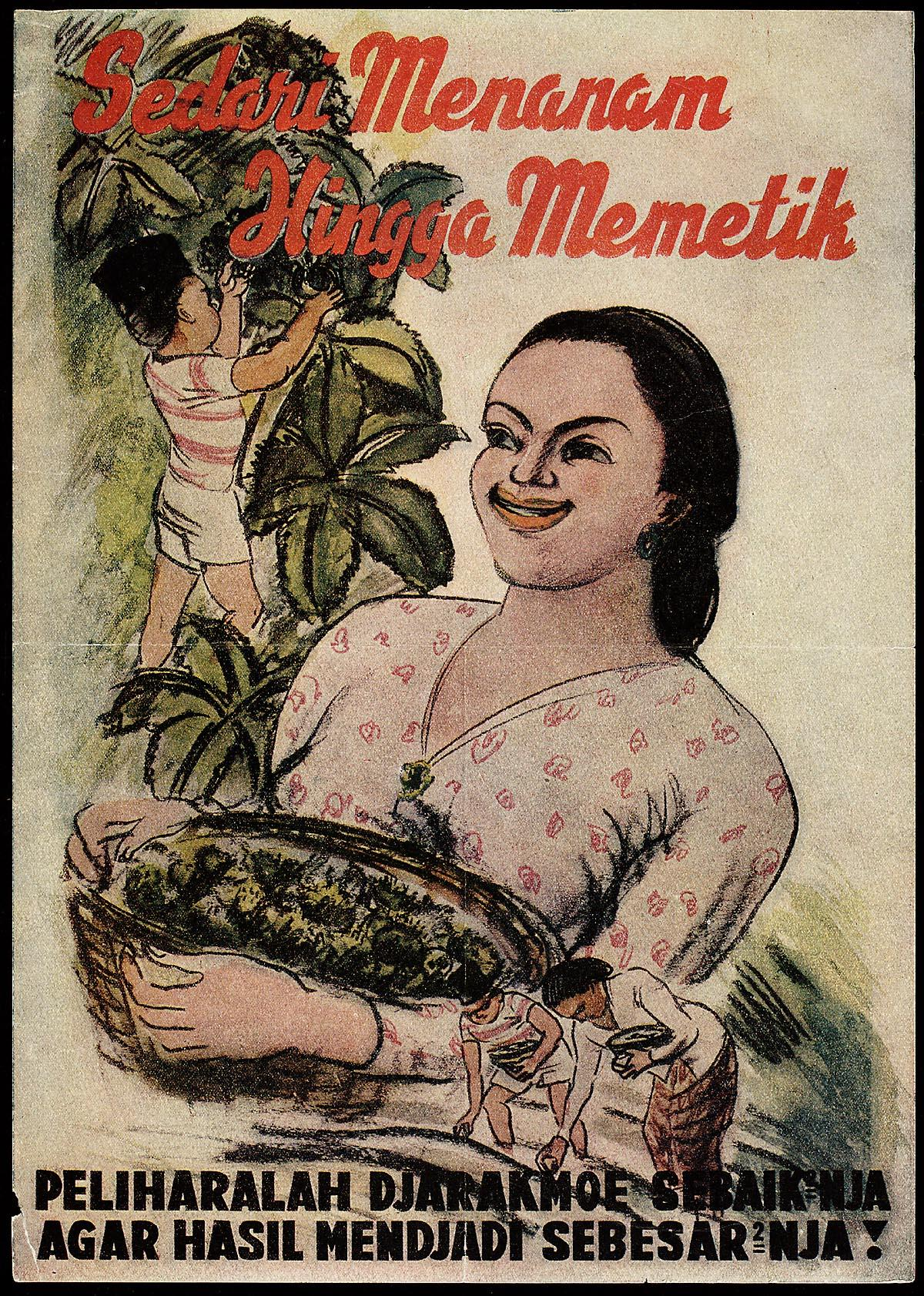
"From planting to picking. Treat your jatropha plant as well as possible to make the yield as large as possible!" (A reference to the compulsory planting of jatropha in Indonesia for the production of oil as machinery lubricant and fuel for the Japanese WWII war effort.)

There are several forms of biofuel, often manufactured using sedimentation, centrifugation, and filtration. The fats and oils are turned into esters while separating the glycerin. At the end of the process, the glycerin settles and the biofuel floats. The process through which the glycerin is separated from the biodiesel is known as transesterification. Glycerin is another by-product from Jatropha oil processing that can add value to the crop. Transesterification is a simple chemical reaction that neutralizes the free fatty acids present in any fatty substances in Jatropha. A chemical exchange takes place between the alkoxy groups of an ester compound by an alcohol. Usually, methanol and ethanol are used for the purpose. The reaction occurs in the presence of a catalyst, usually sodium hydroxide (NaOH) or caustic soda and potassium hydroxide (KOH), which forms fatty esters (e.g., methyl or ethyl esters), commonly known as biodiesel. It takes approximately 10% of methyl alcohol by weight of the fatty substance to start the transesterification process.

Estimates of Jatropha seed yield vary widely, due to a lack of research data, the genetic diversity of the crop, the range of environments in which it is grown, and Jatropha's perennial life cycle. Seed yields under cultivation can range from 1,500 to 2,000 kilograms per hectare, corresponding to extractable oil yields of 540 to 680 litres per hectare (58 to 73 gallons per acre). In 2009 Time magazine cited the potential for as much as 1,600 gallons of diesel fuel per acre per year. The plant may yield more than four times as much fuel per hectare as soybean, and more than ten times that of maize (corn), but at the same time it requires five times as much water per unit of energy produced as does corn (see below). A hectare of jatropha has been claimed to produce 1,892 litres of fuel. However, as it has not yet been domesticated or improved by plant breeders, yields are variable.

Jatropha can also be intercropped with other cash crops such as coffee, sugar, fruits and vegetables.

However, despite its abundance and use as an oil and reclamation plant, none of the Jatropha species has been properly domesticated and, as a result, its productivity is variable, and the long-term impact of its large-scale use on soil quality and the environment is unknown.

In 2008 researchers at Daimler Chrysler Research explored the use of jatropha oil for automotive use, concluding that although jatropha oil as fuel "has not yet reached optimal quality, ... it already fulfills the EU norm for biodiesel quality". Archer Daniels Midland Company, Bayer CropScience and Daimler AG have a joint project to develop jatropha as a biofuel.

=== Jet fuel ===
Aviation fuels may be more widely replaced by biofuels such as jatropha oil than fuels for other forms of transportation. There are fewer planes than cars or trucks and far fewer jet fueling stations to convert than gas stations. To fulfil the yearly demand for aviation fuel, based on demand in 2008 (fuel use has since grown), an area of farmland twice the size of France would need to be planted with jatropha, based on average yields of mature plantations on reasonably good, irrigated land.

On December 30, 2008, Air New Zealand flew the first successful test flight from Auckland with a Boeing 747 running one of its four Rolls-Royce engines on a 50:50 blend of jatropha oil and jet A-1 fuel. In the same press release, Air New Zealand announced plans to use the new fuel for 10% of its needs by 2013. At the time of this test, jatropha oil was much cheaper than crude oil, costing an estimated $43 a barrel or about one-third of the June 4, 2008 closing price of $122.30 for a barrel of crude oil.

On January 7, 2009 Continental Airlines successfully completed a test flight from Houston, Texas using a 50/50 mixture of algae/jatropha-oil-derived biofuel and Jet A in one of the two CFM56 engines of a Boeing 737-800 Next Generation jet. The two-hour test flight could mark another promising step for the airline industry to find cheaper and more environmentally friendly alternatives to fossil fuel.

On April 1, 2011 Interjet completed the first Mexican aviation biofuels test flight on an Airbus A320. The fuel was a 70:30 traditional jet fuel biojet blend produced from Jatropha oil provided by three Mexican producers, Global Energías Renovables (a wholly owned subsidiary of U.S.-based Global Clean Energy Holdings), Bencafser S.A. and Energy JH S.A. Honeywell's UOP processed the oil into Bio-SPK (Synthetic Paraffinic Kerosene). Global Energías Renovables operates the largest Jatropha farm in the Americas.

On October 28, 2011 Air China completed the first successful demonstration flight by a Chinese airline that used jatropha-based biofuel. The mixture was a 50:50 mix of conventional jet fuel blended with jatropha oil from China National Petroleum Corp. The 747-400 powered one of its four engines on the fuel mixture during the 1-hour flight around Beijing airport.

On August 27, 2018 SpiceJet completed the first successful test flight by an Indian airline which used jatropha based biofuel. The ratio of conventional jet fuel to jatropha oil was 25:75.

=== Carbon dioxide sequestration ===
According to a 2013 study published by the European Geosciences Union, the jatropha tree may have applications in the absorption of carbon dioxide, whose sequestration is important in combating climate change. This small tree is very resistant to aridity so it can be planted in hot and dry land in soil unsuitable for food production. The plant does need water to grow though, so coastal areas where desalinated seawater can be made available are ideal.

=== Use in developing world ===
Currently the oil from Jatropha curcas seeds is used for making biodiesel fuel in Philippines, Pakistan and in Brazil, where it grows naturally and in plantations in the southeast, north, and northeast of Brazil. In the Gran Chaco of Paraguay, where a native variety (Jatropha matacensis) also grows, studies have shown the suitability of Jatropha cultivation and agro producers are starting to consider planting in the region. In Africa, cultivation of jatropha is being promoted and it is grown successfully in countries such as Mali.

==== India ====
Jatropha oil is being promoted as an easily grown biofuel crop in hundreds of projects throughout India. Large plantings and nurseries have been undertaken in India by many research institutions, and by women's self-help groups who use a system of microcredit to ease poverty among semiliterate Indian women. The railway line between Mumbai and Delhi is planted with jatropha and the train itself runs on 15–20% biodiesel.

==== Myanmar ====
In 2005, Myanmar announced an initiative to harvest jatropha oil with the goal of being a 100% bio-diesel fueled country in response to rising costs of energy. 200,000 to 400,000 hectares were planted with up to 3 million hectares in planned expansion. In 2006, the State Peace and Development Council decreed that every farmer with landholdings of one acre plant 200 physic seed nuts around the plot's perimeter. Farmers were forced to purchase jatropha seeds and plant them for later harvest, non-compliance was punishable by imprisonment. The military dictatorship also seized some landholdings and used forced labor to farm the plant. The initiative lacked the critical infrastructure to support it and exacerbated food insecurity issues by displacing land dedicated to addressing food availability. No processing plant was built and Myanmar never had the capacity to process the nuts. In May 2008, the country was unable to mill and process biofuel before Cyclone Nargis turned the plantations into fields of rot.

In 2017, the potential for the plant grown in Myanmar to be used as an anti-viral were investigated after its extracts showed evidence of inhibiting H1N1 variant of the influenza A virus. It was also explored for its cytotoxicity for cancer treatment and tumor promotion as a fertilizer.

=== Controversies ===
As of 2011 scepticism about the "miracle" properties of Jatropha has been voiced. For example: "The idea that jatropha can be grown on marginal land is a red herring", according to Harry Stourton, former business development director of UK-based Sun Biofuels, which attempted to cultivate Jatropha in Mozambique and Tanzania. "It does grow on marginal land, but if you use marginal land you'll get marginal yields," he said. Sun Biofuels, after failing to adequately compensate local farmers for the land acquired for their plantation in Tanzania, pay workers severance, or deliver promised supplies to local villagers, went bankrupt later in 2011, the villager farmland being sold to an offshore investment fund.

An August 2010 article warned about the actual utility and potential dangers of reliance on Jatropha in Kenya. Major concerns included its invasiveness, which could disrupt local biodiversity, as well as damage to water catchment areas.

Jatropha curcas is lauded as being sustainable, and that its production would not compete with food production, but the jatropha plant needs water like every other crop to grow. This could create competition for water between the jatropha and other edible food crops. In fact, jatropha requires five times more water per unit of energy than sugarcane and corn.

== Food for human consumption ==
Xuta, chuta, aishte or piñón manso (among others) are some of the names given in Mexico to edible non-toxic Jatropha curcas. It is grown in house gardens or other small areas. Although it is known as a toxic plant due to the presence of diterpenes named phorbol esters, the existence of edible non-toxic J. curcas without phorbol esters content has been demonstrated. It is also similarly reported that Jatropha seeds are edible once the embryo has been removed. The process for analysis of phorbol ester contents in J. curcas is done through high-performance liquid chromatography (HPLC).

Xuta is traditionally prepared for local celebrations or popular parties. The kernels are roasted and eaten as a snack or roasted and ground to prepare different dishes, such as tamales, soups and sauces like "pipian". The seeds in the zone around Misantla, Veracruz are very appreciated by the population as food once they have been boiled and roasted.

Root ashes are used as a salt substitute. HCN and rotenone are present.

In 2023, 10 children in the Philippines fell ill from consuming J. curcas seeds after watching a social media video that suggested they were safe to eat.

== Other uses ==
- Flowers

The species is listed as a honey plant. Hydrogen cyanide is present.

- Nuts

Can be construed for home cooking fuel in briquette form replacing charcoalized timber as in Haiti.
They can be burned like candlenuts when strung on grass. HCN is present.
Used as a contraceptive in South Sudan.

- Seeds

Interest exists in producing animal feed from the bio-waste once the oil is expressed, as in the case with Haiti, where Jatropha curcas grows prolifically and animal feed is in very short supply.
Similarly, Metsiyen in the Haitian culture dates back as a medicinal crop—thus the name "metsiyen"/"medsiyen". Some suggest it "calms the stomach".
Also used as a contraceptive in South Sudan.
The oil has been used for illumination, soap, candles, the adulteration of olive oil, and making Turkey red oil. Turkey red oil, also called sulphonated (or sulfated) castor oil, is the only oil that completely disperses in water. It is made by adding sulfuric acid to pure Jatropha oil. It was the first synthetic detergent after ordinary soap, as this allows easy use for making bath oil products. It is used in formulating lubricants, softeners, and dyeing assistants.

- Bark

Used as a fish poison. HCN is present. Igbinosa and colleagues (2009) demonstrated potential broad spectrum antimicrobial activity of J. curcas bark extract.

- Latex

Strongly inhibits the watermelon mosaic virus.

- Leaves

Leaf sap can be used to blow bubbles.

- Sap

It stains linen. Sometimes used for marking.

- Shrub

Used for erosion control.

== See also ==
- Copaifera langsdorffii
- Energy crop
- Jatropha biodiesel in India
- Non food crop
- Tanganyika groundnut scheme
