= Renewable Identification Number =

A Renewable Identification Number (or RIN) is a serial number assigned to a batch of biofuel for the purpose of tracking its production, use, and trading as required by the United States Environmental Protection Agency's Renewable Fuel Standard (RFS) implemented according to the Energy Policy Act of 2005 and the Energy Independence and Security Act of 2007.

== RIN components ==
As defined in the regulation: Under RFS2, each batch-RIN generated will continue to uniquely identify not only a specific batch of renewable fuel, but also every gallon-RIN assigned to that batch. Thus the RIN will continue to be defined as follows:

RIN: KYYYYCCCCFFFFFBBBBBRRDSSSSSSSSEEEEEEEE

Where:

- K = Code distinguishing assigned RINs from separated RINs
- YYYY = Calendar year of production or import
- CCCC = Company ID
- FFFFF = Facility ID
- BBBBB = Batch number
- RR = Code identifying the Equivalence Value
- D = Code identifying the renewable fuel category
- SSSSSSSS = Start of RIN block
- EEEEEEEE = End of RIN block

== Authorizing legislation ==
Under the Energy Policy Act of 2005, the EPA is authorized to set annual quotas dictating what percentage of the total amount of motor fuels consumed in the US must be represented by biofuel blended into fossil fuels. Companies that refine, import or blend fossil fuels are obligated to meet certain individual RFS quotas based on the volume of fuel they introduce into the market. By fulfilling these requirements, the EPA projects that the industry will collectively satisfy the overall national quota they set. To ensure compliance, obligated parties are periodically required to demonstrate they have met their RFS quota by submitting a certain amount of RINs to the EPA. Because each of these RINs represent an amount of biofuel that has been blended into fossil fuels, the RINs submitted to the EPA by obligated parties are a quantitative representation of the amount of biofuel that has been blended into the fossil fuels used in America.

== Registration and trading ==
Anyone who owns RINs must register with the EPA on an annual basis and obey mandated record-keeping requirements. RINs are only granted if the registered fuel was made in accordance with EISA rules. These regulations are enforced against both domestic and foreign producers. All RINs are reported to the EPA after creation.

=== Fraud ===
Renewable Identification Numbers can be sold and traded separately from the biofuels that created them. This has given rise to instances of "RIN fraud", where improperly created RINs have been sold without any manufacture of corresponding biofuels.
