= Renewable Fuel Standard (United States) =

American federal transportation program

The Renewable Fuel Standard (RFS) is an American federal program that requires transportation fuel sold in the United States to contain a minimum volume of renewable fuels. It originated with the Energy Policy Act of 2005 and was expanded and extended by the Energy Independence and Security Act of 2007. Research published by the Government Accountability Office in November 2016 found the program unlikely to meet its goal of reducing greenhouse gas emissions due to limited existing and expected future production of advanced biofuels.

== History ==
The RFS requires renewable fuel to be blended into transportation fuel in increasing amounts each year, escalating to 36 billion gallons by 2022. Each renewable fuel category in the RFS must emit lower levels of greenhouse gases relative to the petroleum fuel it replaces.

The first RFS, usually referred to as RFS1, required that 4 billion gallons of biofuel be used in 2006. This requirement was scheduled to rise to 7.5 billion gallons in 2012. These requirements were passed as part of the Energy Policy Act of 2005. The Energy Independence and Security Act (EISA) of 2007 changed and broadened these rules. EISA was signed into law by President George W. Bush and the bill was overwhelmingly supported by members of congress from both parties.

The changes required by the 2007 legislation are usually referred to as RFS2. RFS2 required the use of 9 billion gallons in 2008 and scheduled a requirement for 36 billion gallons in 2022. The quota for 2022 was to allow no more than a maximum of 15 billion gallons from corn starch ethanol and a minimum of 16 billion gallons from cellulosic biofuels.

In reaction to the implementation of the RFS, passage of EISA, and other measures to support ethanol, the Organization of Petroleum Exporting Countries (OPEC) expressed alarm. In 2007, OPEC's secretary general, Abdalla El-Badri, said that increased use of biofuels by the United States could cause OPEC to decrease production. Other OPEC leaders openly worried about "security of demand."

== Enforcement and administration ==
The United States Environmental Protection Agency (EPA) administers the RFS with volume requirements for several categories of renewable fuels. The EPA issued detailed regulations for implementing RFS1 in April 2007. These regulations established rules for fuel suppliers, created the Renewable Identification Numbers (RIN) system for compliance and trading credits, and rules for waivers. The EPA calculates a blending standard for each year based on estimates of gasoline usage created by the Department of Energy's Energy Information Administration. Separate quotas and blending requirements are determined for cellulosic biofuels, biomass-based diesel, advanced biofuels, and total renewable fuel. Exemptions for small producers are considered when calculating blending ratios. Advanced biofuels are required to meet stricter air pollution requirements than regular corn-based ethanol.

The individual obligations for producers are called Renewable Volume Obligations (RVO). An RVO is determined by multiplying the output of the producer by the EPA's announced blending ratios for each of the four standards described above. The producer has to show compliance through the RIN system. It can purchase RINs to makeup for any shortfall in production. Surplus RINs can be sold. This is done through the EPA's Moderated Transaction System. The EPA established an RVO of 18.11 billion gallons total for 2016.

On May 29, 2015, the EPA set an RVO lower than the benchmarks established by Congress. This generated criticism from all sides of the issue. The EPA was also blamed for missing legal deadlines to revise the RVO targets. Some say this introduced market uncertainty, harming both consumers and producers. The EPA made this announcement in May to meet a June 1, 2015 deadline established by the settlement to a lawsuit brought by fossil fuel and chemical trade associations. The EPA defended the targets calling them "ambitious but responsible" and arguing that "Biofuels remain an important part of the overall strategy to enhance energy security and address climate change." The EPA announcement called for a 27-percent increase in the use of advanced biofuels from 2014 to 2016. Most gasoline used in the United States is blended to E10, which contains only 10% ethanol. The May 2015 rule changes thus created modest incentives to make greater use of E85 and E15, which contain more ethanol.

Many in the biofuel industry argue that the EPA abused its waiver authority by setting RVOs lower than the statutory minimums. They say Congress clearly intended for the law to apply according to supply that could be available rather than demand. They contend that the EPA has conflated the two. Under EISA, the statutory standard for 2017 is 24 billion gallons. On May 19, 2016, the EPA proposed an RVO of 18.8 billion gallons of biofuel for 2017. This was up from 18.4 billion gallons in 2016. Ethanol supporters and oil companies alike criticized this target. On July 28, 2017, the District of Columbia Court of Appeals rejected the EPA's 2015 waivers.

On June 22, 2016, the EPA announced that it was considering changes to the enforcement of blending standards. The agency has received petitions calling for compliance to be shifted away from refiners to blenders or "the entity that holds title to the gasoline or diesel fuel, immediately prior to the sale from the bulk transfer/terminal system … to a wholesaler, retailer or ultimate consumer."

After 2022, the EPA has wide discretion to set RVOs in accordance with the goals outlined under EISA. According to the EISA, "the applicable volumes of each fuel specified in the tables in clause (i) for calendar years after the calendar years specified in the tables shall be determined by the Administrator, in coordination with the Secretary of Energy and the Secretary of Agriculture, based on a review of the implementation of the program during calendar years specified in the tables..."

=== Feedstock ===
EISA defined "renewable fuel" as being made from biomass but also restricted the type of land on which permissible feedstock could be grown. Land put into cultivation after December 13, 2007 was excluded.

=== Pollution standards ===
EISA defined air pollution standards that require various levels of greenhouse gas reductions according to the type of biofuel used and the fuel being displaced. Cellulosic biofuels must have emissions that are at least a 60 percent reduction relative to gasoline or diesel fuel that would be used in its place. Biomass and sugarcane ethanol must have 50 percent reductions. Research at Argonne National Laboratory sponsored by the Department of Energy demonstrated that, on average, corn ethanol reduces carbon dioxide emissions by 34 percent over gasoline.

=== "Blend wall" ===
The amount of ethanol used in the United States is capped by a limit of 10% ethanol content for most gasoline and diesel sales. This limit is often referred to as the "blend wall." Raising the blend wall to 15% could help meet the statutory minimums set out in EISA. Increasing ethanol content in gasoline beyond 15% would require modifications to the fuel systems of a conventional engine. The amount of ethanol used in the United States is also limited by the number of Flex Fuel vehicles available which are capable of operating on ethanol blends as high as 85% (E85) and the relative pricing of E85 as compared to regular gasoline (E10).

Other alternative fuels may have higher functional "blend walls". Biobutanol may be legally blended up to 16%, operating as an E10 equivalent, though it is possible to operate at as high as 20% butanol without engine modification.

== Effects ==
=== Food prices ===
According to research sponsored by the United States government, the World Bank, and other organizations, there is no clear link between the RFS and higher food prices. Ethanol critics contend that RFS requirements crowd out production that would go to feed livestock.

The 2008 financial crisis illustrated corn ethanol's limited impact on corn prices, which fell 50% from their July 2008 high by October 2008, in tandem with other primary resources, including oil, while corn ethanol production continued unabated. "Analysts, including some in the ethanol sector, say ethanol demand adds about 75 cents to $1.00 per bushel to the price of corn, as a rule of thumb. Other analysts say it adds around 20 percent, or just under 80 cents per bushel at current prices. Those estimates hint that $4 per bushel corn might be priced at only $3 without demand for ethanol fuel."

University of Wisconsin researchers determined the RFS caused corn prices to be 30% higher and other crops 20% higher.

=== Land use and emissions ===
A 2021 study from the University of Wisconsin found that the RFS increased corn cultivation by 8.7% and total cropland by 2.4% through 2016. This resulted in 3 to 8% more fertilizer use and 3 to 5% more release of water degradents. This land-use change resulted in corn ethanol's carbon intensity being no lower than gasoline's and up to 24% higher.

=== Fuel prices and consumption ===
Ethanol costs a few cents less per gallon than gasoline, but it delivers two-thirds as much energy. A 30 mpg vehicle would get 20 mpg if fueled entirely with ethanol. Consequently, incorporation of ethanol into gasoline has a slight lowering effect on the cost of fuel, but it significantly raises the cost of driving.

== Litigation ==
A question of statutory interpretation of the Standard was raised at the Supreme Court in a 2021 case, HollyFrontier Cheyenne Refining, LLC v. Renewable Fuels Assn. Under the Standards, smaller refineries, those with under 75,000 barrels per year, had been exempt from blending until 2010 due to potential economic hardship related to blending, and then could apply to the EPA for extending that exemption on an annual basis if they could demonstrate continued hardship. Three small refineries had let their exemption period lapse but later applied to renew their exemption, which the EPA granted. Several renewable fuels association sued on the EPA's actions, arguing that they could only extend a continuous exemption period. While the Tenth Circuit overturned the EPA's decision, the Supreme Court in their 6–3 decision reversed the Tenth Circuit and ruled in favor of the refineries, stating that under the ordinary meaning of "extension", there was no need for a refinery to have maintained a continuous exemption period to apply for such an extension.
