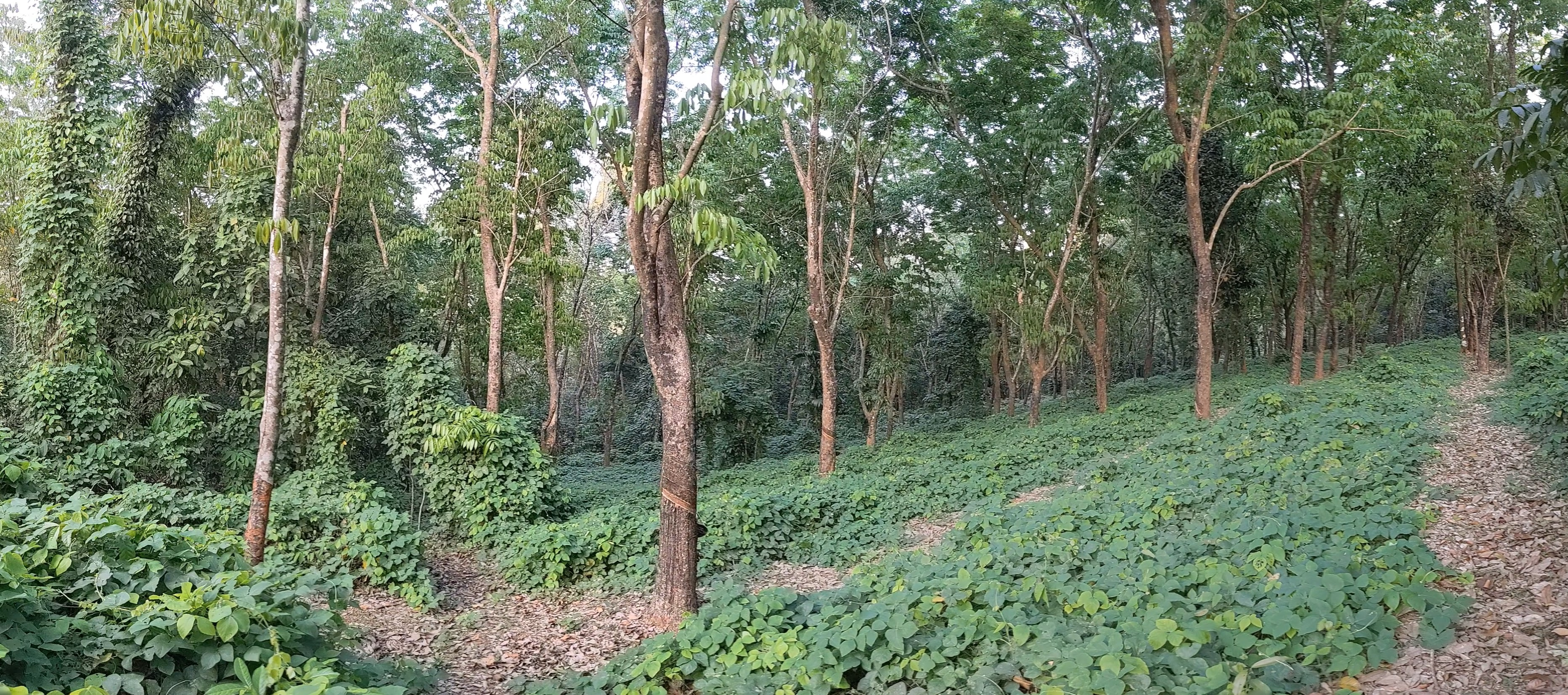
- Mucuna bracteata in a Rubber plantation in Kerala

Conservation status
- Least Concern (IUCN 3.1)

Scientific classification
- Kingdom: Plantae
- Clade: Tracheophytes
- Clade: Angiosperms
- Clade: Eudicots
- Clade: Rosids
- Order: Fabales
- Family: Fabaceae
- Subfamily: Faboideae
- Genus: Mucuna
- Species: M. bracteata

Binomial name
- Mucuna bracteata DC. ex Kurz

Synonyms
- Mucuna brevipes Craib; Mucuna exserta C.B.Clarke ex C.E.C.Fisch.; Mucuna venulosa (Piper) Merr. & F.P.Metcalf; Stizolobium bracteatum Kuntze; Stizolobium venulosum Piper

= Mucuna bracteata =

Species of legume

Mucuna bracteata is a species of leguminous plant in the family Fabaceae. It is a nitrogen-regulating plant that is used in agroecosystems operating around certain types of agricultural plant systems including: rubber trees, oil palm, citrus and coconut. M. bracteate is a cover crop which helps to cover and shield the soil from weeds or plants, as well as providing rapid growth for existing agricultural crops, preventing soil erosion, and providing nitrogen fixation. The Mucuna bracteata crop grows about 10–15 cm/day in conditions similar to those that rubber and palm oil plants thrive in.

Mucuna bracteata grows in a warm and humid ecosystem, at a temperature of about 20-35 degrees Celsius, and consistent annual rainfall. Originating in the North Eastern areas of India, M. bracteata has been introduced into Hevea rubber plantations in India and oil palm plantations in Malaysia. This plant has the potential to increase soil fertility and health through the processes of natural soil fertilization and aeration, furthermore, providing a sustainable water retention level for the soil beyond the current conditions of the rubber and palm oil plantation fields.

== Description ==
Mucuna bracteata has green leaf foliage with leguminous nodules producing fixed nitrogen leading to amino acids. The seed of the legume of the Mucuna bracteata weighs about 90–190 mg each and is black in colour. This seed, as it is a legume, provides health benefits on its own, individually, for direct consumption. The foliage of the plant creates a shade covering over the soil it occupies, having a height of approximately 30–50 cm off the ground. This plant is a creeping type which grows rapidly and controls weed population in planted areas. With a release of leave foliage, the plant provides good mulching and composting properties to the soil surrounding it.

== Geography ==
Mucuna bracteata originates from North India in forest areas of the Tripura State, which is part of Bangladesh and southwest from China. India specifically utilizes this cover crop in Kerala, India, on local rubber plantations to sustain their rubber tree crop with its primary purpose to increase nitrogen levels in the soil, in turn improving soil health and fertility.

== Growing conditions ==
This is a cover crop that grows rapidly, and is a leguminous vine. M. bracteata grows in conditions of high humidity and high temperature of an average of 28 degrees Celsius, with a constant annual rainfall.

=== Major weeds, pests, and diseases ===
Mucuna bracteata is a durable seed, but it is susceptible to a few pests. It is susceptible to insects prior to germination. There are some caterpillar species that infiltrate M. bracteata seeds to feed on the cotyledon within the seed. These problems can be avoided by storing the seeds in areas closed off from any insect access and keeping them away from any moisture. The plant however, has a high level of phenolic acids allowing M. bracteata to combat most insects and cattle disturbances.

== Cultivation ==
=== Seed treatment and seeding rate ===
Mucuna bracteata seeds have a hard seed coat that causes physical dormancy, resulting in germination rates below 20% without prior treatment. Scarification significantly improves germination: hot water treatment (80 °C for 30 seconds) or mechanical scarification raises germination rates above 80%. Treated seeds are typically raised in polybag nurseries before transplanting.

For oil palm plantations, the standard planting density is 3–5 seedlings per oil palm, corresponding to approximately 400–680 seedlings per hectare depending on palm spacing. Direct broadcast seeding requires approximately 200 g of scarified seed per 420 planting points per hectare. The seedling establishment period is approximately 3–6 months to achieve full ground cover.

=== Nitrogen fixation ===
Mucuna bracteata forms symbiotic associations with Bradyrhizobium species through root nodulation. Measured N_{2}-fixation rates range from 24.1 to 78.5 mmol N_{2} h^{−1} g^{−1} nodule dry weight under Malaysian plantation conditions. Field estimates for Malaysian oil palm applications suggest nitrogen accumulation of 120–150 kg N/ha/year in mature plantings, contributing to reduced synthetic fertiliser requirements in intercropped systems.

=== Plantation adoption and sustainability certification ===
Mucuna bracteata is the preferred leguminous cover crop (LCC) for Roundtable on Sustainable Palm Oil (RSPO)- and Malaysian Sustainable Palm Oil (MSPO)-certified plantations in Malaysia and Indonesia, where it is specified in replanting and new planting soil management guidelines. The Malaysian Palm Oil Board (MPOB) recommends it for planting on mineral, peat and sloped soils in oil palm estates.

Its shade tolerance exceeds that of Neustanthus phaseoloides (tropical kudzu) and Centrosema pubescens, making it the dominant cover species in mature oil palm blocks where inter-row light levels are low. M. bracteata is typically planted during the immature period (Year 1–3) and maintained until the oil palm canopy closes.
