= Elaeis melanococca =

Elaeis melanococca can refer to:

- Elaeis melanococca Gaertn., a synonym of Elaeis guineensis, the African oil palm
- Elaeis melanococca Mart. (an illegitimate name, but often used), a synonym of Elaeis oleifera, an American oil palm
