= Streptomyces venetus =

Scientific classification
- Domain: Bacteria
- Kingdom: Bacillati
- Phylum: Actinomycetota
- Class: Actinomycetia
- Order: Streptomycetales
- Family: Streptomycetaceae
- Genus: Streptomyces
- Species: S. venetus

Binomial name
- Streptomyces venetus Sujarit et al. 2018

Type strain
- CMU-AB225

Species of bacterium

Streptomyces venetus is a bacterium species from the genus of Streptomyces which has been isolated from rhizosphereic soil of a palm (Elaeis guineensis).

== See also ==
- List of Streptomyces species
