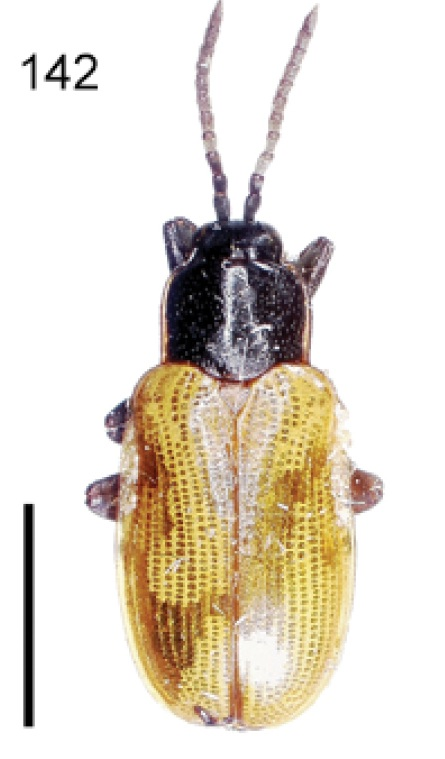

Scientific classification
- Kingdom: Animalia
- Phylum: Arthropoda
- Class: Insecta
- Order: Coleoptera
- Suborder: Polyphaga
- Infraorder: Cucujiformia
- Family: Chrysomelidae
- Genus: Cephaloleia
- Species: C. flavipennis

Binomial name
- Cephaloleia flavipennis Baly, 1869

= Cephaloleia flavipennis =

Species of beetle

Cephaloleia flavipennis is a species of beetle of the family Chrysomelidae. It is found in Brazil (Amazonas), Colombia, Ecuador and Peru.

== Description ==
Adults reach a length of about 7–7.5 mm. The head, pronotum, antennae and legs are black and the scutellum and elytron are yellowish.

== Biology ==
Adults have been collected feeding on Heliconia standleyi and Elaeis guineensis.
