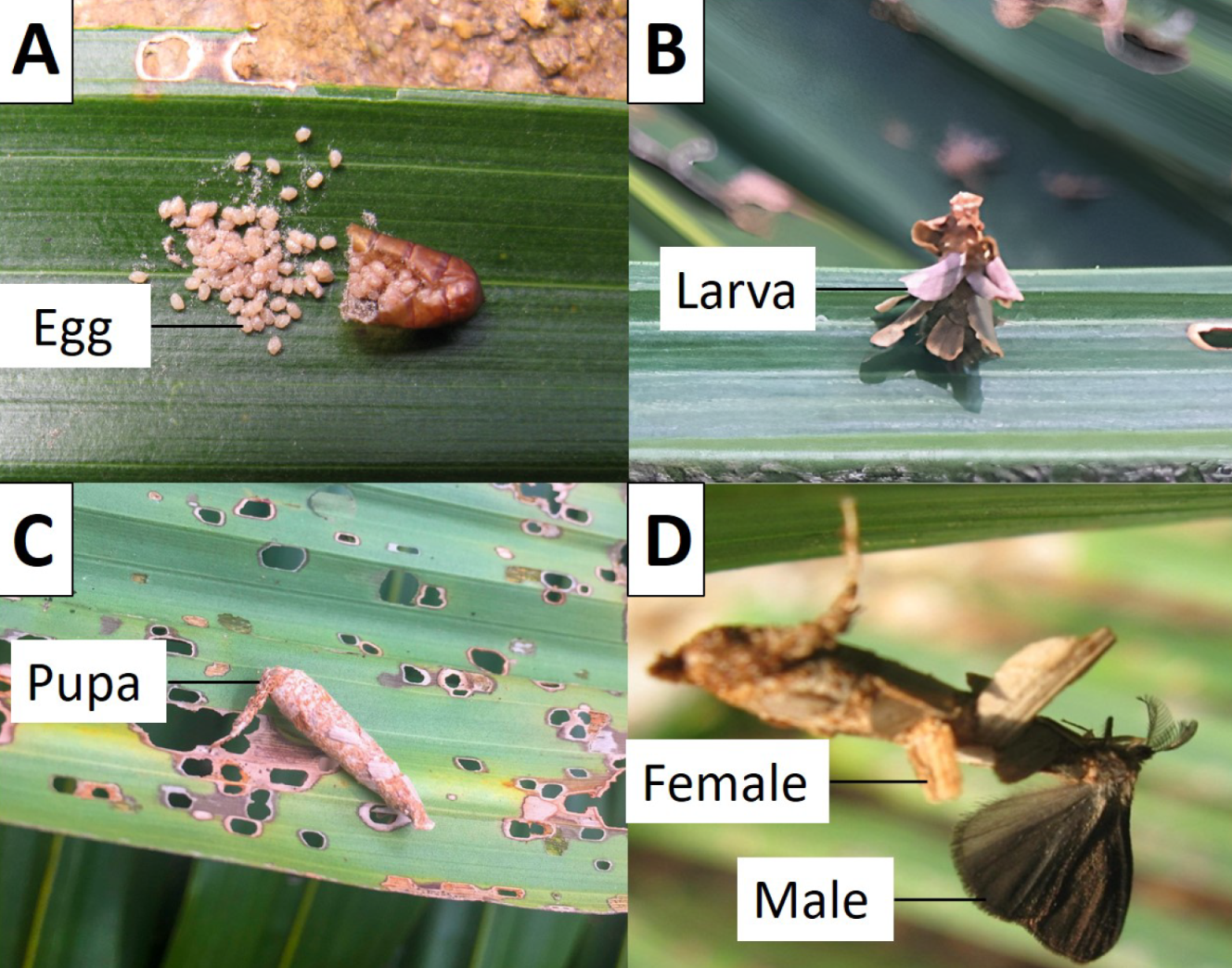
- Eggs, larva, pupa and adult of Metisa plana

Scientific classification
- Kingdom: Animalia
- Phylum: Arthropoda
- Clade: Pancrustacea
- Class: Insecta
- Order: Lepidoptera
- Family: Psychidae
- Genus: Metisa
- Species: M. plana

Binomial name
- Metisa plana Walker, 1883

Synonyms
- Dasaratha himalayana Moore, 1888; Babula grotei Moore, 1890; Babula nudilineata Hampson, 1893

= Metisa plana =

Species of moth

Metisa plana is a moth of the family Psychidae (the bagworms) first described by Francis Walker in 1883. It is found in Sumatra, Malaysia and Sri Lanka. It is a major pest on Elaeis guineensis, the African oil palm.

== Description ==
The moth completes a mean life time of 90 days. After the female lays 200–300 yellowish eggs, a single egg mass can become about 140–210 neonates. The larva has a portable case which it carries around as it feeds. The first instar is about 1 millimetre (5/128 in) long. About an hour after emergence from the case, the larva starts to construct a small case around the posterior of their body using oil palm leaves. This constructed case is cone shaped. The case enlarges with each instar. At the fourth instar, the case is covered with loosely-attached large round or rectangular leaf pieces. At the sixth instar, the case surface is smooth and without loose leaf pieces. The larva turns whitish gray. It takes a mean of 71.5 days to reach the sixth instar.

Early instar stages are brownish. Dark patches are found all over the head and thorax. The body is completely covered by sensory setae. Convex shaped stemmata are well differentiated and cover the sides of the head laterally. Thorax is immediately behind the head and comprised three true leg pairs with hooks. Abdomen comprised five pairs of prolegs. Fully grown pupa is 6.1 millimetres (31/128 in) long. Male and female pupal cases are different in color. Male pupa has a big blackish head, whereas female with creamy yellowish head. Generally females pupate away from the host.

Adults show strong sexual dimorphism. The adult female is wingless and legless. Head dark brown. Body yellowish brown. Average size is 5.5 millimetres (7/32 in). The male has a wingspan of 10–12 millimetres (13/32–15/32 in). Wings smoky brown and body is hairy black. Head chubby. Antennae feathery bipectinate (comb like on both sides). During mating, the male cuts the distal end (lower end) of the case of the female. After laying a large clutch of eggs in her case, the female leaves the case and dies a few hours later. The adult male may live 3 to 4 days.

=== Timeline ===
- Average life span from egg to adult: 90 days
- 1st instar: 9–16 days
- 2nd instar: 16–17 days
- 3rd instar: 16–18 days
- 4th instar: 10–15 days
- 5th instar: 12–16 days
- Average life span from 1st instar to 5th instar: 71.5 days
- Pupation: 8–12 days

== Ecology and control ==
It is an important pest of oil palms. Larval outbreaks have been observed from Malaysian oil palm plantations from late 1950s to early 1960s.

Applying chemical insecticides is the fastest and most effective method to control the pest, even though that causes environmental problems. A knapsack sprayer is used to spray insecticides from the ground. Chemicals such as trichlorfon and chlorpyrifos, cypermethrin and lambda-cyhalothrin can be applied as soil drenches. Chlorantraniliprole and indoxacarb are highly effective.

Biological predators such as Brachymeria carinata, Buysmania oxymora, Goryphus bunoh, Eupelmus cotoxanthae, Dolichogenidea metesae, Pediobius anomalus, Pediobius imbreus and Bacillus thuringiensis are known to be effective. Use of Apanteles metesae, Cosmelestes picticeps are also effective measures. Entomopathogenic fungi such as Paecilomyces fumosoroseus and Metarhizium anisopliae show effective results under laboratory conditions, but field observations should be carried out.

M. plana outbreaks in Malaysian plantations are highly correlated with relative humidity. Relative humidity estimates based on satellite remote sensing data were fed into both regression models and neural networks. The predictions of both were found to be closely correlated with actual M. plana appearance on plantations, with the NN producing the best results.
