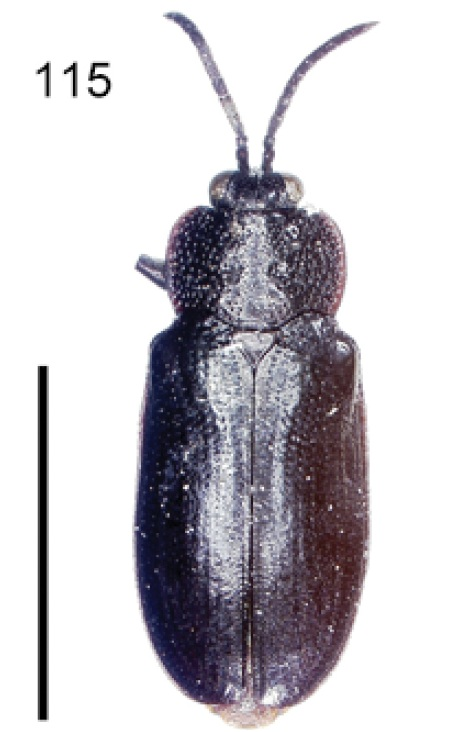

Scientific classification
- Kingdom: Animalia
- Phylum: Arthropoda
- Class: Insecta
- Order: Coleoptera
- Suborder: Polyphaga
- Infraorder: Cucujiformia
- Family: Chrysomelidae
- Genus: Cephaloleia
- Species: C. deplanata

Binomial name
- Cephaloleia deplanata Uhmann, 1927

= Cephaloleia deplanata =

Species of beetle

Cephaloleia deplanata is a species of beetle of the family Chrysomelidae. It is found in Brazil (Bahia, Rondonia), Suriname and Venezuela.

== Description ==
Adults reach a length of about 4–5 mm. Adults are pitchy-black except the lateral margin of the pronotum and elytron. The latter has a metallic sheen. The antennae and venter are brownish.

== Biology ==
Adults have been collected feeding on Elaeis guineensis.
