= Malaysian Sustainable Palm Oil =

Malaysian agricultural regulation

Malaysian Sustainable Palm Oil (MSPO) is Malaysia's national certification standard for sustainable palm oil production, established by the Malaysian government. The certification scheme aims to ensure environmentally friendly, socially responsible, and economically viable palm oil practices throughout the supply chain. It was designed to improve the competitiveness of the country's palm oil industry and strengthen sustainability practices through alignment with existing national laws and regulations.

== Overview ==
MSPO is a legally binding national certification standard developed with input from various stakeholder in the palm oil industry. Malaysia is the first country to make sustainable palm oil certification mandatory for all palm oil operations nationwide.

The certification covers the entire palm oil supply chain, from plantation management to processing facilities, and applies to various sectors including food processing and biodiesel.

As of April 2024, MSPO certification has achieved 87.4% coverage of Malaysian palm oil plantations, covering 4.94 million hectares, with 407 of the 446 palm oil mills certified under the standard.

== History and Development ==
The MSPO standard was launched by the Malaysian government in November 2013 and implemented voluntarily from January 2015, transitioning to mandatory compliance for all palm oil operations in Malaysia by the end of 2019.

To oversee this certification scheme, the Malaysian government established Malaysian Sustainable Palm Oil, formerly known as the Malaysian Palm Oil Certification Council (MPOCC), in December 2014. Incorporated as a company under the Companies Act 2016 and limited by guarantee, the organization is governed by a board of trustees and began operations in October 2015.

The development of MSPO standard involved collaboration between government agencies, industry stakeholders, and civil society organizations to create a comprehensive framework aligned with national laws and regulations.

WWF-Malaysia described the MSPO certification as a potential starting point for improving sustainability in the country's palm oil industry, and encouraged strengthening the standard through inclusive multi-stakeholder engagement.

In January 2025, Malaysia implemented MSPO 2.0 (MS2530:2022), an updated version of the original 2013 standard with stricter guidelines for sustainability, traceability, and ethical practices in palm oil production.

The MSPO 2.0 Standards are built upon five core principles: Management Commitment and Responsibility, Transparency, Compliance with Legal and Other Requirements, Social Responsibility, and Environmental Responsibility.

In 2025, Malaysia secured preferential market access for palm oil certified under the MSPO standard through the Malaysia–EFTA Economic Partnership Agreement, which includes reduced tariffs and formal recognition of MSPO as the country's sustainability certification for palm oil.

== Challenges and Criticisms ==
Like other sustainability standards, MSPO faces various challenges including:

- Implementation costs for smallholders
- Balancing economic viability with sustainability goals
- Market recognition and acceptance
- Land title and ownership issues

== See also ==
- Palm oil production in Malaysia
- Ministry of Plantation and Commodities
- Malaysian Palm Oil Board
- Roundtable on Sustainable Palm Oil (RSPO)
- Sustainability standards and certification
- Environmental, social, and governance
