= Palm kernel oil =

Edible plant oil

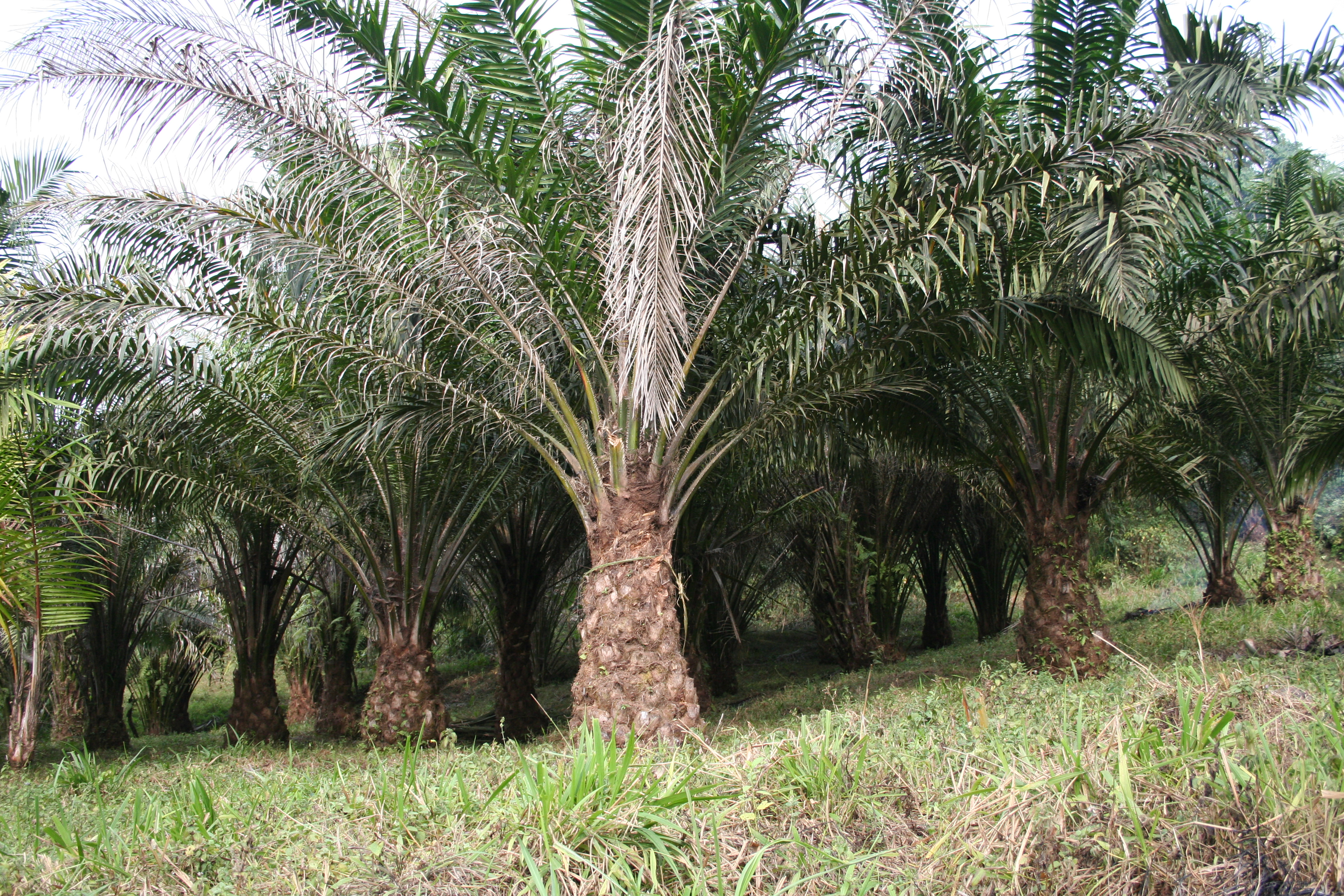
Oil palm tree (Elaeis guineensis)

Palm kernel oil is an edible plant oil derived from the kernel of the oil palm tree Elaeis guineensis. It is related to two other edible oils: palm oil, extracted from the fruit pulp of the oil palm, and coconut oil, extracted from the kernel of the coconut.

Palm kernel oil, palm oil, and coconut oil are three of the few highly saturated vegetable fats; these oils give the name to the 16-carbon saturated fatty acid palmitic acid that they contain.

Palm kernel oil, which is semi-solid at room temperature, is more saturated than palm oil and comparable to coconut oil.

== History ==
Year	Production, million tonnes
2008–09	11.75
2009–10	12.22
2010–11	12.55
2011–12	13.28

Oil from the African oil palm Elaeis guineensis has long been recognized in West African and Central African countries. European merchants trading with West Africa occasionally purchased palm oil for use in Europe, but palm kernel oil remained rare outside West Africa.

The USDA has published historical production figures for palm kernel oil for years beginning October 1 and ending September 30:

Palm kernel oil production

Yearly per capita supply of palm kernel oil

== Research institutions ==
In the 1960s, research and development (R&D) in oil palm breeding began to expand after Malaysia's Department of Agriculture established an exchange program with West African economies and four private plantations formed the Oil Palm Genetics Laboratory. The Malaysian government also established Kolej Serdang, which became the Universiti Pertanian Malaysia (UPM) in the 1970s to train agricultural and agroindustrial engineers and agribusiness graduates to conduct research in the field.

In 1979 with support from the Malaysian Agricultural Research and Development Institute (MARDI) and UPM, the government set up the Palm Oil Research Institute of Malaysia (Porim), a public-and-private-coordinated institution. B. C. Shekhar was appointed founder and chairman. Porim's scientists work in oil palm tree breeding, palm oil nutrition and potential oleochemical use. Porim was renamed Malaysian Palm Oil Board in 2000.

== Nutrition ==
Palm kernel oil, similar to coconut oil, is high in saturated fats and is more saturated than palm oil. Palm kernel oil is high in lauric acid, which has been shown to raise blood cholesterol levels, both as LDL-C (cholesterol contained in low-density lipoprotein), which increase the risk of cardiovascular disease, and HDL-C (cholesterol contained in high-density lipoprotein), which has been shown to lower it. However, the raise in total cholesterol concentration is partly due to more HDL-C than LDL-C. Palm kernel oil does not contain cholesterol or trans fatty acids.

Palm kernel oil is commonly used in commercial cooking because it is lower in cost than other oils, remains stable at high cooking temperature, and can be stored longer than other vegetable oils.

The approximate concentration of fatty acids (FAs) in palm kernel oil is as follows:

Fatty acid content of palm kernel oil
Type of fatty acid	Fraction
Lauric saturated C12	48.2%
Myristic saturated C14	16.2%
Palmitic saturated C16	8.4%
Capric saturated C10	3.4%
Caprylic saturated C8	3.3%
Stearic saturated C18	2.5%
Oleic monounsaturated C18:1	15.3%
Linoleic polyunsaturated C18:2	2.3%
Other/Unknown	0.4%
red: saturated orange: monounsaturated blue: polyunsaturated

== Uses ==
Splitting of oils and fats by hydrolysis, or under basic conditions saponification, yields fatty acids, with glycerin (glycerol) as a byproduct. The split-off fatty acids are a mixture ranging from C4 to C18, depending on the type of oil or fat.

Derivatives of palmitic acid were used in combination with naphtha during World War II to produce napalm (aluminum naphthenate and aluminum palmitate).

== See also ==
- Palm kernel
- Tropical agriculture
- Food vs. fuel
