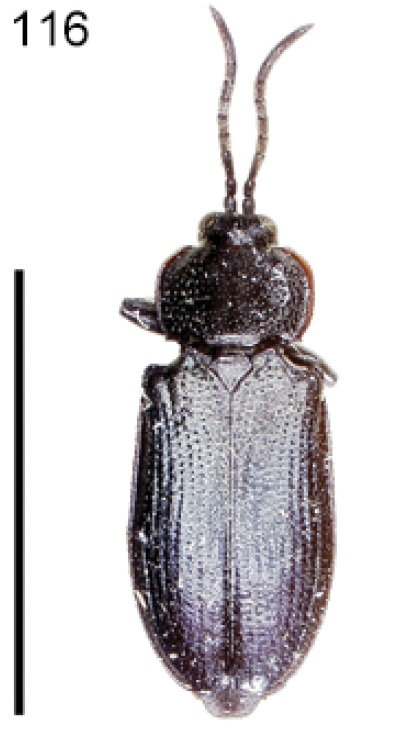

Scientific classification
- Kingdom: Animalia
- Phylum: Arthropoda
- Clade: Pancrustacea
- Class: Insecta
- Order: Coleoptera
- Suborder: Polyphaga
- Infraorder: Cucujiformia
- Family: Chrysomelidae
- Genus: Cephaloleia
- Species: C. depressa

Binomial name
- Cephaloleia depressa Baly, 1858

= Cephaloleia depressa =

Species of beetle

Cephaloleia depressa is a species of beetle of the family Chrysomelidae. It is found in Brazil (Bahia, Matto Grosso, Pará) and Ecuador.

== Description ==
Adults reach a length of about 3.5–3.9 mm. Adults are black, with the lateral margins of the pronotum paler.

== Biology ==
The hostplant is Elaeis guineensis.
