= Streptomyces palmae =

Scientific classification
- Domain: Bacteria
- Kingdom: Bacillati
- Phylum: Actinomycetota
- Class: Actinomycetia
- Order: Streptomycetales
- Family: Streptomycetaceae
- Genus: Streptomyces
- Species: S. palmae

Binomial name
- Streptomyces palmae Sujarit et al. 2016

Type strain
- JCM 31289, CMU-AB204, TBRC 1999

Species of bacterium

Streptomyces palmae is a bacterium species from the genus of Streptomyces which has been isolated from rhizosphere soil from the palm Elaeis guineensis in Chiang Mai in Thailand.

== See also ==
- List of Streptomyces species
