= Yusof Basiron =

- Born: 20 June 1948 (age 78); Rembau, Negri Sembilan, Malaya
- Citizenship: Malaysia
- Education: Royal Military College (Malaysia); University of Canterbury; University of Stirling
- Board member of: Malaysian Palm Oil Council (CEO); Sime Darby (non-executive)

Yusof Basiron (born 20 June 1948) is a scientist and an influential public figure in the Malaysian palm oil industry. He was the CEO of the Malaysian Palm Oil Council (MPOC), and a non-independent non-executive director on the board of Sime Darby.

== Education ==
Basiron went to Royal Military College (Malaysia), an all-boys military school. He earned his bachelor's degree in chemical engineering at the University of Canterbury in New Zealand in 1972. He also has multiple post-graduate degrees, including a PhD in applied economics and management science from the University of Stirling in Scotland completed in 1986.

== Career ==
In 1979, Basiron joined the Palm Oil Research Institute of Malaysia (PORIM) and later became their director-general in 1992. He continued to serve as director-general of the Malaysian Palm Oil Board (MPOB) when it was formed in April 2000, through a merger of PORIM and the Palm Oil Registration and Licensing Authority (PORLA). He left his position as director-general of the MPOB in 2006 and served as CEO of the Malaysian Palm Oil Council (MPOC).

== Awards and recognition ==
In 2017, Basiron was conferred "Leadership Award" for his contribution as CEO at the annual Malaysian Palm Oil Council (MPOC) Leadership Awards.

In August 2017 Yusof Basiron was elected as a Fellow of the Institution of Chemical Engineers.
