= Augustine Ong =

Malaysian chemist

Tan Sri Augustine Ong Soon Hock (Chinese: 王顺福; born 18 September 1934) is a Malaysian scientist, academic, and board member. He is internationally recognized in the field of lipid chemistry.

== Education ==
After studied at St. Francis Institution in Malacca, Ong furthered his study at St. John's Institution in Kuala Lumpur. He obtained Bachelor of Science with First Class, and later completed Master of Science, both from University of Malaya. After that, he graduated from King's College London with a PhD in organic chemistry.

== Career ==
Ong was the Fulbright-Hays Fellow at the Massachusetts Institute of Technology (MIT) 1966 to 1967. He spent a sabbatical year in the University of Oxford as the Visiting Professor at the Dyson Perrins Laboratory, 1976 to 1977.

Ong was serving as Dean, School of Chemical Sciences, and Universiti Sains Malaysia before joining the private sector where he was the former Director-General of the Palm Oil Research Institute of Malaysia (PORIM) from 1987 to 1989 and former Director in Science and Technology, Malaysian Palm Oil Promotion Council (MPOPC) from 1990 to 1996.

Ong has been the Chairman of the International Society for Fat Research (ISF) since 1997 and the President of the Malaysian Oil Scientists' and Technologists' Association, Senior Fellow of the Academy of Sciences, Malaysia, Fellow of the Royal Society of Chemistry London and Fellow of the Third World Academy of Sciences.

He has been active in research and development since 1959, with experience in the chemistry and technology of palm oil. He has 14 patents in the technology of palm oil to his credit and published more than 380 articles.

He was the founding editor-in-chief of Elaeis: International Journal of Oil Palm Research and Development and is still a member of the Editorial Board.

He played a significant role in the programme to counter the Anti-Palm Oil Campaign from 1987 to 1989. He has been invited to serve as a member of Research Advisory Panels on Cocoa, Forestry, Rubber and Petroleum as well as a member of International Advisory Council in Universiti Tunku Abdul Rahman. He is Founder President of the Malaysian Invention and Design Society (MINDS) since 1986. He is also President of the Confederation of Scientific and Technology Associations in Malaysia (COSTAM) and Malaysian Oil Scientists and Technologists' Association (MOSTA). He serves on the Board of several corporate organizations including University of Malaya, Malaysian-American Commission on Educational Exchange (MACEE), Country Heights Holdings Berhad. He had served as Director, HSBC (Malaysia) since its incorporation till 2004.

== Honour ==
=== Honour of Malaysia ===
- Malaysia
  - Companion of the Order of Loyalty to the Crown of Malaysia (J.S.M.) (1984)
  - Commander of the Order of Loyalty to the Crown of Malaysia (P.S.M.) — Tan Sri (1992)
