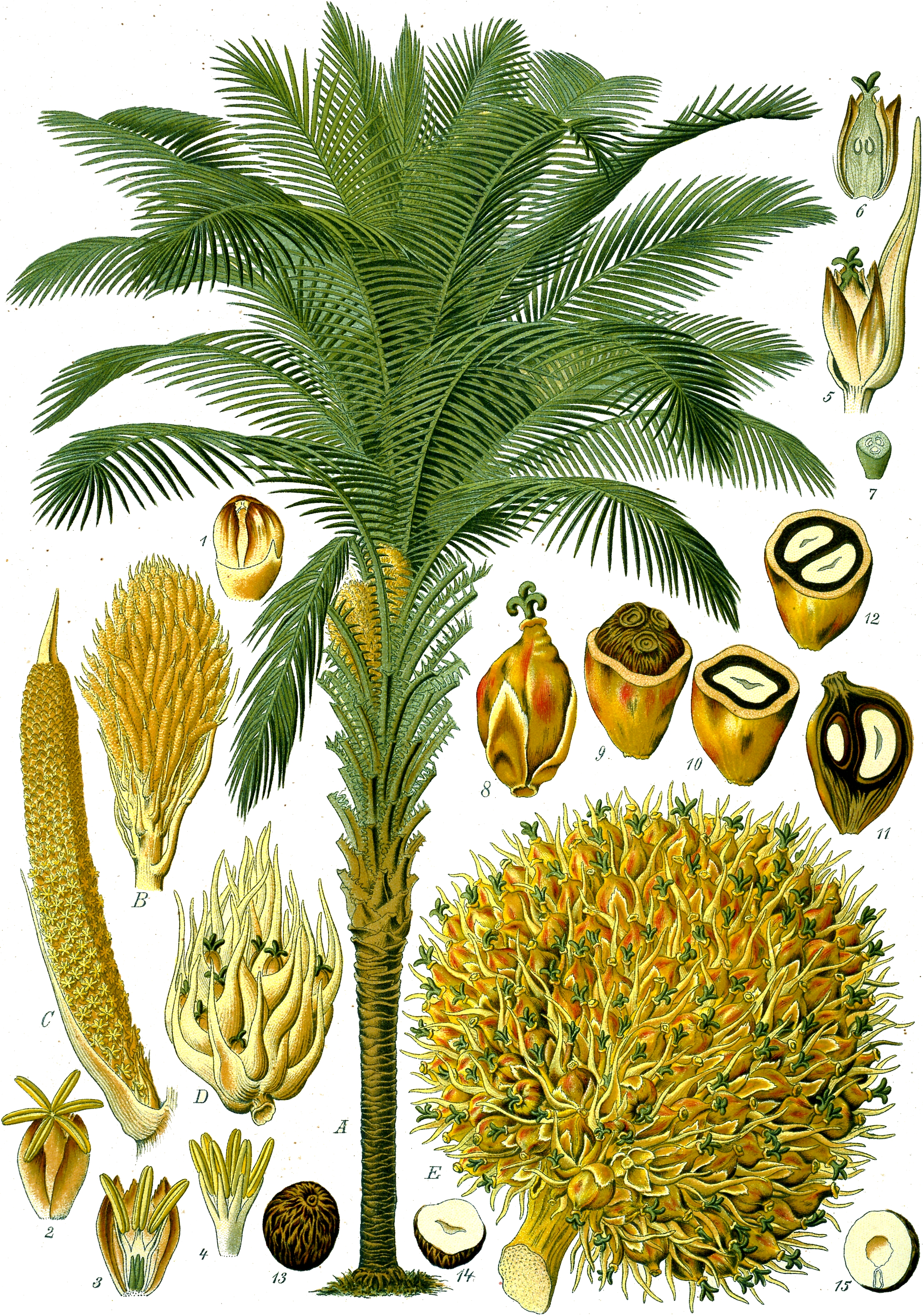
- African oil palm (Elaeis guineensis)

Conservation status
- Least Concern (IUCN 3.1)

Scientific classification
- Kingdom: Plantae
- Clade: Tracheophytes
- Clade: Angiosperms
- Clade: Monocots
- Clade: Commelinids
- Order: Arecales
- Family: Arecaceae
- Genus: Elaeis
- Species: E. guineensis

Binomial name
- Elaeis guineensis Jacq.

Synonyms
- Elaeis dybowskii Hua; E. macrophylla A.Chev. (nom. inval.); E. madagascariensis (Jum. & H.Perrier) Becc.; E. melanococca Gaertn.; E. nigrescens (A.Chev.) Prain (nom. inval.); E. virescens (A.Chev.) Prain; Palma oleosa Mill.

= Elaeis guineensis =

African oil palm

Species of palm

Elaeis guineensis is a species of palm commonly called oil palm but also sometimes African oil palm or macaw-fat. The first Western person to describe it and bring back seeds was the French naturalist Michel Adanson.

It is native to west and southwest Africa, specifically the area between Angola and The Gambia; the species name, guineensis, refers to the name for the area called Guinea, and not the modern country Guinea now bearing that name. The species is also now naturalised in Madagascar, Sri Lanka, Malaysia, Indonesia, Central America, Cambodia, the West Indies, and several islands in the Indian and Pacific Oceans. The closely related American oil palm E. oleifera and a more distantly related palm, Attalea maripa, are also used to produce palm oil.

E. guineensis was domesticated in West Africa along the south-facing Atlantic coast. There is insufficient documentation and as of 2019 insufficient research to make any guesses as to when this occurred. Human use of oil palms may date as far back as 5,000 years in Egypt; in the late 1800s, archaeologists discovered palm oil in a tomb at Abydos, Egypt, dating back to 3000 BCE (but this information needs further investigation, due to recent reviews. The oil found in Abydos may be just date oil or even animal fats).

It is the principal source of palm oil. Oil palms can produce much more oil per unit of land area than most other oil-producing plants (about nine times more than soy and 4.5 times more than rapeseed).

== Description ==
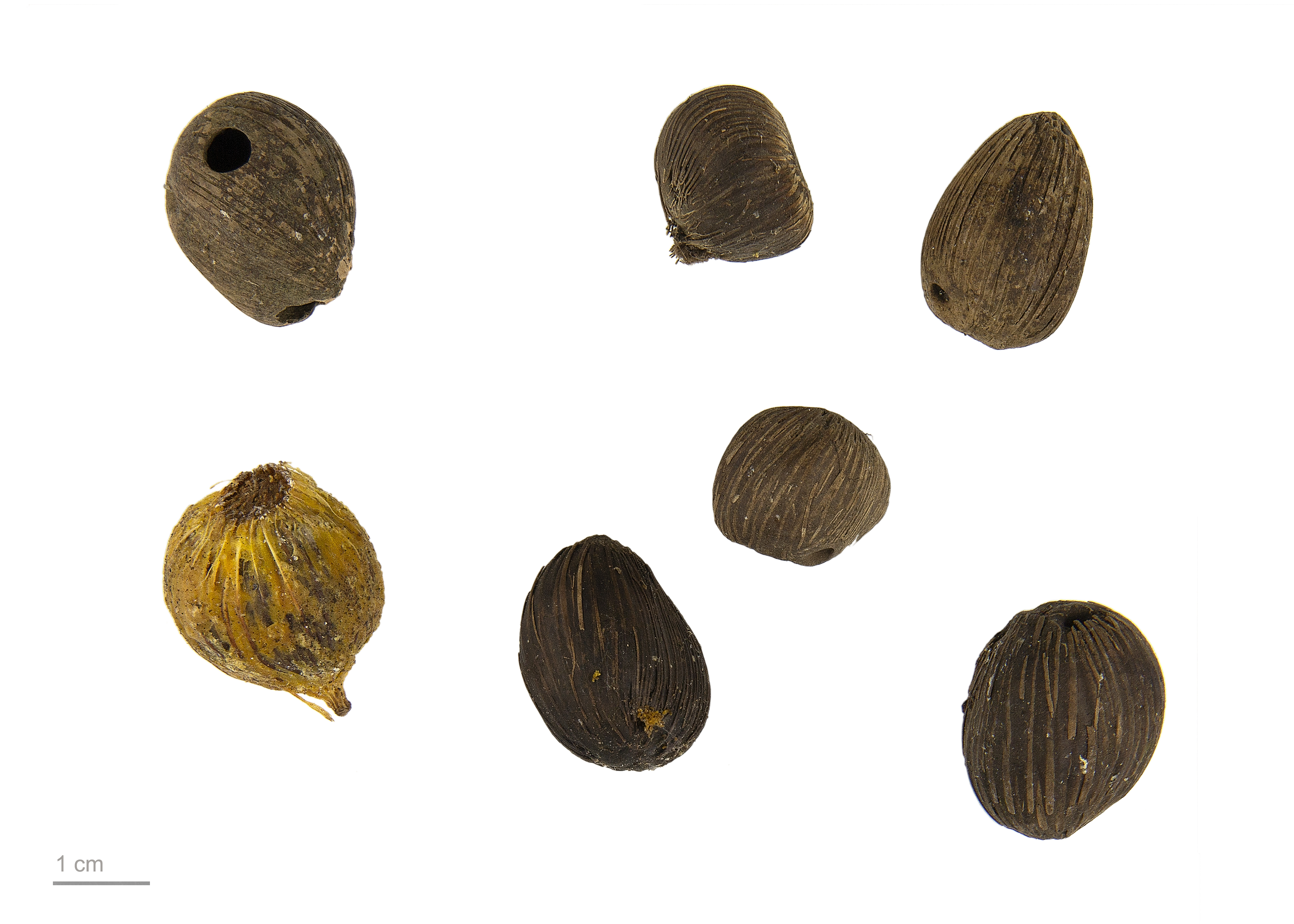
Elaeis guineensis idolatrica MHNT

E. guineensis is monocotyledonous. Mature palms are single-stemmed and grow to 20 meters (66 ft) tall. The leaves are pinnate and reach 3–5 m (10–16 1/2 ft) long. A young palm produces about 30 leaves a year. Established palms over 10 years produce about 20 leaves a year. The flowers are produced in dense clusters; each individual flower is small, with three sepals and three petals.

The palm fruit takes 5–6 months to develop from pollination to maturity. It is reddish, about the size of a large plum, and grows in large bunches. Each fruit is made up of an oily, fleshy outer layer (the pericarp), with a single seed (the palm kernel), also rich in oil. When ripe, each bunch of fruit weighs between 5 and 30 kg (11 and 66 lb) depending on the age of the palm tree.

== Planting ==
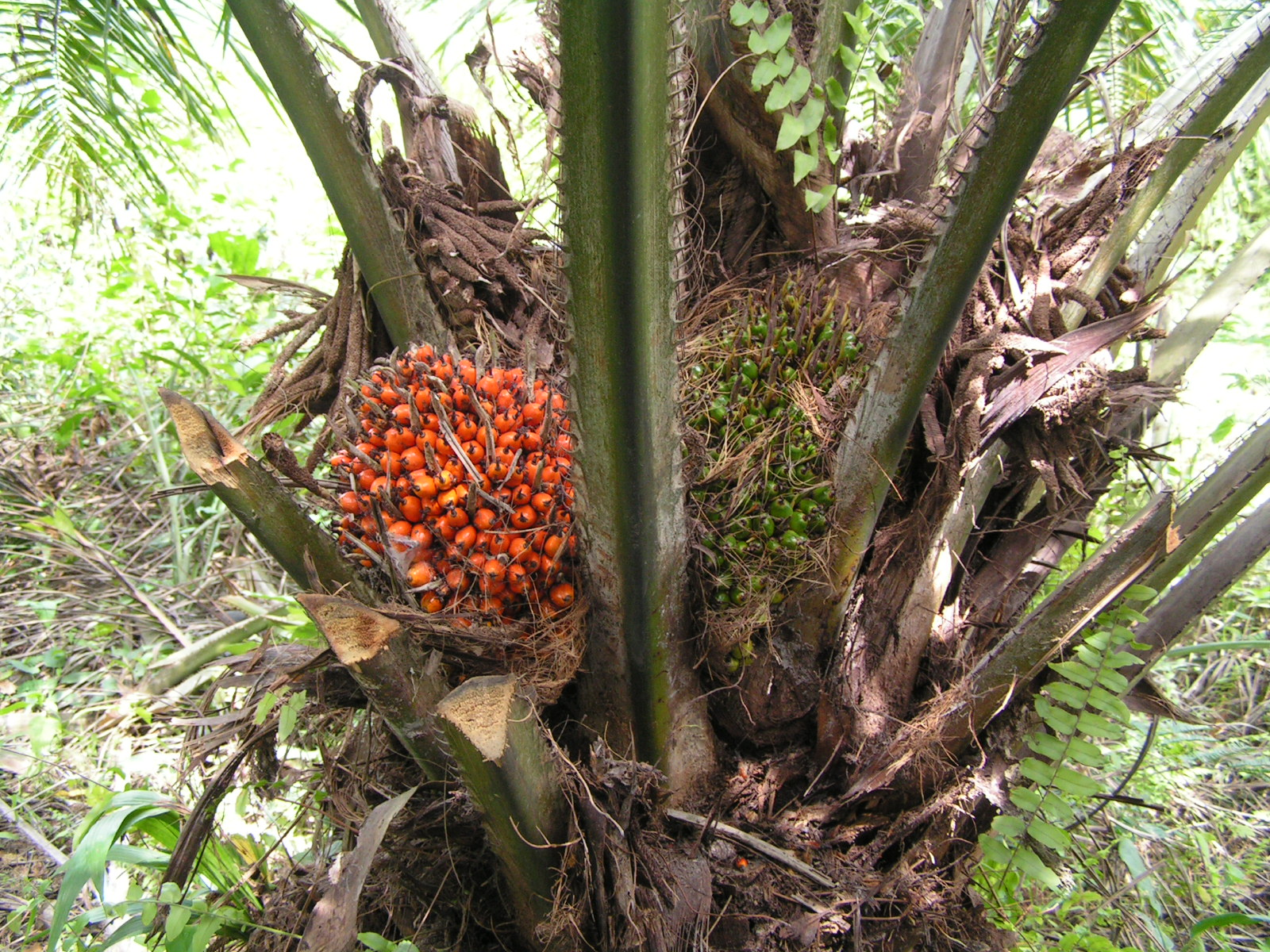
Fruit

Oil palm fruit is one of the most widely produced primary crops in the world.

For each hectare of oil palm, which is harvested year-round, the annual production averages 20 tonnes of fruit yielding 4,000 kg of palm oil and 750 kg of seed kernels yielding 500 kg of high-quality palm kernel oil, as well as 600 kg of kernel meal. Kernel meal is processed for use as livestock feed.

All modern, commercial planting material consists of tenera palms or DxP hybrids, which are obtained by crossing thickshelled dura with shell-less pisifera. Although common commercial germinated seed is as thick-shelled as the dura mother palm, the resulting palm will produce thin-shelled tenera fruit. An alternative to germinated seed, once constraints to mass production are overcome, are tissue-cultured or "clonal" palms, which provide true copies of high-yielding DxP palms.

== Genetics ==
=== Genome ===
Size: 1,800 megabase. First sequence available in 2013.

=== Chromosomes ===
Diploid, with a diploid number of 2n = 32.

=== Diversity ===
The Asian effective population size is very limited. The cultivars comprising cultivation in Asia descend from only four trees, which are themselves probably the result of a selfing of one parent.

=== Breeding ===
Unlike other relatives, oil palms do not produce offshoots; propagation is by sowing the seeds.

Several varieties and forms of E. guineensis have been selected that have different characteristics. These include:

- Elais guineensis fo. dura
- Elais guineensis var. pisifera
- Elais guineensis fo. tenera

Before the Second World War, selection work had started in the Deli dura population in Malaya. Pollen was imported from Africa, and DxT and DxP crosses were made. Segregation of fruit forms in crosses made in the 1950s was often incorrect. In the absence of a good marker gene, there was no way of knowing whether control of pollination was adequate.

After the work of Beirnaert and Vanderweyen (1941), it became feasible to monitor the efficacy of controlled pollination. From 1963 until the introduction of the palm-pollinating weevil Elaeidobius kamerunicus in 1982, contamination in Malaysia's commercial plantings was generally low. Thrips, the main pollinating agent at that time, apparently rarely gained access to bagged female inflorescences. However, E. kamerunicus is much more persistent, and after it was introduced, Deli dura contamination became a significant problem. This problem apparently persisted for much of the 1980s, but in a 1991 comparison of seed sources, contamination had been reduced to below 2%, indicating control had been restored.

A 1992 study at a trial plot in Banting, Selangor, revealed the "yield of Deli dura oil palms after four generations of selection was 60% greater than that of the unselected base population. Crossing the dura and pisifera to give the thin-shelled tenera fruit type improved partitioning of dry matter within the fruit, giving a 30% increase in oil yield at the expense of shell, without changing total dry matter production."

Cros et al., 2014 find genomic selection is very effective in this crop.

=== Agronomic genes ===
In 2013, the gene responsible for controlling shell thickness was discovered, making it possible to verify tenera (DxP) status while palms are still in the nursery.

The DEFICIENS gene regulates floral architecture. One of its epialleles, Bad Karma, reduces yield.

== Pollination ==
E. guineensis is almost entirely pollinated by insects and not by wind. (Note: p. 130) Elaeidobius kamerunicus is the most specially adapted pollination partner in Africa. It has been deliberately introduced into southeast Asia in 1981 and the results have been dramatic – Cik Mohd Rizuan et al., 2013 find good results in Felda Sahabat in Sabah. Contrary to earlier speculation, the introduced population was not too inbred, and inbreeding depression was not the cause of some incidences of lessened fruit set in SEA. Other causes have been proposed. E. kamerunicus and the pollination it provides can be negatively affected by nematodes.

== Pests ==
=== Disease ===
Worldwide the two most impactful diseases are Ganoderma orbiforme (syn. Ganoderma boninense, basal stem rot, BSR, reviewed by Chong et al., 2017) and Phytophthora palmivora (bud rot, reviewed by Torres et al. 2016). The earliest stages of data gathering and investigation have been performed for disease resistance breeding however propagation material is not available and full breeding programs are not ongoing as of 2015. (Note: p. 425)

==== Ganoderma boninense/orbiforme, Basal Stem Rot (BSR) ====
Basal stem rot is the most serious disease of oil palm in Malaysia and Indonesia. Previously, research on basal stem rot was hampered by the failure to artificially infect oil palms with the fungus. Although Ganoderma had been associated with BSR, proof of its pathogenicity to satisfy Koch's postulate was only achieved in the early 1990s by inoculating oil palm seedling roots or by using rubber wood blocks. A reliable and quick technique was developed for testing the pathogenicity of the fungus by inoculating oil palm germinated seeds.

This fatal disease can lead to losses as much as 80% after repeated planting cycles. Ganoderma produces enzymes that degrade the infected xylem, thus causing serious problems to the distribution of water and other nutrients to the top of the palm. Ganoderma infection is well defined by its lesion in the stem. The cross-section of infected palm stem shows that the lesion appears as a light brown area of rotting tissue with a distinctive, irregularly shaped, darker band at the borders of this area. The infected tissue become as an ashen-grey powdery and if the palm remains standing, the infected trunk rapidly becomes hollow.

In a 2007 study in Portugal, scientists suggested control of the fungus on oil palms would benefit from further consideration of the process as one of white rot. Ganoderma is an extraordinary organism capable exclusively of degrading lignin to carbon dioxide and water; celluloses are then available as nutrients for the fungus. It is necessary to consider this mode of attack as a white rot involving lignin biodegradation, for integrated control. The existing literature does not report this area and appears to be concerned particularly with the mode of spread and molecular biology of Ganoderma. The white rot perception opens up new fields in breeding/selecting for resistant cultivars of oil palms with high lignin content, ensuring the conditions for lignin decomposition are reduced, and simply sealing damaged oil palms to stop decay. The spread likely is by spores rather than roots. The knowledge gained can be employed in the rapid degradation of oil palm waste on the plantation floor by inoculating suitable fungi, and/or treating the waste more appropriately (e.g. chipping and spreading over the floor rather than windrowing).

Markom et al., 2009 developed and successfully used an electronic nose system for detection.

==== Phytophthora palmivora ====
Phytophthora palmivora has caused a loss of 5,000 hectares (12,355 acres) of E. guineensis near San Lorenzo in Ecuador. The protozoa cause bud rot (Spanish: pudrición del cogollo). In reaction, growers there replanted using a hybrid of E. guineensis and E. oleifera, the South American oil palm.

==== Endophytic bacteria ====
Endophytic bacteria are organisms inhabiting plant organs that at some time in their life cycles can colonize the internal plant tissues without causing apparent harm to the host. Introducing endophytic bacteria to the roots to control plant disease is to manipulate the indigenous bacterial communities of the roots in a manner, which leads to enhanced suppression of soil-borne pathogens. The use of endophytic bacteria should thus be preferred to other biological control agents, as they are internal colonizers, with better ability to compete within the vascular systems, limiting Ganoderma for both nutrients and space during its proliferation. Two bacterial isolates, Burkholderia cepacia (B3) and Pseudomonas aeruginosa (P3) were selected for evaluation in the glasshouse for their efficacy in enhancing growth and subsequent suppression of the spread of BSR in oil palm seedlings.

==== Little leaf syndrome ====
Little leaf syndrome has not been fully explained, but has often been confused with boron deficiency. The growing point is damaged, sometimes by Oryctes beetles. Small, distorted leaves resembling those due to a boron deficiency emerge. This is often followed by secondary pathogenic infections in the spear that can lead to spear rot and palm death.

==== Cadang-cadang ====
Cadang-cadang disease is a viral disease that also infects coconuts.

==== Bursaphelenchus cocophilus/Red Ring Disease (RRD) ====
Red ring disease is caused by Bursaphelenchus cocophilus, see §Nematode pests below.

==== Insects as vectors ====
Besides direct damage to plant material, insects are also vectors of oil palm diseases.

=== Arthropod pests ===
==== Metisa plana ====
M. plana is a Lepidopteran moth and a major pest of oil palms in Malaysia. M. plana outbreaks in Malaysia are highly correlated with relative humidity. Relative humidity estimates based on satellite remote sensing data were fed into both regression models and neural networks. The predictions of both were found to be closely correlated with actual M. plana appearance on plantations, with the NN producing the best results.

==== Raoiella indica ====
As of 2012 R. indica was invading the Yucatan (Note: p. 128) placing 11 states of Mexico under phytosanitary vigilance. (Note: Supplemental Table 1)

==== Rhynchophorus ferrugineus ====
R. ferrugineus has placed 13 states of Mexico under phytosanitary vigilance.

==== Other arthropods ====
Other arthropods include: Bagworm moths (the Psychidae family), the coconut rhinoceros beetle (Oryctes rhinoceros), Rhynchophorus palmarum (the South American palm weevil), Tirathaba mundella (the oil palm bunch moth), and Tirathaba rufivena (the coconut spike moth).

=== Vertebrate pests ===
==== Mammal pests ====
Besides direct damage to plant material, rats also predate on Elaeidobius kamerunicus, the African palm pollinating weevil.

Chimpanzees (Pan troglodytes) are known to use stones to crack open the nuts of E. guineensis, a rare example of tool use by animals.

==== Avian pests ====
Grey parrots (Psittacus erithacus) are known to prefer oil palm fruit in the wild. One of their chief predators, the palm-nut vulture (Gypohierax angolensis), also heavily depends on oil palm fruit for its diet, making up over 60% of the adult bird's diet and over 90% of the juvenile bird's diet (along with Raffia palm).

=== Nematode pests ===
Bursaphelenchus cocophilus is a nematode pest which is better known for infecting coconut palms. (It also afflicts a few other of the Arecaceae.) It causes "red ring disease", so named because it produces a red colored layer within the trunk of the tree, which looks like a red ring in a cross section cut. B. cocophilus is obligately transmitted as the third juvenile stage by vectors, specifically several species of weevil. Unlike congener B. xylophilus there are not thought to be any non plant hosts to serve as reservoir hosts for infection of E. guineensis. Besides direct infestation of the palm, other nematodes infest the pollinating weevil Elaeidobius kamerunicus, reducing pollination and yield.

=== Detection ===
Because each tree is relatively big and has an individual value, information about its pest and disease status is valuable. Although visual inspection is the oldest method, others are under development or occasional use.

==== Basal stem rot ====
Volatiles and microfocus X-ray fluorescence are two methods can be used to non-invasively detect pre-emergence Ganoderma orbiforme disease as a lab test. Sonic tomography is already in use with good results, at 96% accuracy. On the other hand satellite imagery and computer vision has low classification accuracy as to severity.

== History ==
Oil palms were introduced to Java by the Dutch in 1848, and to Malaysia (then the British colony of Malaya) in 1910 by Scotsman William Sime and English banker Henry Darby. The species of palm tree Elaeis guineensis was taken to Malaysia from Eastern Nigeria in 1961. As noted it originally grew in West Africa. The southern coast of Nigeria was originally called the Palm oil coast by the first Europeans who arrived there and traded in the commodity. This area was later renamed the Bight of Biafra.

In traditional African medicine different parts of the plant are used as laxative and diuretic, as a poison antidote, as a cure for gonorrhea, menorrhagia, and bronchitis, to treat headaches and rheumatism, to promote healing of fresh wounds and treat skin infections.

In Yoruba religion, it is associated with its creation myth as the first tree that Ọbatala finds descending to earth; it is also believed as Ọrunmila's axis mundi connecting heaven and earth. Thus, oil palm fronds often mark areas of sacred religious importance or are incorporated into traditional orisha garments; its kernels are also prepared to use as a tool of receiving Ọrunmila's words to the babalawo.

In Cambodia, this palm was introduced as a decorative plant in public gardens, its Khmer name is dôô:ng préing (doong=palm, preing=oil).

=== Malaysia ===
In Malaysia, the first plantations were mostly established and operated by British plantation owners, such as Sime Darby and Boustead, and remained listed in London until the Malaysian government engineered their "Malaysianisation" throughout the 1960s and 1970s.

Federal Land Development Authority (Felda) is the world's biggest oil palm planter, with planted area close to 900,000 hectares in Malaysia and Indonesia. Felda was formed on July 1, 1956, when the Land Development Act came into force with the main aim of eradicating poverty. Settlers were each allocated 10 acres of land (about 4 hectares) planted either with oil palm or rubber, and given 20 years to pay off the debt for the land.

After Malaysia achieved independence in 1957, the government focused on value-added of rubber planting, boosting exports, and alleviating poverty through land schemes. In the 1960s and 1970s, the government encouraged planting of other crops, to cushion the economy when world prices of tin and rubber plunged. Rubber estates gave way to oil palm plantations. In 1961, Felda's first oil palm settlement opened, with 3.75 km^{2} of land. As of 2000, 6855.2 km^{2} (approximately 76%) of the land under Felda's programmes were devoted to oil palms. By 2008, Felda's resettlement broadened to 112,635 families, who work on 8533.13 km^{2} of agriculture land throughout Malaysia. Oil palm planting took up 84% of Felda's plantation landbank.

Felda's success led to the establishment of other development schemes to support the establishment of small-farmer oil palm cultivation. The Federal Land Consolidation and Rehabilitation Authority (FELCRA) was established in 1966 and the Sarawak Land Consolidation and Rehabilitation Authority (SALCRA) was formed in 1976. The primary objective of these organizations is to assist in the development of rural communities and reduce poverty through the cultivation of high yielding crops such as palm oil.

As of November 2011, SALCRA had developed 18 estates totalling approximately 51,000 hectares. That year the organization shared dividends with 16,374 landowners participating in the program.

== Palm oil production ==
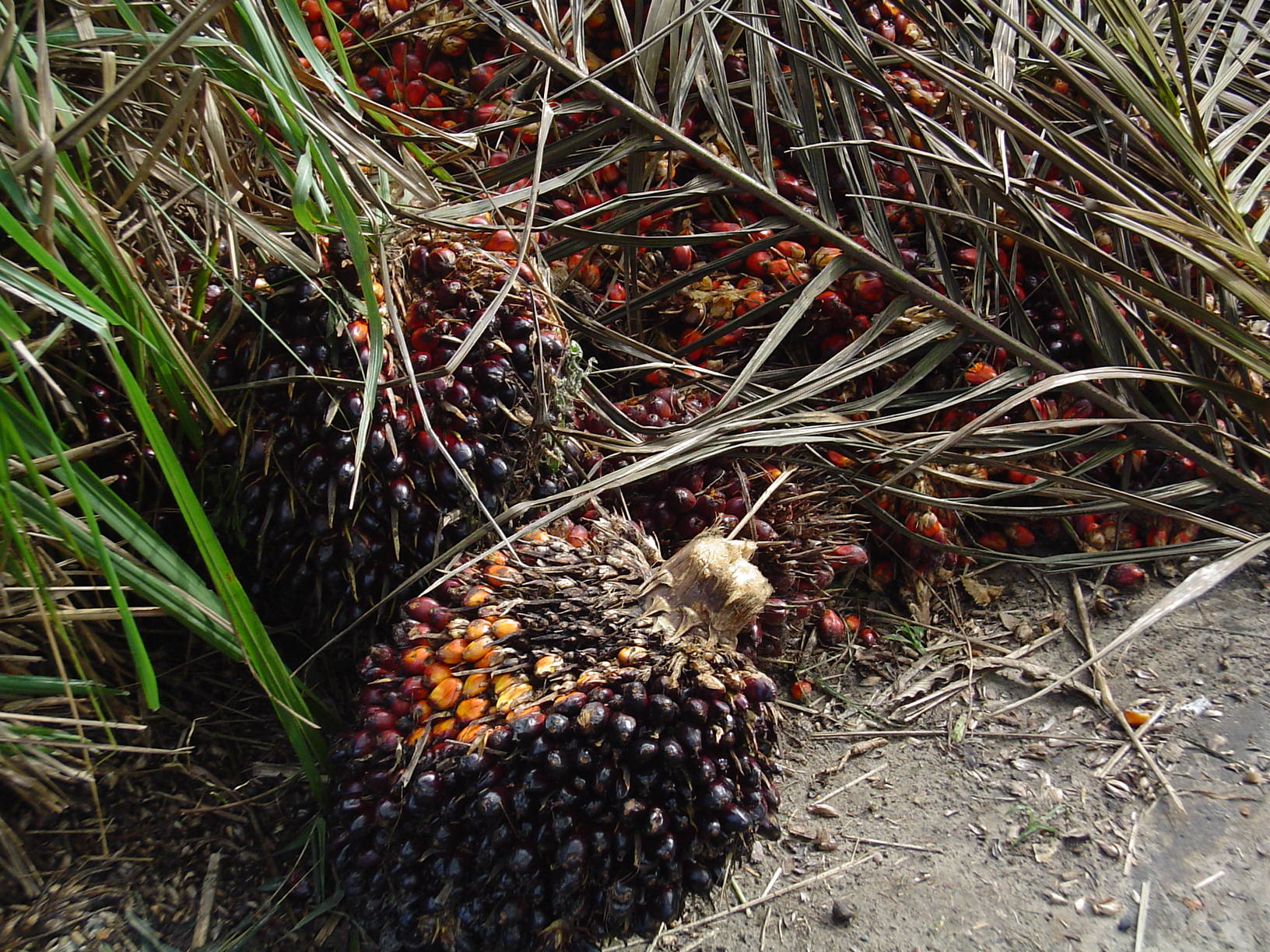
Fruit of the oil palm

Production Of oil palm fruit worldwide, by country in 2021

Oil is extracted from both the pulp of the fruit (palm oil, an edible oil) and the kernel (palm kernel oil, used in foods and for soap manufacture). For every 100 kg of fruit bunches, typically 22 kg of palm oil and 1.6 kg of palm kernel oil can be extracted.

The high oil yield of oil palms (as high as 7,250 liters per hectare per year) has made it a common cooking ingredient in Southeast Asia and the tropical belt of Africa. Its increasing use in the commercial food industry in other parts of the world is buoyed by its cheaper pricing, the high oxidative stability of the refined product, and high levels of natural antioxidants.

The oil palm originated in West Africa, but has since been planted successfully in tropical regions within 20 degrees of the equator. In the Republic of the Congo, or Congo Brazzaville, precisely in the Northern part, not far from Ouesso, local people produce this oil by hand. They harvest the fruit, boil it to let the water evaporate, then press what is left to collect the reddish-orange-colored oil.

In 1995, Malaysia was the world's largest producer, with a 51% of world share, but since 2007, Indonesia has been the world's largest producer, supplying approximately 50% of world palm oil volume.

Worldwide palm oil production for season 2011/2012 was 50.3 million metric tons (55.4 million short tons), increasing to 52.3 million metric tons (57.7 million short tons) for 2012/13. In 2010/2011, total production of palm kernels was 12.6 million metric tons (13.9 million short tons). In 2019 total production was 75.7 million metric tons (83.4 million short tons) E. guineensis is among the few tropical tree crops (along with bananas and citrus) with high productivity in actual growing conditions, i.e. outside of test plots.

The Urhobo people of Nigeria use the extract to make amiedi soup.

=== Social and environmental impacts ===
The social and environmental impact of oil palm cultivation is a highly controversial topic. Oil palm is a valuable economic crop and provides a major source of employment. It allows many small landholders to participate in the cash economy and often results in the upgrade of the infrastructure (schools, roads, telecommunications) within that area. According to the IBGE oil palm is a common crop in agroforestry practices in the Amazon. However, there are cases where native customary lands have been appropriated by oil palm plantations without any form of consultation or compensation, leading to social conflict between the plantations and local residents. In some cases, oil palm plantations are dependent on imported labour or illegal immigrants, with some concerns about the employment conditions and social impacts of these practices.

Biodiversity loss (including the potential extinction of charismatic species) is one of the most serious negative effects of oil palm cultivation. On the other hand, it also helps to push invasive species further, e.g. Anoplolepis gracilipes in southeast Asia. Large areas of already threatened tropical rainforest are often cleared to make way for palm oil plantations, especially in Southeast Asia, where enforcement of forest protection laws is lacking. In some states where oil palm is established, lax enforcement of environmental legislation leads to encroachment of plantations into protected areas, encroachment into riparian strips, open burning of plantation wastes, and release of palm mill pollutants such as palm oil mill effluent (POME) in the environment. Some of these states have recognised the need for increased environmental protection, resulting in more environment-friendly practices. Among those approaches is anaerobic treatment of POME, which can be a good source for biogas (methane) production and electricity generation. Anaerobic treatment of POME has been practiced in Malaysia and Indonesia. Like most wastewater sludge, anaerobic treatment of POME results in dominance of Methanosaeta concilii. It plays an important role in methane production from acetate, and the optimum condition for its growth should be considered to harvest biogas as renewable fuel.

Demand for palm oil has increased in recent years due to its use as a biofuel, but recognition that this increases the environmental impact of cultivation, as well as causing a food vs fuel issue, has forced some developed nations to reconsider their policies on biofuel to improve standards and ensure sustainability. However, critics point out that even companies signed up to the Roundtable on Sustainable Palm Oil continue to engage in environmentally damaging practices and that using palm oil as biofuel is perverse because it encourages the conversion of natural habitats such as forests and peatlands, releasing large quantities of greenhouse gases.

==== Carbon balance ====
Oil palm production has been documented as a cause of substantial and often irreversible damage to the natural environment. Its impacts include deforestation, habitat loss of critically endangered species, and a significant increase in greenhouse gas emissions.

The pollution is exacerbated because many rainforests in Indonesia and Malaysia lie atop peat bogs that store great quantities of carbon, which are released when the forests are cut down and the bogs are drained to make way for the plantations.

Environmental groups, such as Greenpeace, claim the deforestation caused by making way for oil palm plantations is far more damaging for the climate than the benefits gained by switching to biofuel. Fresh land clearances, especially in Borneo, are contentious for their environmental impact. Despite thousands of square kilometres of land standing unplanted in Indonesia, tropical hardwood forests are being cleared for palm oil plantations. Furthermore, as the remaining unprotected lowland forest dwindles, developers are looking to plant peat swamp land, using drainage that begins an oxidation process of the peat which can release 5,000 to 10,000 years worth of stored carbon. Drained peat is also at very high risk of forest fire. There is a clear record of fire being used to clear vegetation for oil palm development in Indonesia, where in recent years drought and man-made clearances have led to massive uncontrolled forest fires, covering parts of Southeast Asia in haze and leading to an international crisis with Malaysia. These fires have been blamed on a government with little ability to enforce its own laws, while impoverished small farmers and large plantation owners illegally burn and clear forests and peat lands to develop the land rather than reap the environmental benefits it could offer.

Many of the major companies in the vegetable oil economy participate in the Roundtable on Sustainable Palm Oil, which is trying to address this problem. For example, in 2008, Unilever, a member of the group, committed to use only oil palm oil which is certified as sustainable, by ensuring the large companies and smallholders that supply it convert to sustainable production by 2015.

Meanwhile, much of the recent investment in new palm plantations for biofuel has been funded through carbon credit projects through the Clean Development Mechanism; however, the reputational risk associated with the unsustainable palm plantations in Indonesia has now made many funds wary of such investment.

==== Palm biomass as fuel ====
Some scientists and companies are going beyond using just the oil, and are proposing to convert fronds, empty fruit bunches and palm kernel shells harvested from oil palm plantations into renewable electricity, cellulosic ethanol, biogas, biohydrogen and bioplastic. Thus, by using both the biomass from the plantation as well as the processing residues from palm oil production (fibers, kernel shells, palm oil mill effluent), bioenergy from palm plantations can have an effect on reducing greenhouse gas emissions. Examples of these production techniques have been registered as projects under the Kyoto Protocol's Clean Development Mechanism.

By using palm biomass to generate renewable energy, fuels and biodegradable products, both the energy balance and the greenhouse gas emissions balance for palm biodiesel is improved. For every tonne of palm oil produced from fresh fruit bunches, a farmer harvests around 6 tonnes of waste palm fronds, 1 tonne of palm trunks, 5 tonnes of empty fruit bunches, 1 tonne of press fiber (from the mesocarp of the fruit), half a tonne of palm kernel endocarp, 250 kg of palm kernel press cake, and 100 tonnes of palm oil mill effluent. Some oil palm plantations incinerate biomass to generate power for palm oil mills. Some other oil palm plantations yield large amount of biomass that can be recycled into medium density fibreboards and light furniture. In efforts to reduce greenhouse gas emissions, scientists treat palm oil mill effluent to extract biogas. After purification, biogas can substitute for natural gas for use at factories. Anaerobic treatment of palm oil mill effluent, practiced in Malaysia and Indonesia, results in domination of Methanosaeta concilii. It plays an important role in methane production from acetate and the optimum condition for its growth should be considered to harvest biogas as renewable fuel.

Unfortunately, the production of palm oil has detrimental effects on the environment and is not considered to be a sustainable biofuel. The deforestation occurring throughout Malaysia and Indonesia as a result of the growing demand for this plant has made scarce natural habitats for orangutans and other rainforest dwellers. More carbon is released during the life cycle of a palm oil plant to its use as a biofuel than is emitted by the same volume of fossil fuels.

In July 2024, Hong Wai Onn from the Research Institute for Sustainable Excellence and Leadership asserted that the European Union's classification of palm oil as a high indirect land use change (ILUC) risk biofuel is flawed. He called for a reevaluation of ILUC factors to ensure more accurate carbon intensity measurements. He argued that ignoring this issue unfairly limits palm oil's potential as a low ILUC-risk biofuel and its role in supporting global climate efforts.

== See also ==
- Energy and the environment
- Journal of Oil Palm Research
- Journal of Plantation Crops
- Malaysian Palm Oil Board
- Social and environmental impact of palm oil
