= Disease resistance breeding =

Disease resistance breeding is the process of selective breeding to produce or improve disease resistance. It is also used more generally for breeding for disease tolerance.

Types include:

- Plant breeding for disease resistance

- Apple scab § Resistance breeding programs

- Other examples of Selective breeding in other organisms
