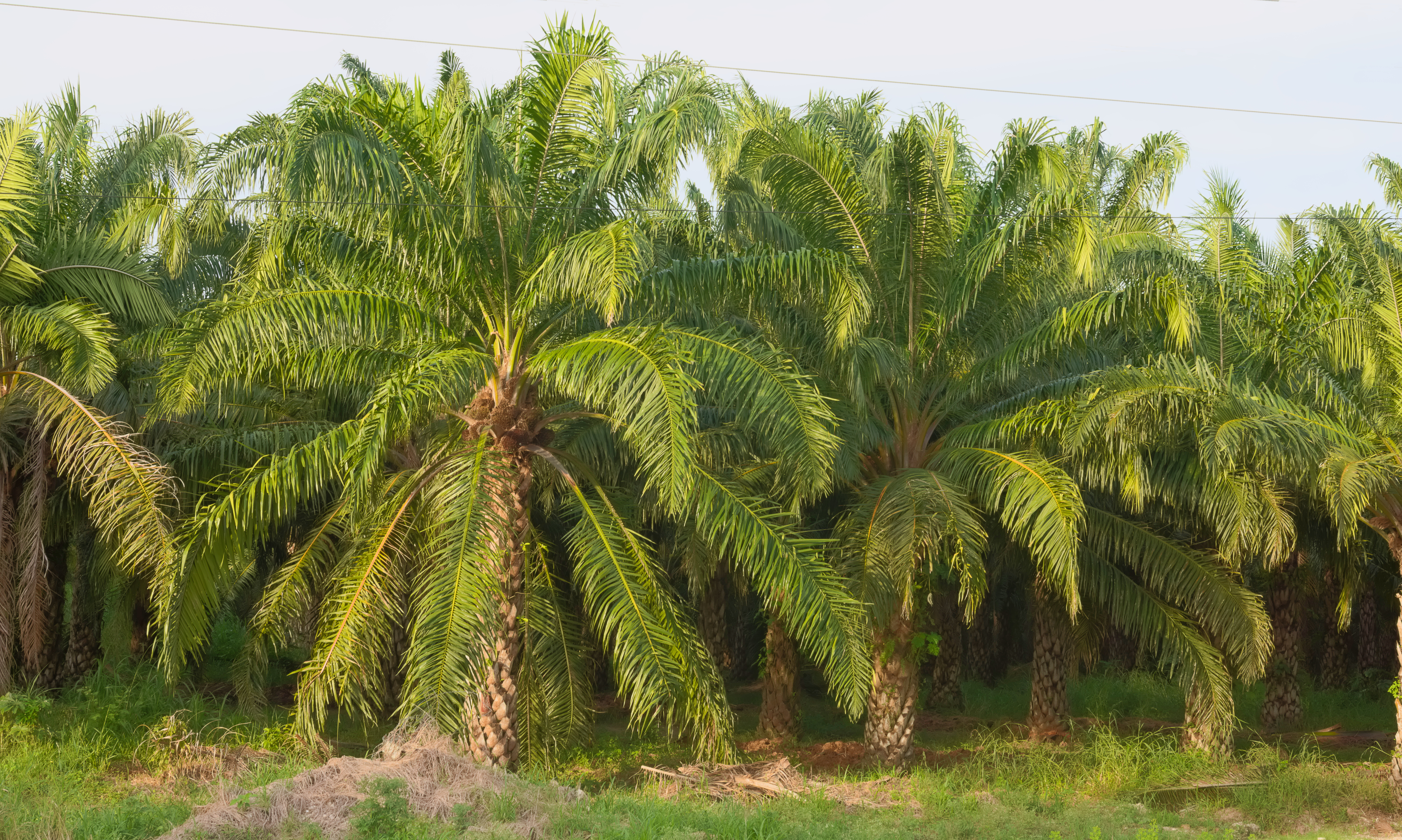
- American oil palm (Elaeis oleifera)

Scientific classification
- Kingdom: Plantae
- Clade: Tracheophytes
- Clade: Angiosperms
- Clade: Monocots
- Clade: Commelinids
- Order: Arecales
- Family: Arecaceae
- Genus: Elaeis
- Species: E. oleifera

Binomial name
- Elaeis oleifera (Kunth) Cortés

Synonyms
- Alfonsia oleifera Kunth; Corozo oleifera (Kunth) L.H.Bailey; Elaeis melanococca Mart. nom. illeg.

= Elaeis oleifera =

American oil palm

Species of plant

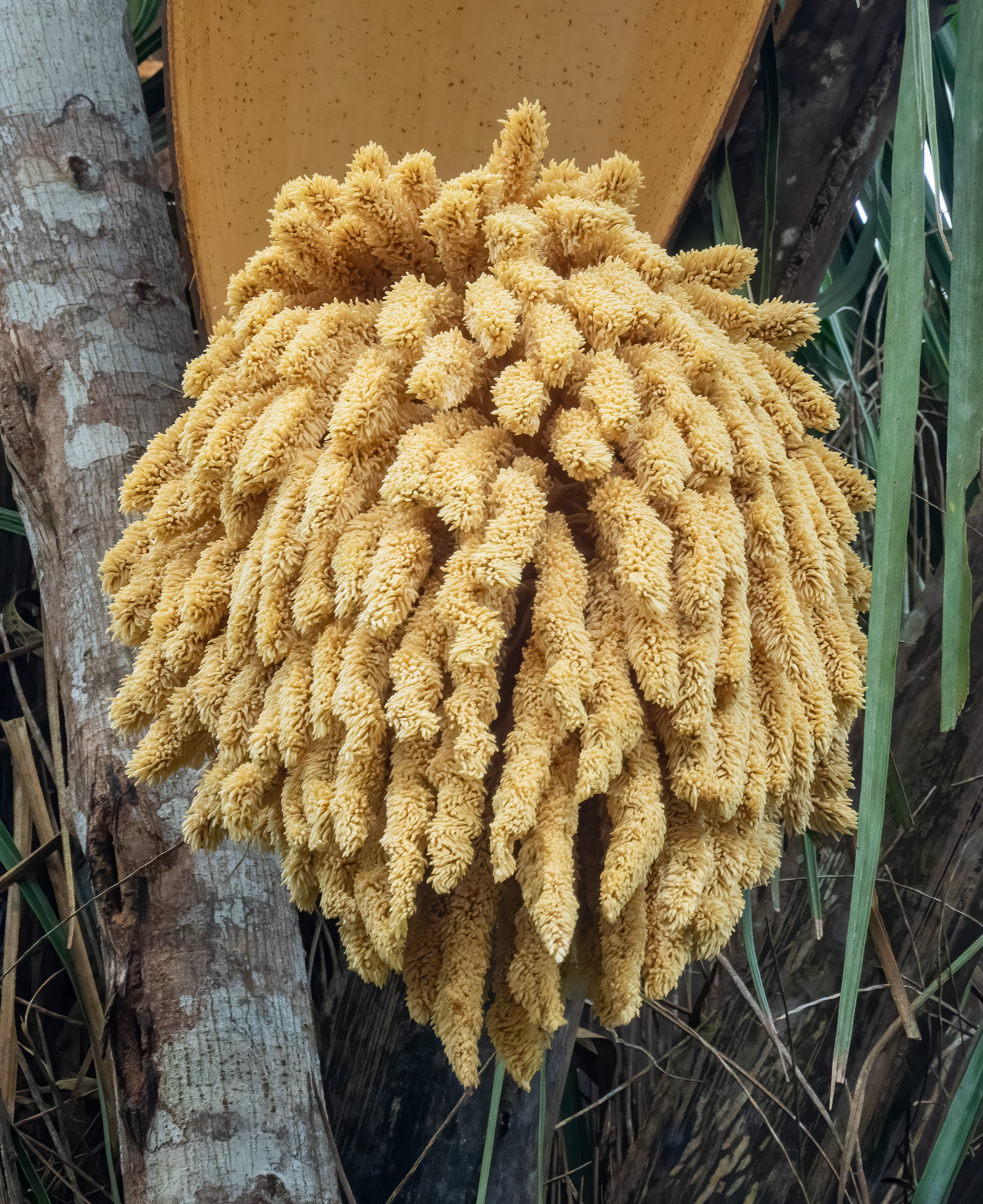
E. oleifera inflorescence

Elaeis oleifera is a species of palm commonly called the American oil palm. It is native to South and Central America from Honduras to northern Brazil.

Unlike its relative Elaeis guineensis, the African oil palm, it is rarely planted commercially to produce palm oil, but hybrids between the two species are, mainly in efforts to provide disease resistance and to increase the proportion of unsaturated fatty acids in the oil.
