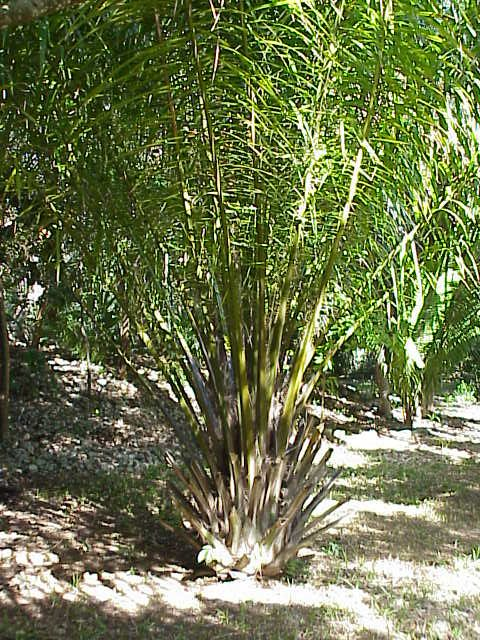
- African oil palm (Elaeis guineensis)

Scientific classification
- Kingdom: Plantae
- Clade: Tracheophytes
- Clade: Angiosperms
- Clade: Monocots
- Clade: Commelinids
- Order: Arecales
- Family: Arecaceae
- Subfamily: Arecoideae
- Tribe: Cocoseae
- Genus: Elaeis; Jacq.

Species
- Elaeis guineensis Jacq.; Elaeis oleifera (Kunth) Cortés

Synonyms
- Corozo Jacq. ex Giseke; Alfonsia Kunth

= Elaeis =

Oil palms, genus

Elaeis (from Greek 'oil') is a genus of palms, called oil palms, containing two species, native to Africa and the Americas. They are used in commercial agriculture in the production of palm oil.

== Description ==
Mature palms are single-stemmed, and can grow well over 20 m (66 ft) tall. The leaves are pinnate, and reach between 3–5 m (10–16 ft) long. The flowers are produced in dense clusters; each individual flower is small, with three sepals and three petals.

The palm fruit is reddish, about the size of a large plum, and grows in large bunches. Each fruit is made up of an oily, fleshy outer layer (the pericarp), with a single seed (the palm kernel), also rich in oil.

== Species ==
The two species, E. guineensis (Africa) and E. oleifera (Americas) can produce fertile hybrids. The genome of E. guineensis has been sequenced, which has important implications for breeding improved strains of the crop plants.

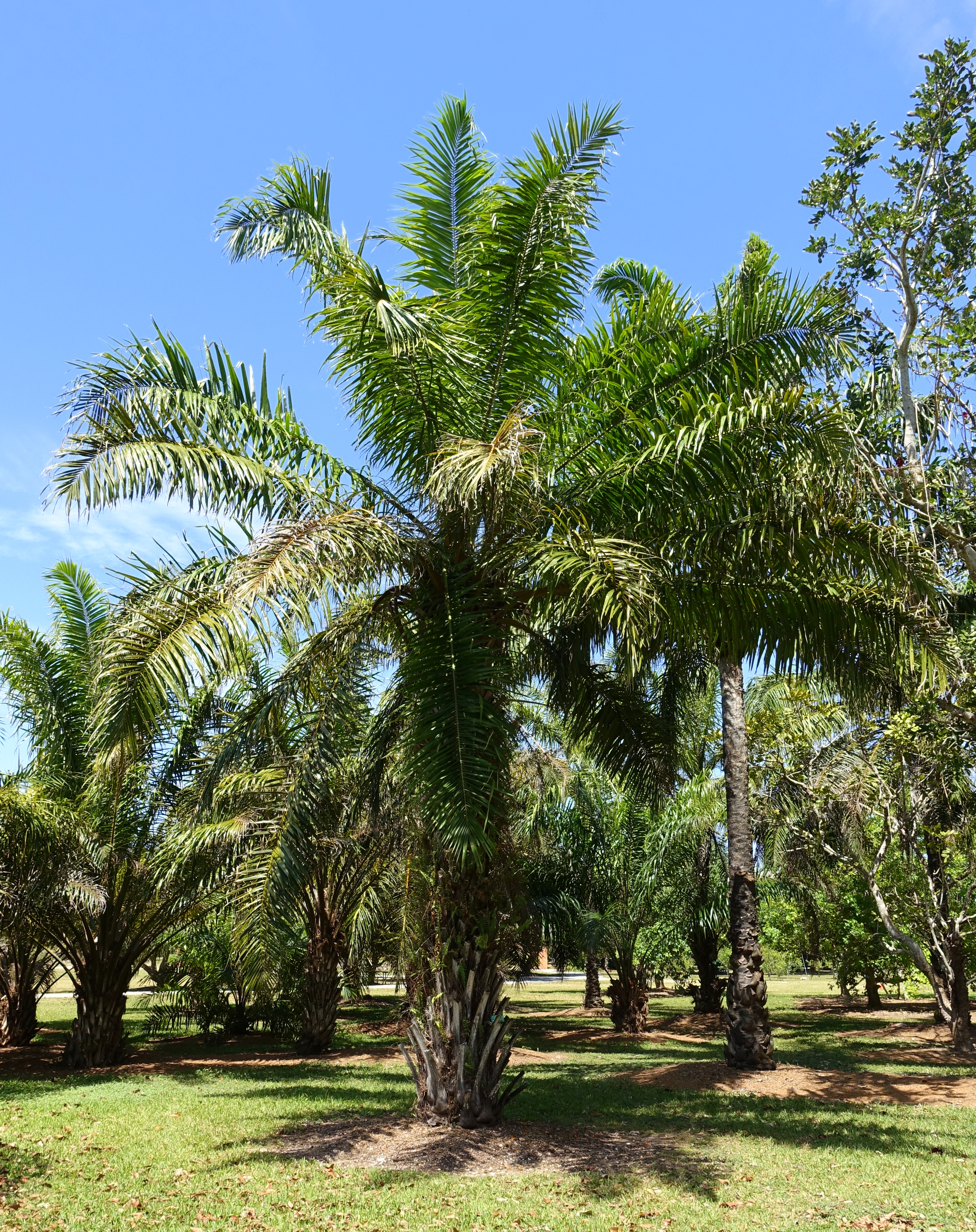
E. guineensis (Africa)

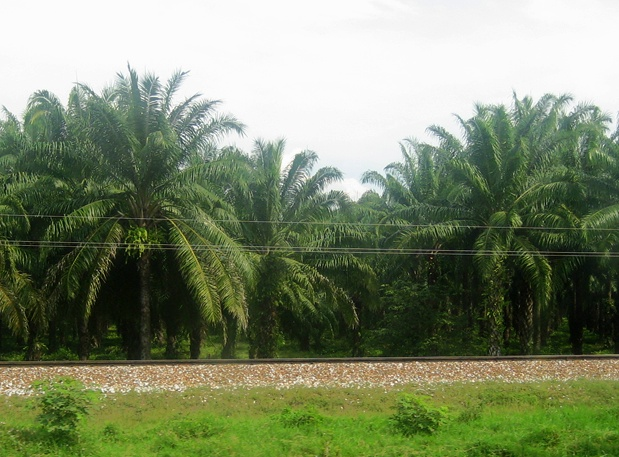
E. oleifera (Central and South America)

== Distribution and habitat ==
E. guineensis is native to west and southwest Africa, occurring between Angola and Gambia. The American oil palm, E. oleifera (from Latin oleifer 'oil-producing'), is native to tropical Central and South America from Honduras to northern Brazil, and is used locally for oil production.

== Uses ==
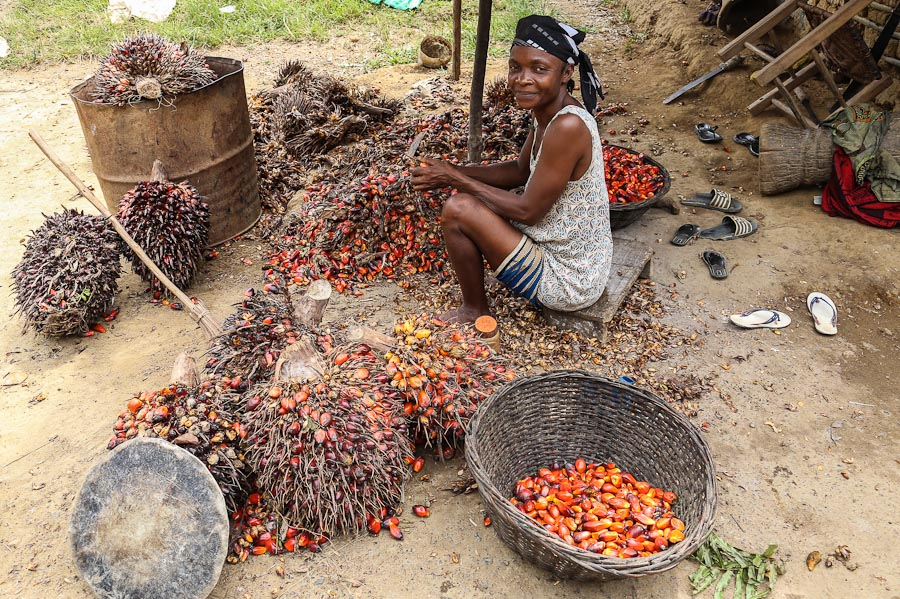
Harvesting in Liberia

=== Commercial palm oil cultivation ===
Since palm oil contains more saturated fats than oils made from rapeseed, corn, linseed, soybeans, safflower, and sunflowers, it can withstand extreme deep-frying heat and resists oxidation. It contains no trans fat, and its use in food has increased as food-labelling laws have changed to specify trans fat content. Oil from Elaeis guineensis is also used as biofuel.

Human use of oil palms may date back to about 5,000 years in coastal west Africa. Palm oil was also discovered in the late 19th century by archaeologists in a tomb at Abydos dating back to 3000 BCE. It is thought that Arab traders brought the oil palm to Egypt.

Elaeis guineensis is now extensively cultivated in tropical countries outside Africa, particularly Malaysia and Indonesia which together produce most of the world supply, as well as domestically in the Americas.

==== Controversy ====
Palm oil is typically considered the most controversial of the cooking oils – for political, health, and environmental reasons. Palm oil plantations are under increasing scrutiny for social and environmental harm, particularly because rainforests with high biodiversity are destroyed, greenhouse gas output is increased, and because people are displaced by palm-oil enterprises and traditional livelihoods are negatively impacted. Especially in Indonesia, there is also growing pressure for palm oil producers to prove that they are not harming rare animals in the cultivation process.

In 2018, a Christmas TV advertisement by UK supermarket chain Iceland Foods Ltd, produced by Greenpeace, was banned by the UK advertising watchdog Clearcast, as it was deemed too political. This was an animated short, starring a fictional orangutan named Rang-tan produced to raise awareness of the environmental impact of the production of palm oil, and the dangers orangutans face as a result. Iceland Foods had committed to banning palm oil from its own-brand products by the end of 2018.

Almost all wildlife declines in both diversity and abundance in oil palm plantations.

=== Fiber ===
Elaeis was found to be a cheap source of nanofiber by Fahma et al. 2010. It is especially suited to production in Indonesia where cellulosic waste is already an abundant byproduct.

== See also ==
- Attalea maripa, another oil-producing palm
- Energy and the environment
- Journal of Oil Palm Research
- List of Arecaceae genera
- Social and environmental impact of palm oil
