= Palm kernel =

Edible seed of the oil palm fruit

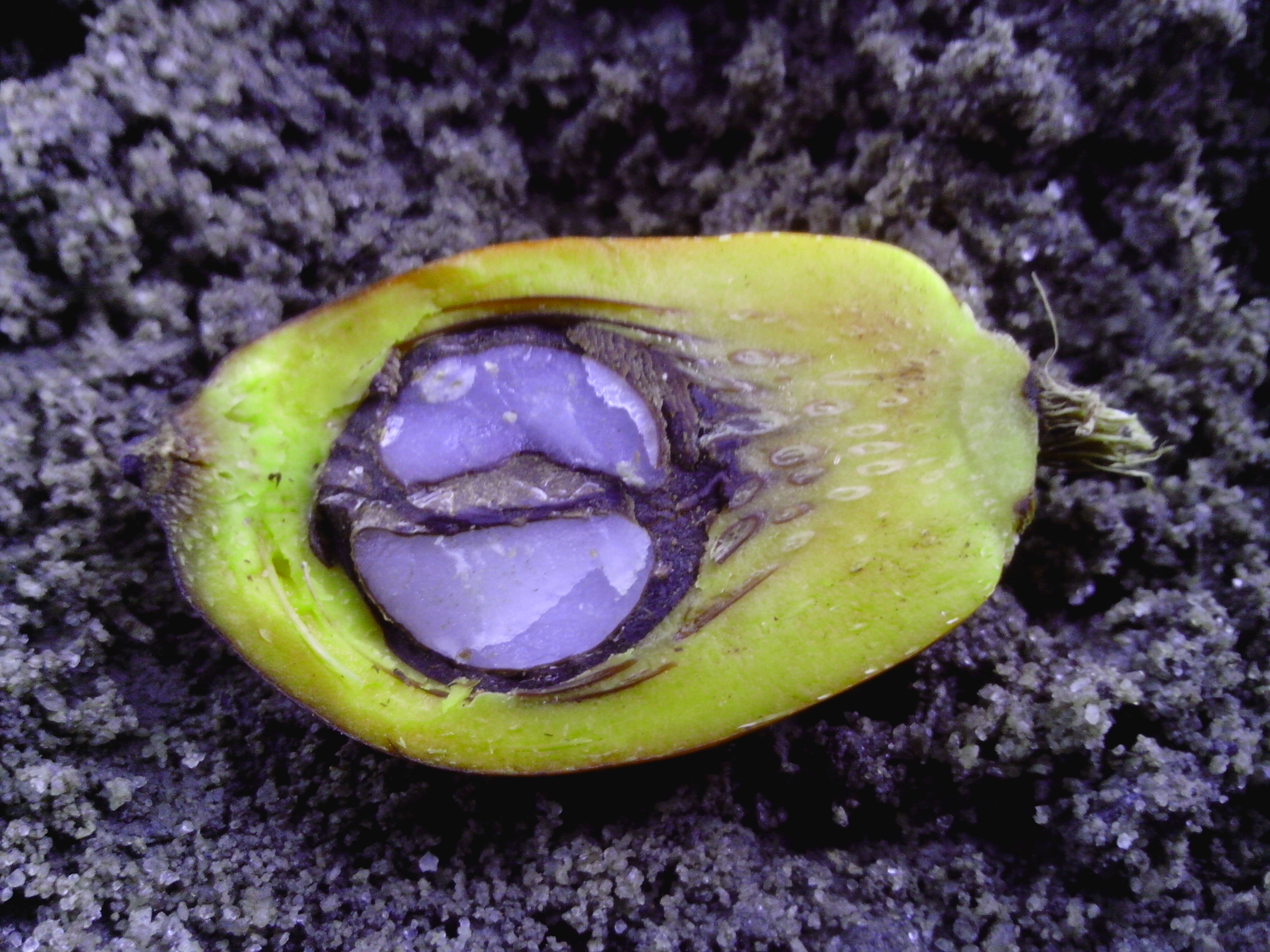
Palm kernel within a palm fruit

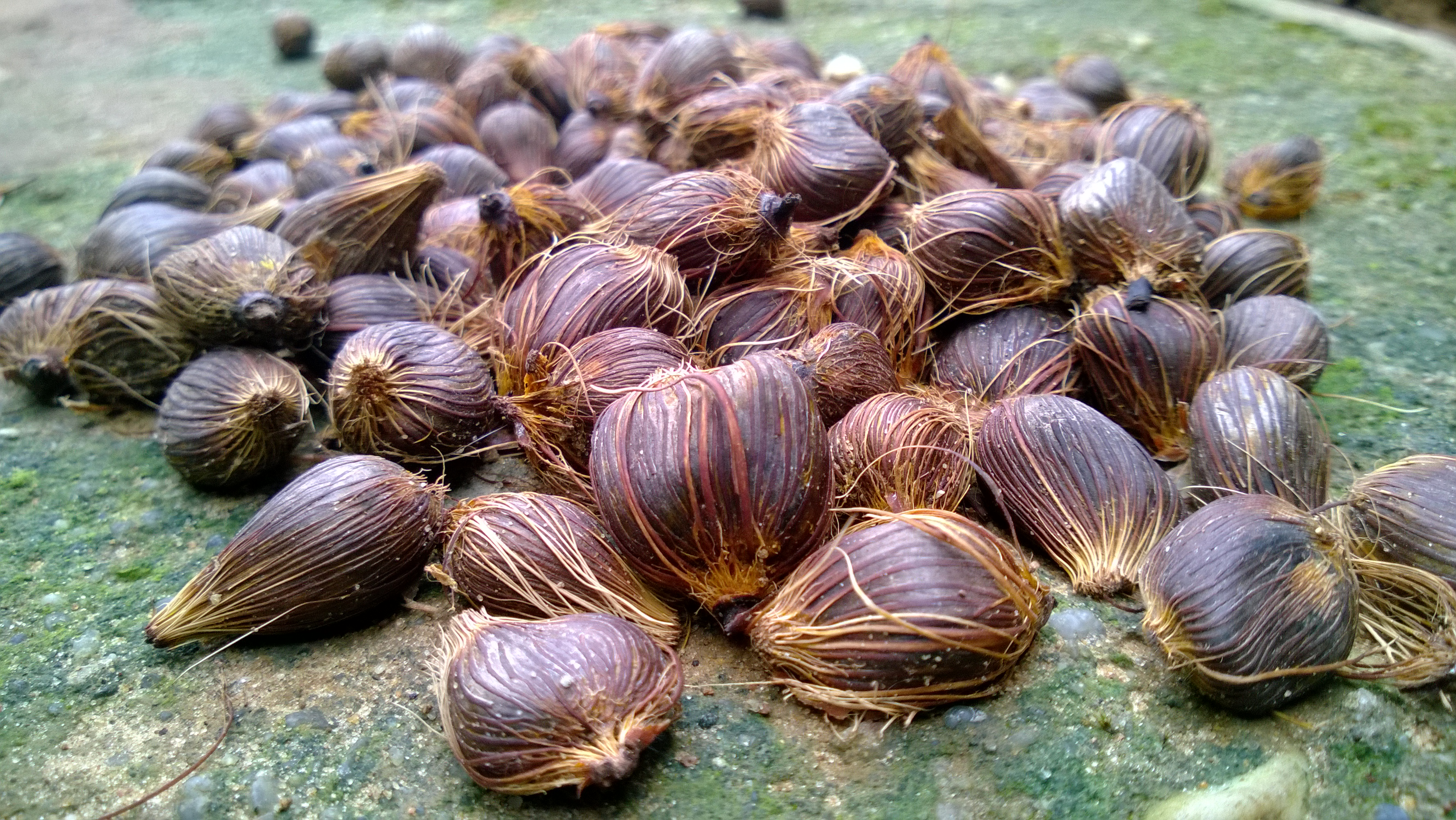
Palm kernel nuts put out to dry

The palm kernel is the edible seed of the oil palm fruit. The fruit yields two distinct oils: palm oil derived from the outer parts of the fruit, and palm kernel oil derived from the kernel.

The pulp left after oil is rendered from the kernel is formed into "palm kernel cake", used either as high-protein feed for dairy cattle or burned in boilers to generate electricity for palm oil mills and surrounding villages.

== Uses ==
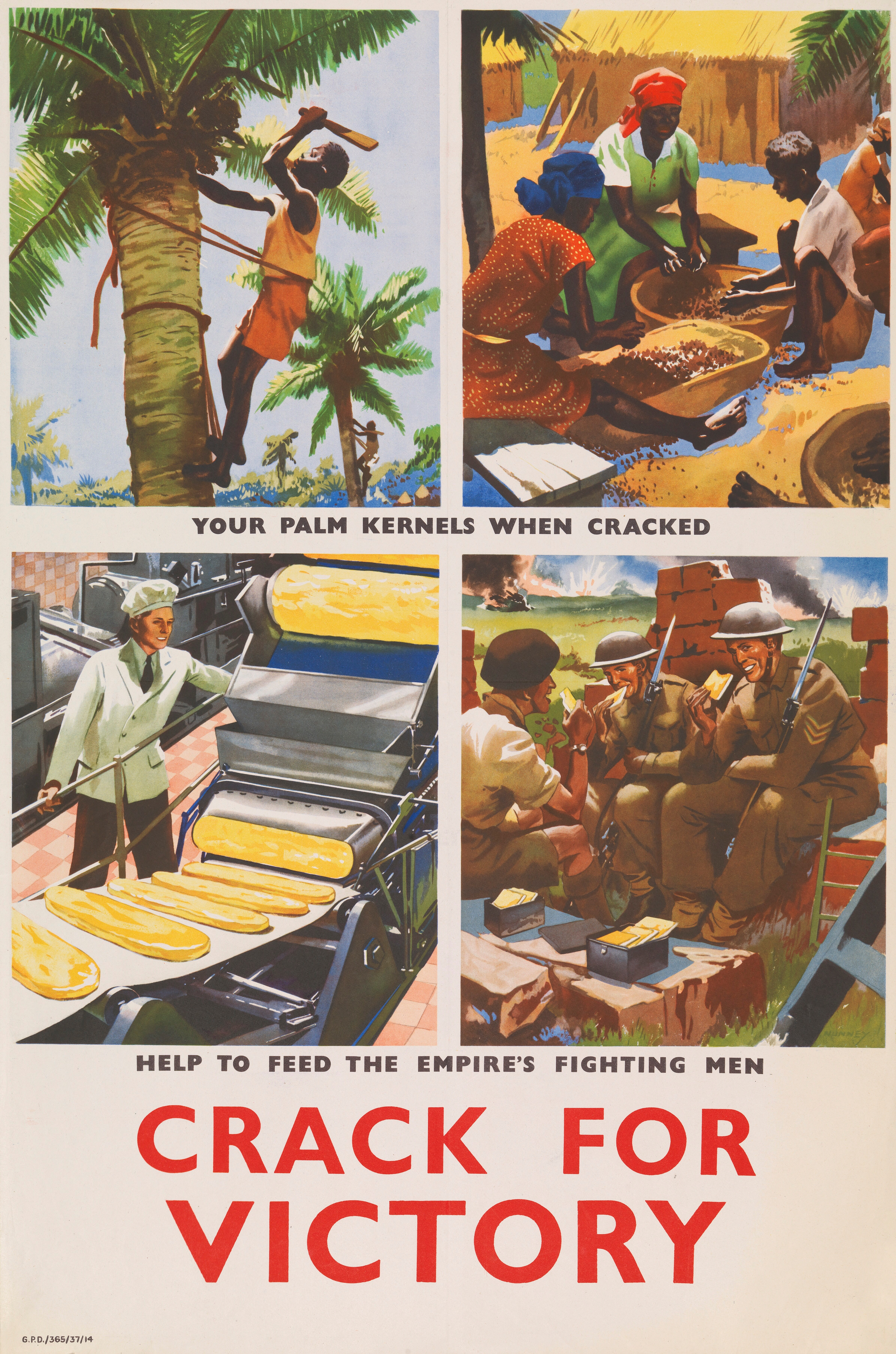
World War II British Empire palm kernel poster

Palm kernel cake is most commonly produced by economical screw press, less frequently via more expensive solvent extraction.

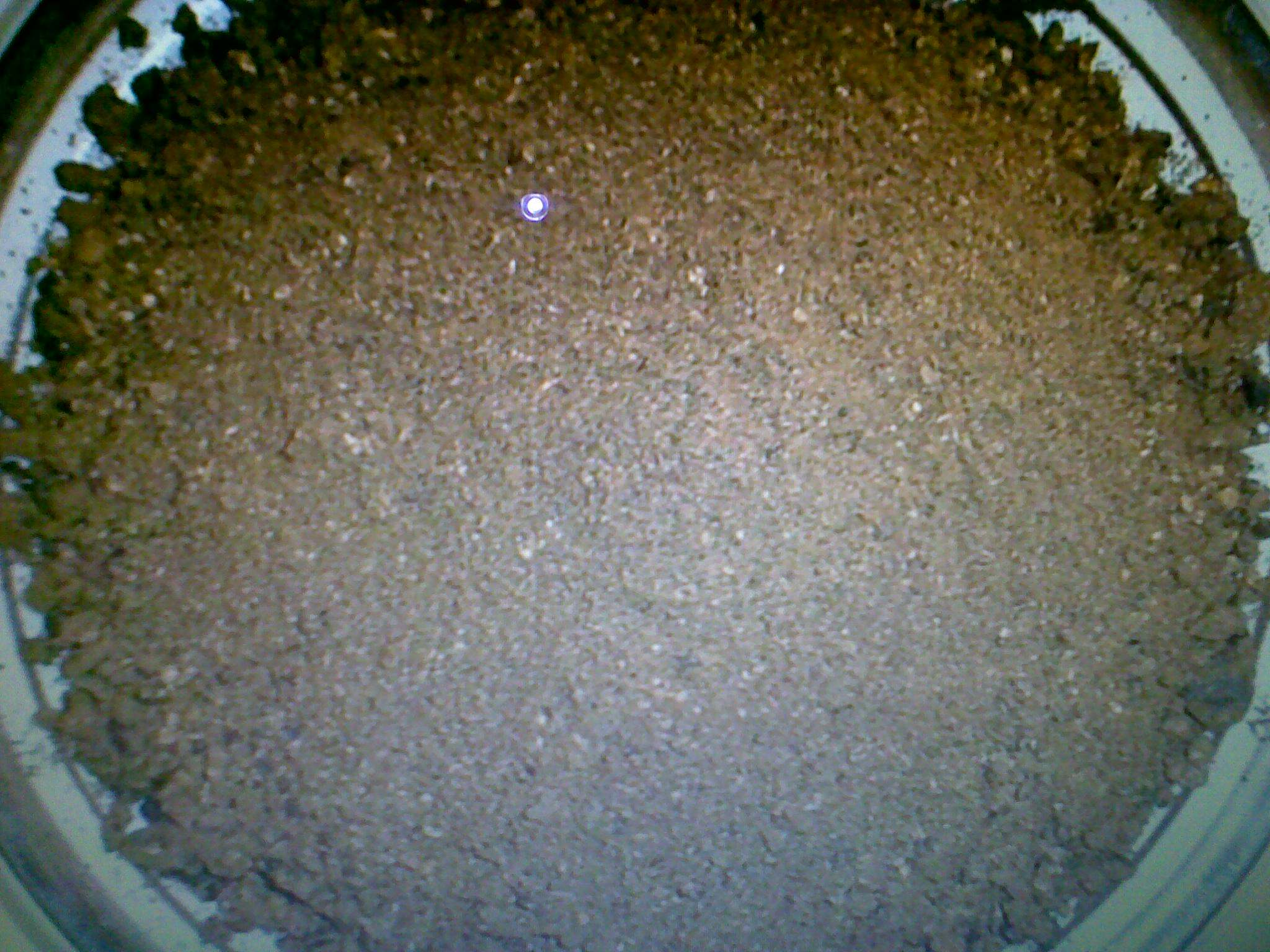
Palm kernel cake

Palm kernel cake is a high-fibre, medium-grade protein feed best suited to ruminants. Among other similar fodders, palm kernel cake is ranked a little higher than copra cake and cocoa pod husk, but lower than fish meal and groundnut cake, especially in its protein value.

Composed of 16% fiber, palm kernel cake also has a high phosphorus-to-calcium ratio and contains such essential elements as magnesium, iron, and zinc. The typical ration formulated for the feeding of dairy cattle consists of palm kernel cake (50%), molasses (5%), grass/hay (42%), limestone (1.5%), mineral premix (1%), and salt (0.5%), with trace element/vitamin premix.

Palm kernel shells (PKS), a byproduct of palm kernel oil production, can be used for biofuel (for example, in the form of pellets).

== See also ==
- Palm kernel oil
- Tropical agriculture
- Environmental issues with agriculture
- Social and environmental impact of palm oil
