= Journal of Oil Palm Research =

- Discipline: Agronomy, oleochemistry
- Language: English
- Edited by: Dr. Ahmad Parveez Ghulam Kadir

Publication details
- Former name: Elaeis
- History: 1989-present
- Publisher: Malaysia Palm Oil Board (Malaysia)
- Frequency: Quarterly
- Open access: Yes
- Impact factor: 1.564 (2019)

Standard abbreviations
- ISO 4: J. Oil Palm Res.

Indexing
- ISSN: 1511-2780
- OCLC no.: 40938920

Links
- Journal homepage

The Journal of Oil Palm Research (formerly known as Elaeis: The International Journal of Oil Palm Research and Development) is a quarterly peer-reviewed open-access scientific journal covering research on palm oil fats, oils, and oleo-chemistry. It is published by the Malaysian Palm Oil Board and the editor-in-chief is Dr. Ahmad Parveez Ghulam Kadir (Malaysian Palm Oil Board). According to the Journal Citation Reports, the journal has a 1.564 impact factor for 2019.

== See also ==
- Augustine Ong, founding editor-in-chief, Elaeis
