= Malaysian Palm Oil Board =

Government agency in Malaysia

Malaysian Palm Oil Board (MPOB)
- Lembaga Minyak Sawit Malaysia

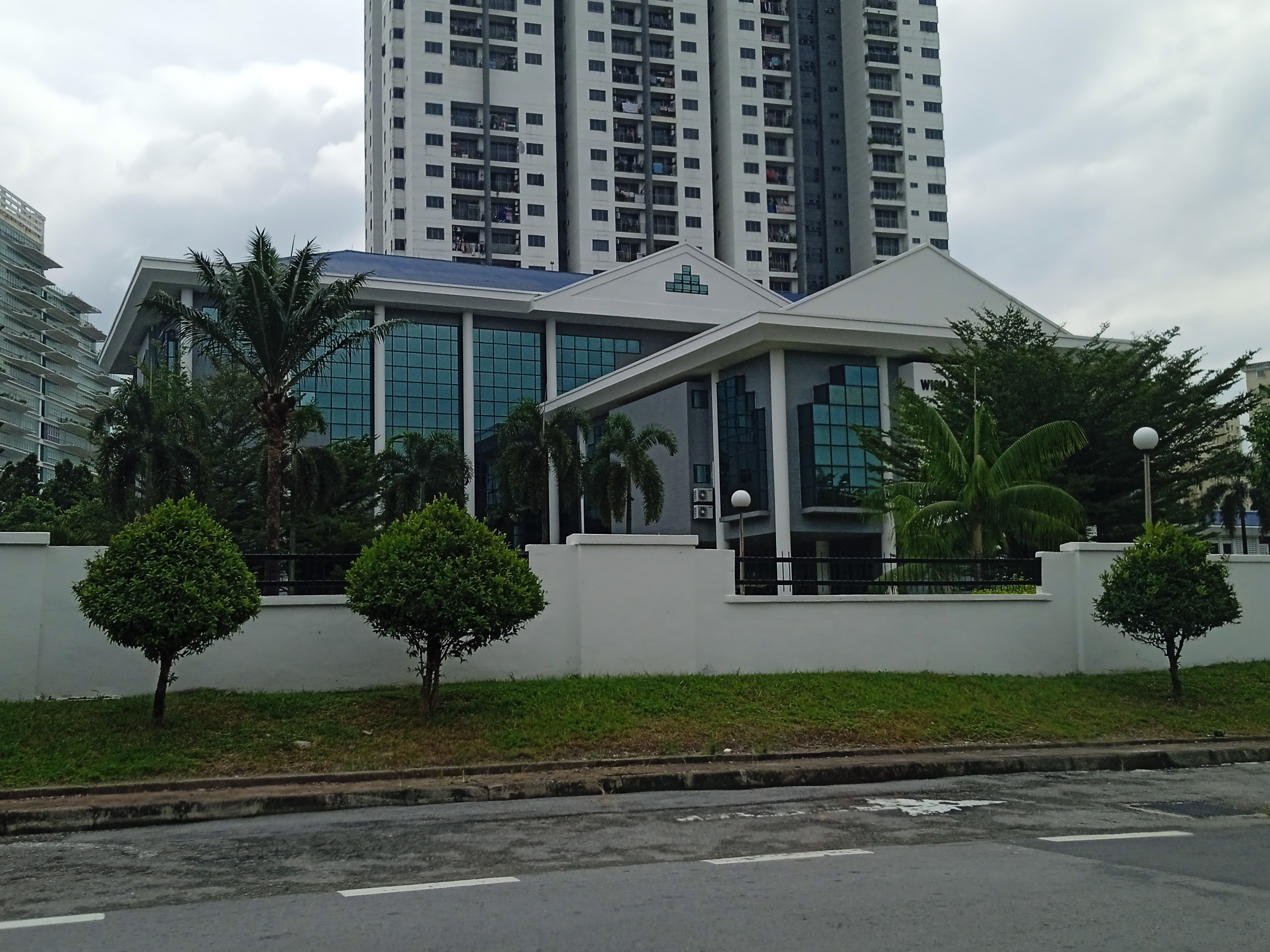

Agency overview
- Formed: 1 May 2000; 26 years ago
- Preceding agencies: Palm Oil Research Institute of Malaysia; Palm Oil Registration and Licensing Authority
- Jurisdiction: Government of Malaysia
- Headquarters: Bandar Baru Bangi, Selangor
- Minister responsible: Johari Abdul Ghani, Minister of Plantation and Commodities (Malaysia)
- Deputy Minister responsible: Chan Foong Hin, Deputy Minister of Plantation and Commodities (Malaysia)
- Agency executives: Mohamad Helmy Othman Basha, Chairman; Ahmad Parveez Ghulam Kadir, Director General
- Parent department: Ministry of Plantation and Commodities
- Website: www.mpob.gov.my

The Malaysian Palm Oil Board (Malay: Lembaga Minyak Sawit Malaysia), abbreviated MPOB, is a government agency responsible for the promotion and development of the palm oil industry in Malaysia. It is one of the agencies under the Ministry of Plantation Industries and Commodities.

== Formation ==
The Malaysian Palm Oil Board (MPOB) was established in 1998 with the passing of the Malaysian Palm Oil Board Act, which led to the merger of two pre-existing agencies, the Palm Oil Research Institute of Malaysia (PORIM) and the Palm Oil Registration and Licensing Authority (PORLA). The resulting organisation was named the Malaysian Palm Oil Board and officially began operations on 1 May 2000. The first Director-General of the MPOB was Yusof Basiron who served until 2006.

Sime Darby Plantations' managing director, Mohd Bakke Salleh, was appointed as chairman of the industry regulator and research body for a two-year term effective 31 July 2018.

== Overview ==
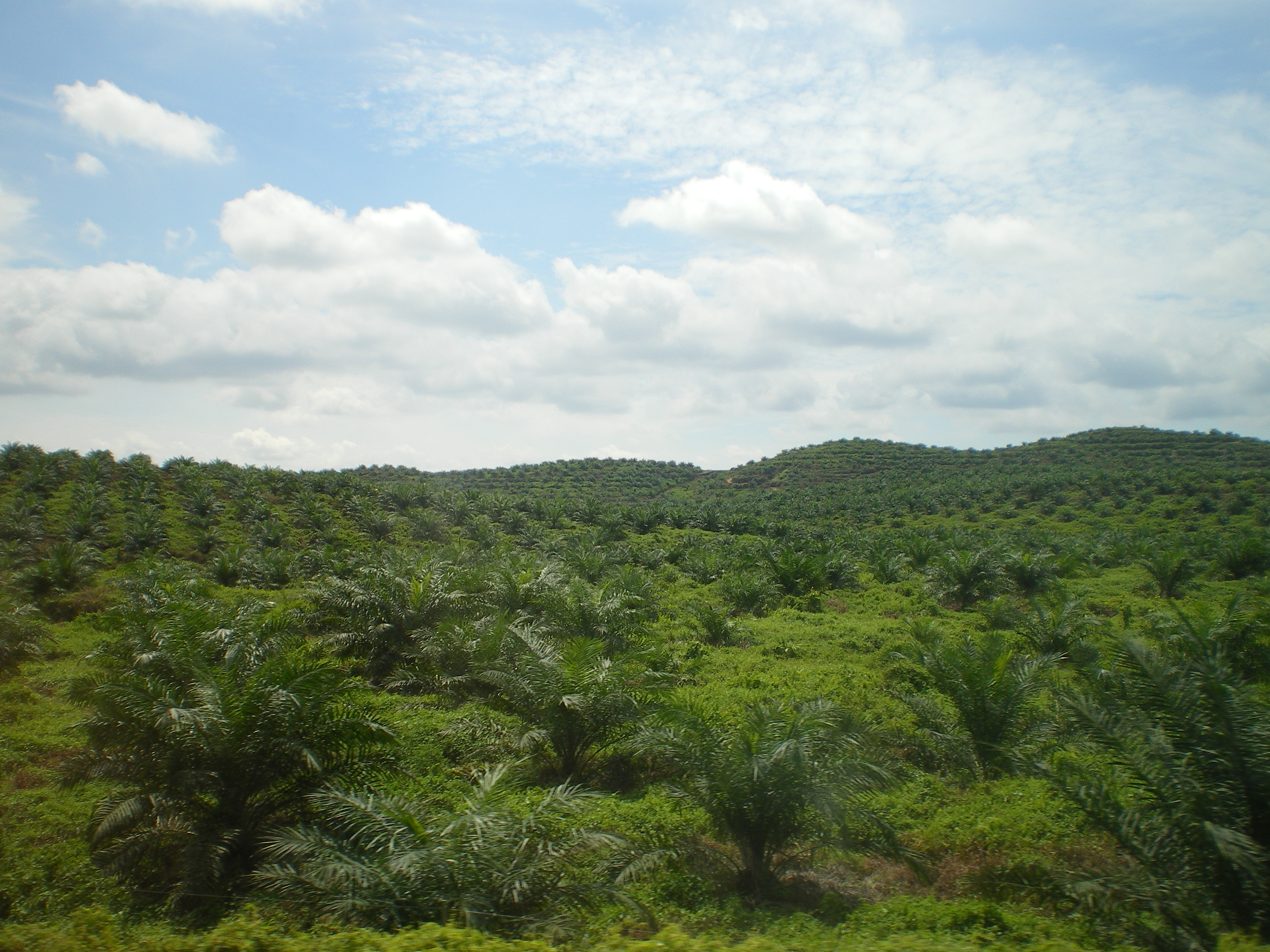
Young oil palm plantation in East Malaysia, 2010

The MPOB is an agency of the Ministry of Plantation Industries and Commodities and is funded by palm oil industry taxes and through government grants for research. The current chairman is Shahrir bin Abdul Samad, and the director general is Choo Yuen May. According to the organisation's official website, the MPOB is headquartered in Bandar Baru Bangi and operates additional offices both within Malaysia and abroad, including offices in China, Brussels, Pakistan, the United States and Egypt. The MPOB requires all businesses involved in the palm oil industry to be licensed through the organisation.

The organisation's activities include research, publication, development and implementation of regulations and the promotion of the palm oil industry in Malaysia. The MPOB oversees all stages of palm oil production in Malaysia, from planting to exporting. It publishes several journals, including the Journal of Oil Palm Research.

The MPOB also oversees the Tropical Peat Research Institute, an organisation that conducts research into the effects of planting oil palm on peat land.

In 2012 and 2013, the MPOB has focused on supporting palm oil smallholders by making available funds and additional services for palm oil producers with fewer than 2.5 hectare of land. These growers are eligible for government assistance intended to help smaller producers compete with larger plantations.

== Research and development ==
The MPOB supports the development of new products including biodiesel and alternate uses for palm biomass, the organic waste produced when processing oil palm trees. The research into biomass has led to the development of wood and paper products, fertilisers, bioenergy sources, polyethylene sheeting for use in vehicles and other products made of palm biomass.

The MPOB has worked in partnership with several universities on research and development projects, including a project with Beijing University that developed animal feed using oil palm kernels. The organisation has also partnered with the University of London and Copenhagen University. In 2009, the MPOB pledged to increase their partnerships with private sector businesses, announcing partnerships with Sime Darby and the Genting Group's research department. Since then the MPOB has also announced research partnerships with WarisNove, C.H.E. Metal Works and Nippon Palm Corporation.

== See also ==
- Palm oil production in Malaysia
- Government of Malaysia
- Palm oil
- Palm kernel oil
- Social and environmental impact of palm oil
