= Palm oil production in Malaysia =

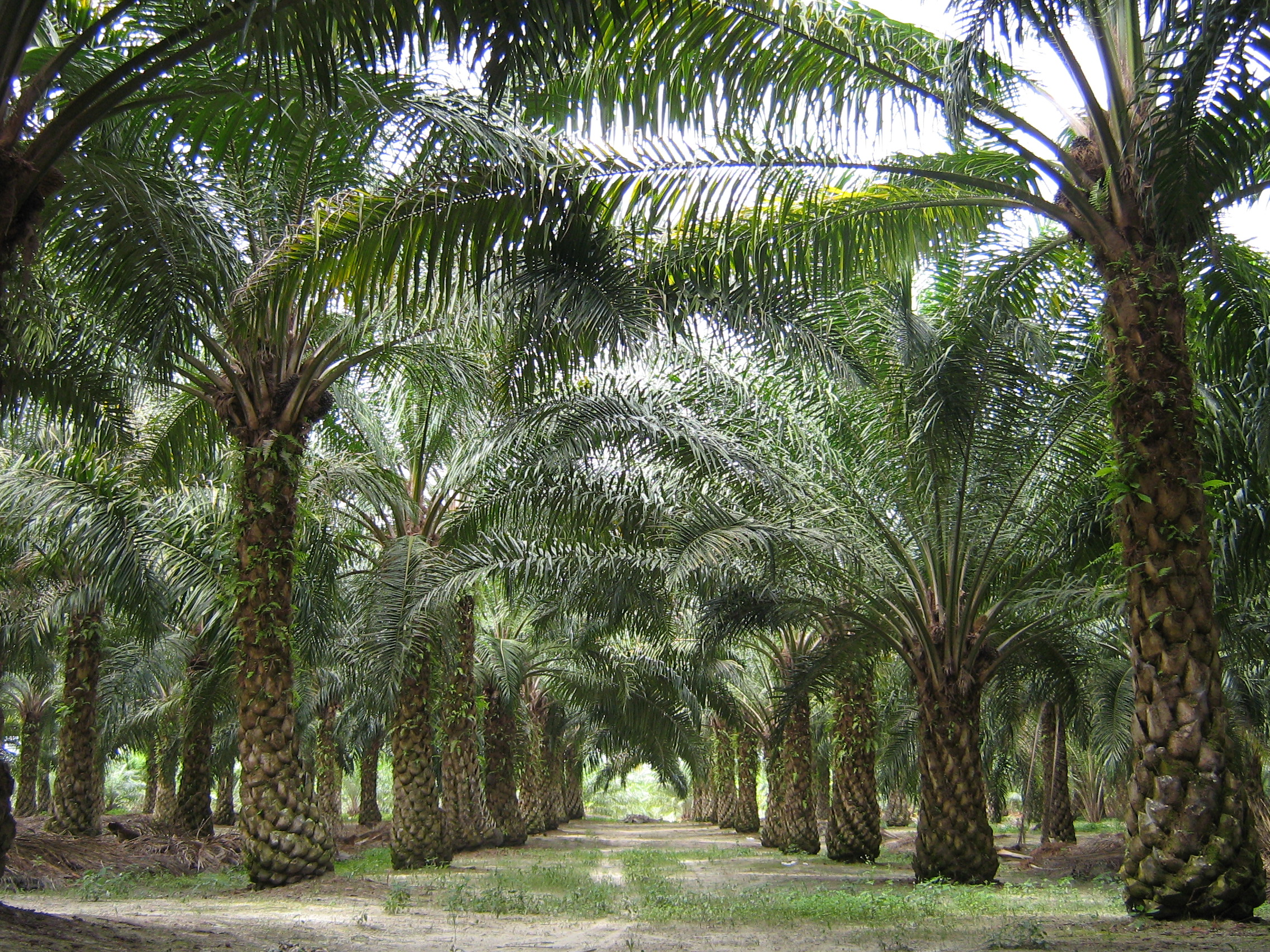
A mature oil palm plantation in Malaysia (2007)

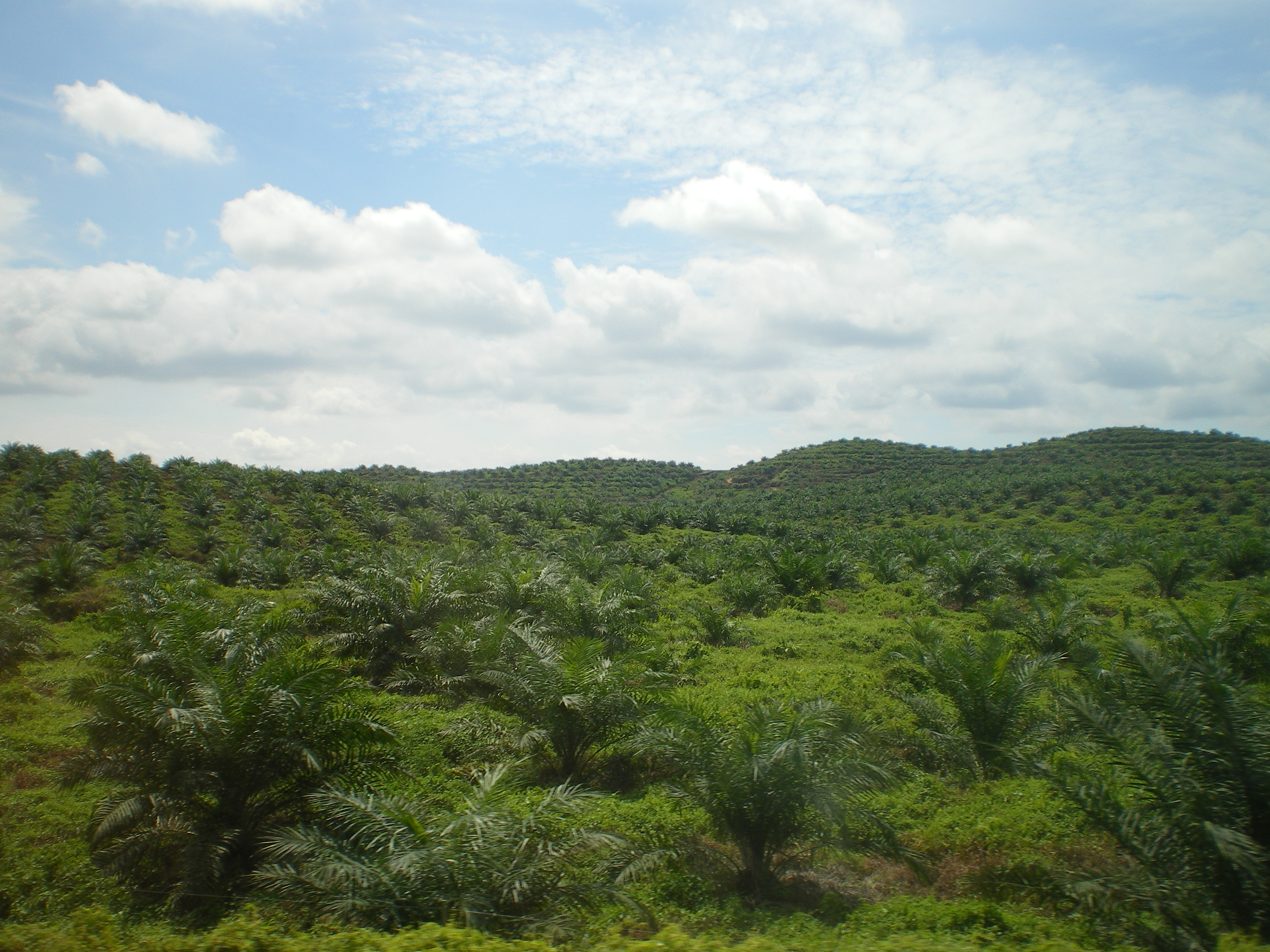
New oil palm plantation in East Malaysia (2010)

Palm oil production is vital for the economy of Malaysia, which is the world's second-largest producer of the commodity after Indonesia. The Malaysian Palm Oil Board (MPOB) is a government agency responsible for the promotion and development of the palm oil sector in the country. The country's palm oil industry produces about 90 million tonnes of lignocellulosic biomass, including empty fruit bunches, oil palm trunks, and oil palm fronds, as well as palm oil mill effluent (POME). In 2010, in response to concerns about the social and environmental impact of palm oil, the Malaysian government pledged to limit palm oil plantation expansion by retaining at least half of the nation's land as forest cover.

== History ==
=== British Malaya ===
Palm oil trees were introduced to British Malaya by the British government in early 1870s as ornament plants from Eastern Region and The Oil River Protectorate, Nigeria, West Africa. The first commercial palm oil cultivation was done in Selangor in 1917 at Tennamaran Estate.

=== Malaysia ===
In the early 1960s, palm oil cultivation increased significantly under the government diversification program to reduce Malaysia's dependency on rubber and tin. The FELDA land settlement schemes were introduced surrounding most of the palm oil plantation fields to eradicate poverty among the local people. In the same period, Malaysia also became the world's largest palm oil exporter. World Bank policies in the 1970s encouraged palm oil expansion and the IMF's bailout package, following the 1998 economic crisis, incentivised the expansion of palm plantations. In the 1980s, the government nationalized three major palm oil companies, which were Guthrie, Golden Hope and Sime Darby.

Palm oil plantation area in Malaysia by year (1975-2012)
Year	Plantation area (million hectares)	Percentage over total land area in Malaysia
1975	0.64	1.9%
1980	1.02	3.1%
1985	1.48	4.5%
1990	2.03	6.1%
1995	2.54	7.7%
2000	3.37	10.2%
2005	4.05	12.2%
2012	5.10	15.4%

=== Tensions with the EU ===
In March 2019, the European Commission concluded that palm oil cultivation results in excessive deforestation and its use in transport fuel should be phased out by 2030. In response, Mahathir alleged that the European Union is at risk of starting a trade war with Malaysia regarding its "grossly unfair" policies geared towards decreasing the use of palm oil, which Mahathir stated was "unfair" and an example of "rich people ... try to impoverish poor people".

=== Export issues with India ===
India, the world's biggest buyer of edible, effectively banned imports of refined palm oil from Malaysia. This move came after New Delhi objected to Malaysian PM Mahathir's criticism of India's new citizenship law of 2019, which is perceived to be targeting Muslims. Reuters reported that India had informally instructed traders to stay away from Malaysian palm oil. Indian traders are instead buying Indonesian crude palm oil at a premium of $10 tonne over Malaysian prices. But, Mahathir was unrelenting, saying "We are concerned of course because we sell a lot of palm oil to India, but on the other hand we need to be frank and see that if something goes wrong, we will have to say it."

=== Labour exploitation ===
In late December 2020, the United States Customs and Border Protection (CBP) issued a "withhold release order" banning the importation of palm oil into the United States produced by Sime Darby following a months-long investigation into forced labour on Sime Darby–owned plantations. The US ban on Sime Darby followed a similar US ban on palm oil company FGV Holdings over forced labour allegations. The ban can be lifted if remedial action is taken. According to the CBP, Malaysia accounted for 31% (roughly US$410 million) of the United States' palm oil imports during the 2020 fiscal year.

== Area ==
As of 2016, palm oil plantation accounted for a total land use of 57,400 km^{2} in Malaysia.

Palm oil plantation area in Malaysia by state (2016)
State	Plantation area (hectares)	Percentage of total plantation area	Percentage of state area
Sabah	1,551,714	27.0%	21.1%
Sarawak	1,506,769	26.3%	12.1%
Johor	745,630	13.0%	38.8%
Pahang	732,052	12.8%	20.3%
Perak	397,908	6.9%	18.9%
Negeri Sembilan	178,958	3.1%	26.8%
Terengganu	171,943	3.0%	13.2%
Kelantan	155,458	2.7%	10.3%
Selangor	138,831	2.4%	17.1%
Kedah	87,786	1.5%	33.7%
Melaka	56,149	1.0%	13.5%
Penang	14,135	0.2%	9.2%
Perlis	652	0.0%	0.8%

== Economics ==
In 2012, the Malaysian palm oil industry employed an estimated 491,000 workers.

Malaysia's Sime Darby is the largest listed palm oil company globally, based on plantation area and fresh fruit bunch production. The company was created through a Malaysian government initiated merger in December 2006. The world's second-largest oil palm plantation company, Felda Global Ventures Holdings (FGV), is also based in Malaysia. Felda Global Ventures Holdings is the world's third largest palm oil company by planted acreage, controlling over 850,000 ha of land in the country, including approximately 500,000 ha that it leases and manages for smallholders.

== Research institutions ==
In the 1960s, research and development (R&D) in oil palm breeding began to expand after Malaysia's Department of Agriculture established an exchange program with West African economies and four private plantations formed the Oil Palm Genetics Laboratory. The Malaysian government also established Kolej Serdang, which became the Universiti Putra Malaysia (UPM) in the 1970s to train agricultural and agroindustrial engineers and agribusiness graduates to conduct research in the field.

In 1979, with support from the Malaysian Agricultural Research and Development Institute (MARDI) and UPM, the government set up the Palm Oil Research Institute of Malaysia (PORIM), a public-and-private-coordinated institution, meaning PORIM was run by representatives from government and industry B.C. Sekhar was appointed founder and chairman and Yusof Basiron served as Director-General.

PORIM was merged with the Palm Oil Licensing and Registration Authority (PORLA) to form the Malaysian Palm Oil Board in 2000. MPOB scientists work in oil palm tree breeding, palm oil nutrition and potential oleochemical uses.

== Biodiesel ==
The Malaysian government established the National Biofuel Policy in 2006, which led to the implementation of the B5 mandate in some regions of the country. The B5 mandate requires that all diesel sold in these regions of Malaysia contain 5% palm oil biodiesel. This mandate is expected to be expanded nationwide in 2014, with plans to increase the minimum palm oil biodiesel content to 10%. The biodiesel sector in Malaysia has struggled to become profitable, due in part to the high cost of crude palm oil, which led to a dip in biodiesel production in the late 2000s. In 2012, there were 20 biodiesel plants in Malaysia, of which 2 were operational by early 2013. According to an advisor to the Roundtable on Sustainable Palm Oil, biodiesel production in Malaysia is expected to double in 2013.

== Labour practices ==
According to the United States Department of Labor Bureau of International Labor Affairs' List of Goods Produced by Child Labor or Forced Labor, Malaysia's palm oil industry includes both child labour and forced labour practices.

== See also ==
- Council of Palm Oil Producing Countries
- Malaysia Derivatives Exchange
- Palm oil production in Indonesia
- Social and environmental impact of palm oil
