= Issues relating to biofuels =

Social, economic, environmental and technical issues

Issues relating to biofuel are social, economic, environmental and technical problems that may arise from biofuel production and use. Social and economic issues include the "food vs fuel" debate and the need to develop responsible policies and economic instruments to ensure sustainable biofuel production. Farming for biofuels feedstock can be detrimental to the environment if not done sustainably. Environmental concerns include deforestation, biodiversity loss and soil erosion as a result of land clearing for biofuels agriculture. While biofuels can contribute to reduction in global carbon emissions, indirect land use change for biofuel production can have the inverse effect. Technical issues include possible modifications necessary to run the engine on biofuel, as well as energy balance and efficiency.

The International Resource Panel outlined the wider and interrelated factors that need to be considered when deciding on the relative merits of pursuing one biofuel over another. The IRP concluded that not all biofuels perform equally in terms of their effect on climate, energy security and ecosystems, and suggested that environmental and social effects need to be assessed throughout the entire life-cycle.

== Social and economic effects ==
=== Oil price moderation ===
The International Energy Agency's World Energy Outlook 2006 concludes that rising oil demand, if left unchecked, would accentuate the consuming countries' vulnerability to a severe supply disruption and resulting price shock. The report suggested that biofuels may one day offer a viable alternative, but also that "the implications of the use of biofuels for global security as well as for economic, environmental, and public health need to be further evaluated".

According to Francisco Blanch, a commodity strategist for Merrill Lynch, crude oil would be trading 15 per cent higher and gasoline would be as much as 25 per cent more expensive, if it were not for biofuels. Gordon Quaiattini, president of the Canadian Renewable Fuels Association, argued that a healthy supply of alternative energy sources will help to combat gasoline price spikes.

=== "Food vs. fuel" debate ===
Food vs fuel is the debate regarding the risk of diverting farmland or crops for biofuels production in detriment of the food supply on a global scale. Essentially the debate refers to the possibility that by farmers increasing their production of these crops, often through government subsidy incentives, their time and land is shifted away from other types of non-biofuel crops driving up the price of non-biofuel crops due to the decrease in production. Therefore, it is not only that there is an increase in demand for the food staples, like corn and cassava, that sustain the majority of the world's poor but this also has the potential to increase the price of the remaining crops that these individuals would otherwise need to utilize to supplement their diets. A recent study for the International Centre for Trade and Sustainable Development shows that market-driven expansion of ethanol in the US increased maize prices by 21 percent in 2009, in comparison with what prices would have been had ethanol production been frozen at 2004 levels. A November 2011 study states that biofuels, their production, and their subsidies are leading causes of agricultural price shocks. The counter-argument includes considerations of the type of corn that is utilized in biofuels, often field corn not suitable for human consumption; the portion of the corn that is used in ethanol, the starch portion; and the negative effect higher prices for corn and grains have on government welfare for these products. The "food vs. fuel" or "food or fuel" debate is internationally controversial, with disagreement about how significant this is, what is causing it, what the effect is, and what can or should be done about it. The world is facing three global crises, energy, food and environment. Changing the trend of recreation or population growth can impact each one of these. By increasing the world population, the ratio of energy and food demands will increase as well. So, it can put these two energy and food industries in completion of supplying. Developing the techniques and utilizing the food crops for biofuel production, especially in shortage areas, can adverse the competition between the food and biofuel industries. It can be cay that harvesting and producing biofuels crop on a large scale can put local food communities at risk, such as challenges to access lands and portions of the food. If the food economy cannot place safe and stable, protocols such as Kyoto can not meet their purposes and help control emissions.

=== Poverty reduction ===
Researchers at the Overseas Development Institute have argued that biofuels could help to reduce poverty in the developing world, through increased employment, wider economic growth multipliers and by stabilising oil prices (many developing countries are net importers of oil). However, this potential is described as 'fragile', and is reduced where feedstock production tends to be large scale, or causes pressure on limited agricultural resources: capital investment, land, water, and the net cost of food for the poor.

With regards to the potential for poverty reduction or exacerbation, biofuels rely on many of the same policy, regulatory or investment shortcomings that impede agriculture as a route to poverty reduction. Since many of these shortcomings require policy improvements at a country level rather than a global one, they argue for a country-by-country analysis of the potential poverty effects of biofuels. This would consider, among other things, land administration systems, market coordination and prioritizing investment in biodiesel, as this 'generates more labour, has lower transportation costs and uses simpler technology'. Also necessary are reductions in the tariffs on biofuel imports regardless of the country of origin, especially due to the increased efficiency of biofuel production in countries such as Brazil.

=== Sustainable biofuel production ===
Responsible policies and economic instruments would help to ensure that biofuel commercialization, including the development of new cellulosic technologies, is sustainable. Responsible commercialization of biofuels represents an opportunity to enhance sustainable economic prospects in Africa, Latin America and impoverished Asia.

== Environmental effects ==
=== Soil erosion and deforestation ===
Large-scale deforestation of mature trees (which help remove CO_{2} through photosynthesis — much better than sugar cane or most other biofuel feedstock crops do) contributes to soil erosion, un-sustainable global warming atmospheric greenhouse gas levels, loss of habitat, and a reduction of valuable biodiversity (both on land as in oceans). Demand for biofuel has led to clearing land for palm oil plantations. In Indonesia alone, over 9,400,000 acres (38,000 km^{2}) of forest have been converted to plantations since 1996.

A portion of the biomass should be retained onsite to support the soil resource. Normally this will be in the form of raw biomass, but processed biomass is also an option. If the exported biomass is used to produce syngas, the process can be used to co-produce biochar, a low-temperature charcoal used as a soil amendment to increase soil organic matter to a degree not practical with less recalcitrant forms of organic carbon. For co-production of biochar to be widely adopted, the soil amendment and carbon sequestration value of co-produced charcoal must exceed its net value as a source of energy.

Some commentators claim that removal of additional cellulosic biomass for biofuel production will further deplete soils.

=== Effect on water resources ===
Increased use of biofuels puts increasing pressure on water resources in at least two ways: water use for the irrigation of crops used as feedstocks for biodiesel production; and water use in the production of biofuels in refineries, mostly for boiling and cooling.

In many parts of the world supplemental or full irrigation is needed to grow feedstocks. For example, if in the production of corn (maize) half the water needs of crops are met through irrigation and the other half through rainfall, about 860 liters of water are needed to produce one liter of ethanol. However, in the United States only 5-15% of the water required for corn comes from irrigation while the other 85-95% comes from natural rainfall.

In the United States, the number of ethanol factories has almost tripled from 50 in 2000 to about 140 in 2008. A further 60 or so are under construction, and many more are planned. Projects are being challenged by residents at courts in Missouri (where water is drawn from the Ozark Aquifer), Iowa, Nebraska, Kansas (all of which draw water from the non-renewable Ogallala Aquifer), central Illinois (where water is drawn from the Mahomet Aquifer) and Minnesota.

For example, the four ethanol crops: corn, sugarcane, sweet sorghum and pine yield net energy. However, increasing production in order to meet the U.S. Energy Independence and Security Act mandates for renewable fuels by 2022 would take a heavy toll in the states of Florida and Georgia. The sweet sorghum, which performed the best of the four, would increase the amount of freshwater withdrawals from the two states by almost 25%.

=== Pollution ===
Formaldehyde, acetaldehyde and other aldehydes are produced when alcohols are oxidized. When only a 10% mixture of ethanol is added to gasoline (as is common in American E10 gasohol and elsewhere), aldehyde emissions increase 40%. Some study results are conflicting on this fact however, and lowering the sulfur content of biofuel mixes lowers the acetaldehyde levels. Burning biodiesel also emits aldehydes and other potentially hazardous aromatic compounds which are not regulated in emissions laws.

Many aldehydes are toxic to living cells. Formaldehyde irreversibly cross-links protein amino acids, which produces the hard flesh of embalmed bodies. At high concentrations in an enclosed space, formaldehyde can be a significant respiratory irritant causing nose bleeds, respiratory distress, lung disease, and persistent headaches. Acetaldehyde, which is produced in the body by alcohol drinkers and found in the mouths of smokers and those with poor oral hygiene, is carcinogenic and mutagenic.

The European Union has banned products that contain formaldehyde, due to its documented carcinogenic characteristics. The U.S. Environmental Protection Agency has labeled Formaldehyde as a probable cause of cancer in humans.

Brazil burns significant amounts of ethanol biofuel. Gas chromatograph studies were performed of ambient air in São Paulo, Brazil, and compared to Osaka, Japan, which does not burn ethanol fuel. Atmospheric Formaldehyde was 160% higher in Brazil, and Acetaldehyde was 260% higher.

== Technical issues ==
=== Energy efficiency and energy balance ===
Despite its occasional proclamation as a "green" fuel, first-generation biofuels, primarily ethanol, are not without their own GHG emissions. While ethanol does produce fewer overall GHG emissions than gasoline, its production is still an energy intensive process with secondary effects. Gasoline generally produces 8.91 kg CO_{2} per gallon, compared to 8.02 kg CO_{2} per gallon for E10 ethanol and 1.34 kg CO_{2} per gallon for E85 ethanol. Based on a study by Dias de Oliveira et al. (2005), corn-based ethanol requires 65.02 gigajoules (GJ) of energy per hectare (ha) and produces approximately 1236.72 kg per ha of carbon dioxide (CO_{2}), while sugar cane-based ethanol requires 42.43 GJ/ha and produces 2268.26 kg/ha of CO_{2} under the assumption of non-carbon neutral energy production. These emissions accrue from agricultural production, crop cultivation, and ethanol processing. Once the ethanol is blended with gasoline, it results in carbon-savings of approximately 0.89 kg of CO_{2} per gallon consumed (U.S. D.O.E., 2011a).

=== Economic viability ===
From a production standpoint, miscanthus can produce 742 gallons of ethanol per acre of land, which is nearly twice as much as corn (399 gal/acre, assuming average yield of 145 bushels per acre under normal corn-soybean rotation) and nearly three times as much as corn stover (165 gal/acre) and switchgrass (214 gal/acre). Production costs are a big impediment to large-scale implementation of 2nd Generation bio-fuels, and their market demand will depend primarily on their price competitiveness relative to corn ethanol and gasoline. At this time, costs of conversion of cellulosic fuels, at $1.46 per gallon, were roughly twice that of corn-based ethanol, at $0.78 per gallon. Cellulosic biofuels from corn stover and miscanthus were 24% and 29% more expensive than corn ethanol, respectively, and switchgrass biofuel is more than twice as expensive as corn ethanol.

| Description (CASE) ('000 US$) | Developed Nation (2G) CASE A | Developing Nation (2G) CASE B | Developed Nation (1G) CASE C | Developing Nation (1G) CASE D |
| Operating Profit | 209,313 | -1,176,017 | 166,952 | -91,300 |
| Net Present Value | 100,690 | -1,011,217 | 40,982 | 39,224 |
| Return on Investment | 1.41 | 0.32 | 1.17 | 0.73 |

=== Carbon emissions ===
Biofuels and other forms of renewable energy aim to be carbon neutral or even carbon negative. Carbon neutral means that the carbon released during the use of the fuel, e.g. through burning to power transport or generate electricity, is reabsorbed and balanced by the carbon absorbed by new plant growth. These plants are then harvested to make the next batch of fuel. Carbon neutral fuels lead to no net increases in human contributions to atmospheric carbon dioxide levels, reducing the human contributions to global warming. A carbon negative aim is achieved when a portion of the biomass is used for carbon sequestration. Calculating exactly how much greenhouse gas (GHG) is produced in burning biofuels is a complex and inexact process, which depends very much on the method by which the fuel is produced and other assumptions made in the calculation.

The carbon emissions (carbon footprint) produced by biofuels are calculated using a technique called Life Cycle Analysis (LCA). This uses a "cradle to grave" or "well to wheels" approach to calculate the total amount of carbon dioxide and other greenhouse gases emitted during biofuel production, from putting seed in the ground to using the fuel in cars and trucks. Many different LCAs have been done for different biofuels, with widely differing results. Several well-to-wheel analysis for biofuels has shown that first generation biofuels can reduce carbon emissions, with savings depending on the feedstock used, and second generation biofuels can produce even higher savings when compared to using fossil fuels. However, those studies did not take into account emissions from nitrogen fixation, or additional carbon emissions due to indirect land use changes. In addition, many LCA studies fail to analyze the effect of substitutes that may come into the market to replace current biomass-based products. In the case of Crude Tall Oil, a raw material used in the production of pine chemicals and now being diverted for use in biofuel, an LCA study found that the global carbon footprint of pine chemicals produced from CTO is 50 percent lower than substitute products used in the same situation offsetting any gains from utilizing a biofuel to replace fossil fuels. Additionally the study showed that fossil fuels are not reduced when CTO is diverted to biofuel use and the substitute products consume disproportionately more energy. This diversion will negatively affect an industry that contributes significantly to the world economy, globally producing more than 3 billion pounds of pine chemicals annually in complex, high technology refineries and providing jobs directly and indirectly for tens of thousands of workers.

A paper published in February 2008 in Sciencexpress by a team led by Searchinger from Princeton University concluded that once considered indirect land use changes effects in the life cycle assessment of biofuels used to substitute gasoline, instead of savings both corn and cellulosic ethanol increased carbon emissions as compared to gasoline by 93 and 50 percent respectively. A second paper published in the same issue of Sciencexpress, by a team led by Fargione from The Nature Conservancy, found that a carbon debt is created when natural lands are cleared and being converted to biofuel production and to crop production when agricultural land is diverted to biofuel production, therefore this carbon debt applies to both direct and indirect land use changes.

The Searchinger and Fargione studies gained prominent attention in both the popular media and in scientific journals. The methodology, however, drew some criticism, with Wang and Haq from Argonne National Laboratory posted a public letter and send their criticism about the Searchinger paper to Letters to Science. Another criticism by Kline and Dale from Oak Ridge National Laboratory was published in Letters to Science. They argued that Searchinger et al. and Fargione et al. "...do not provide adequate support for their claim that biofuels cause high emissions due to land-use change. The U.S. biofuel industry also reacted, claiming in a public letter, that the "Searchinger study is clearly a "worst-case scenario" analysis..." and that this study "relies on a long series of highly subjective assumptions...".

=== Engine design ===
The modifications necessary to run internal combustion engines on biofuel depend on the type of biofuel used, as well as the type of engine used. For example, gasoline engines can run without any modification at all on biobutanol. Minor modifications are however needed to run on bioethanol or biomethanol. Diesel engines can run on the latter fuels, as well as on vegetable oils (which are cheaper). However, the latter is only possible when the engine has been foreseen with indirect injection. If no indirect injection is present, the engine hence needs to be fitted with this.

== Campaigns ==
A number of environmental NGOs campaign against the production of biofuels as a large-scale alternative to fossil fuels. For example, Friends of the Earth state that "the current rush to develop agrofuels (or biofuels) on a large scale is ill-conceived and will contribute to an already unsustainable trade whilst not solving the problems of climate change or energy security". Some mainstream environmental groups support biofuels as a significant step toward slowing or stopping global climate change. However, supportive environmental groups generally hold the view that biofuel production can threaten the environment if it is not done sustainably. This finding has been backed by reports of the UN, the IPCC, and some other smaller environmental and social groups as the EEB and the Bank Sarasin, which generally remain negative about biofuels.

As a result, governmental and environmental organizations are turning against biofuels made in a non-sustainable way (hereby preferring certain oil sources as jatropha and lignocellulose over palm oil) and are asking for global support for this. Also, besides supporting these more sustainable biofuels, environmental organizations are redirecting to new technologies that do not use internal combustion engines such as hydrogen and compressed air.

Several standard-setting and certification initiatives have been set up on the topic of biofuels. The "Roundtable on Sustainable Biofuels" is an international initiative which brings together farmers, companies, governments, non-governmental organizations, and scientists who are interested in the sustainability of biofuels production and distribution. During 2008, the Roundtable is developing a series of principles and criteria for sustainable biofuels production through meetings, teleconferences, and online discussions. In a similar vein, the Bonsucro standard has been developed as a metric-based certificate for products and supply chains, as a result of an ongoing multi-stakeholder initiative focussing on the products of sugar cane, including ethanol fuel.

The increased manufacture of biofuels will require increasing land areas to be used for agriculture. Second and third generation biofuel processes can ease the pressure on land, because they can use waste biomass, and existing (untapped) sources of biomass such as crop residues and potentially even marine algae.

In some regions of the world, a combination of increasing demand for food, and increasing demand for biofuel, is causing deforestation and threats to biodiversity. The best reported example of this is the expansion of oil palm plantations in Malaysia and Indonesia, where rainforest is being destroyed to establish new oil palm plantations. It is an important fact that 90% of the palm oil produced in Malaysia is used by the food industry; therefore biofuels cannot be held solely responsible for this deforestation. There is a pressing need for sustainable palm oil production for the food and fuel industries; palm oil is used in a wide variety of food products. The Roundtable on Sustainable Biofuels is working to define criteria, standards and processes to promote sustainably produced biofuels. Palm oil is also used in the manufacture of detergents, and in electricity and heat generation both in Asia and around the world (the UK burns palm oil in coal-fired power stations to generate electricity).

Significant area is likely to be dedicated to sugar cane in future years as demand for ethanol increases worldwide. The expansion of sugar cane plantations will place pressure on environmentally sensitive native ecosystems including rainforest in South America. In forest ecosystems, these effects themselves will undermine the climate benefits of alternative fuels, in addition to representing a major threat to global biodiversity.

Although biofuels are generally considered to improve net carbon output, biodiesel and other fuels do produce local air pollution, including nitrogen oxides, the principal cause of smog.

== See also ==
- Agflation
- Environmental impact of aviation
- Social and environmental impact of palm oil
- Environmental issues with energy
- Indirect land use change impacts of biofuels
- List of environmental issues
