= RSPO =

RSPO may refer to:

- Roundtable on Sustainable Palm Oil
- Royal Stockholm Philharmonic Orchestra
