= Roundtable on Sustainable Palm Oil =

Agreement on palm oil supply

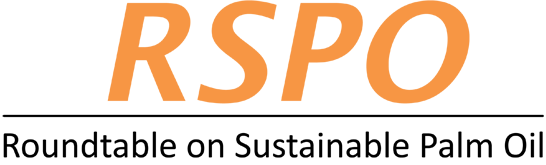
- Abbreviation: RSPO
- Formation: April 2004
- Type: Nonprofit
- Headquarters: Geneva and Kuala Lumpur
- CEO: Joseph (JD) D'Cruz
- Staff: 51–200
- Website: www.rspo.org

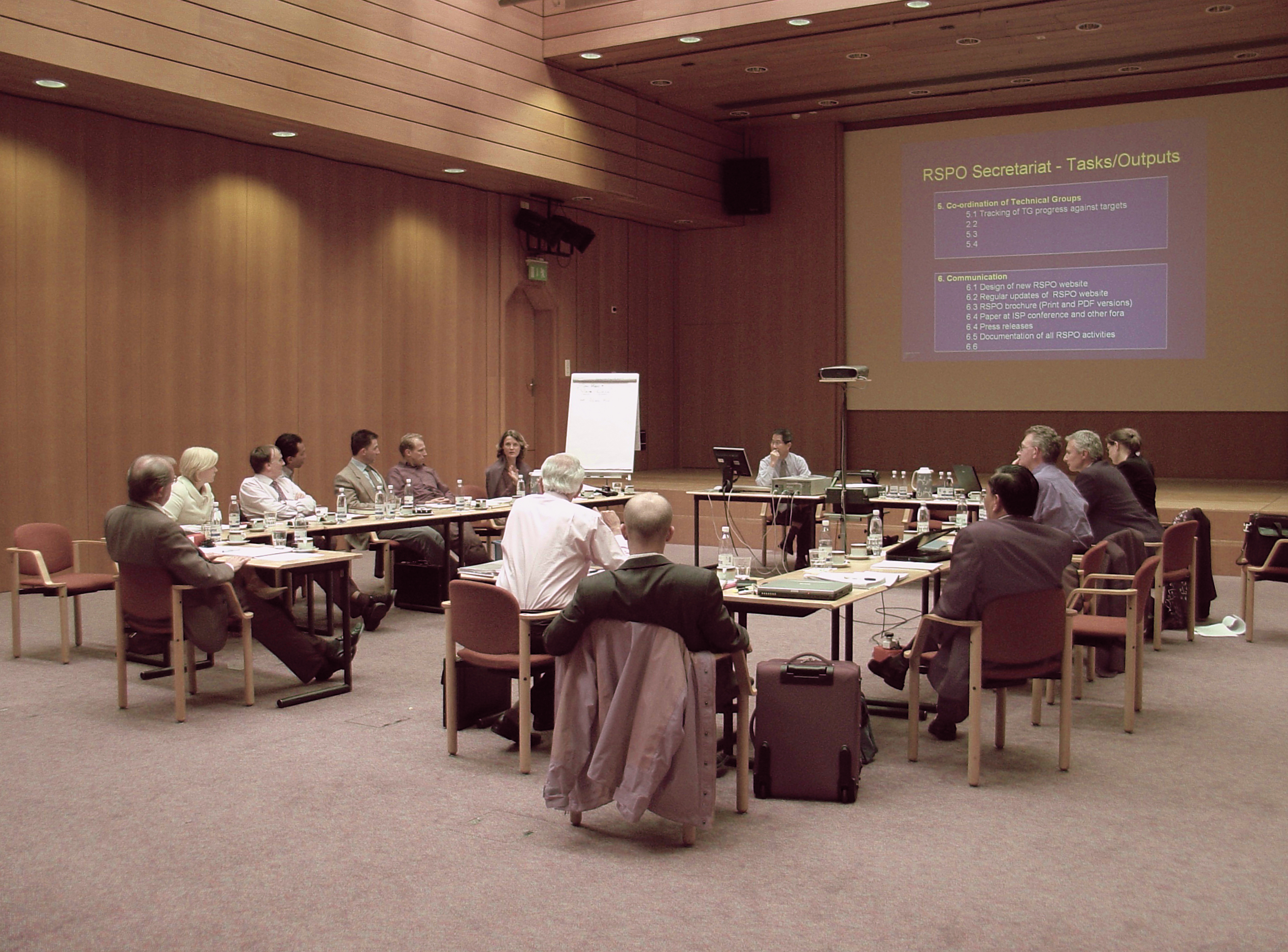
Roundtable No 2 (RT2) in Zürich in 2005

The Roundtable on Sustainable Palm Oil (RSPO) was established in 2004 with the objective of promoting the growth and use of sustainable palm oil products through global standards and multistakeholder governance. The seat of the association is in Zürich, Switzerland, while the secretariat is currently based in Kuala Lumpur, with a satellite office in Jakarta. RSPO currently has 5,650 members from 94 countries. These members include palm oil producers, manufacturers who use palm oil in their products, and some environmental groups.

The RSPO was established following concerns raised by non-governmental organizations about environmental impacts resulting from palm oil production.

51,999,404 tonnes of palm oil fruit produced in 2016 was RSPO certified. Products containing Certified Sustainable Palm Oil (CSPO) can carry the RSPO trademark. In 2014, Indonesia accounted for 40% of global palm oil production and 44% of the total RSPO-certified areas.

After the meeting in 2009, a number of environmental organisations were critical of the scope of the agreements reached. Palm oil growers who produce CSPO have been critical of the organization because, though they have met RSPO standards and assumed the costs associated with certification, the market demand for certified palm oil remains low. Even though deforestation has decreased in RSPO-certified oil palm plantations, peatlands continue to be drained and burned for the creation of new RSPO-certified palm plantations. Additionally, no mention to well-documented health effects of palm oil is made by the organization.

In 2019, RSPO launched the Independent Smallholder Standard (ISH). By simplifying documentation and cost requirements, it expanded the RSPO system to smallholder farmers not affiliated with large corporations or cooperatives.This enhanced smallholder management awareness and skills, improved sustainable palm oil market opportunities, and enhanced palm oil community development and income.

== Criticisms ==
The RSPO has been criticised by various sectors, especially the environmental NGOs. Issues include the impact of palm oil plantations on the orangutan population; destruction of tropical forest for the new oil palm plantations; the burning and draining of large tracts of peat swamp forest in Borneo, Malaysia. The fact that RSPO members are allowed to clear cut pristine forest areas, when there are large areas of grasslands available in Indonesia, raises doubts about commitment to sustainability. In 2013, the 11th annual RSPO meeting was crashed by palm oil workers and others, and Indonesian and international labour-rights groups have documented a litany of abuses, including forced labour and child labour. A 2013 study uncovered "flagrant disregard for human rights at some of the very plantations the RSPO certifies as 'sustainable'".

The RSPO's pace of progress has drawn considerable negative attention. The organization is currently revising its core Principles and Criteria, only now after five years with the current set, to include a clear standard on deforestation of high conservation value forests, and it took until 2017 to develop a clear Smallholder Standard.

The Rainforest Action Network views the RSPO as a greenwashing tool. Meanwhile, Greenpeace claims that, whilst RSPO has finally banned deforestation after 14 years, this isn't enforced and its members continue to destroy forests.

The effectiveness of RSPO certification in upholding social and environmental standards in the palm oil industry has been questioned. Using long-term census data from Indonesia, the world's largest palm oil producer, the study compared the real differences between those with and without RSPO certification. The study found that the impact of RSPO certification on village-level well-being varied across regions.

Minor positive effects were observed in villages that relied primarily on market-based livelihoods before certification, while RSPO certification was associated with significant negative outcomes in rural areas dominated by subsistence farming. This discrepancy may be due to the fact that certified plantations controlled by a single company tend to be larger than non-certified plantations, making their resulting social and environmental externalities more difficult to mitigate. These negative externalities are then borne by neighboring non-RSPO-certified plantations.

=== Scientific analysis ===
In July 2020, scientists used 30-year time series of satellite images to reveal that palm oil producing areas certified as sustainable had replaced tropical forests of Sumatra and Borneo, including important habitat for endangered mammals. The assessment relied on causal inference, i.e., that deforestation was explicitly linked to certified plantations. A counterfactual evaluation of forest loss in the same region found that certification significantly reduced deforestation, but clearance of peatland clearance or land fires, among participating plantations. Counterfactual evaluations also reveal subtle differences in oil palm impacts between regions, and important trade-offs between environment and development. For example, an appraisal of more than 3000 villages in Indonesia with large-scale oil palm plantations found that compared with similar villages with non-certified plantations, those with RSPO certified plantations experienced an overall reduction in well-being. However, this pattern masked considerable variation across oil palm producing villages - those that had long established plantation agriculture (primarily in Sumatra) experienced improvements in well-being following certification, while those that relied more on subsistence-based livelihoods (primarily in Kalimantan) did not. Those involved in counterfactual evaluations of oil palm and certification agree that more positive impacts of certification will follow recent improvements in standards

=== World Wildlife Fund (WWF) ===
The WWF released a Palm Oil Buyer's Scorecard in 2009. The website stated in 2010:

Clearing for oil palm plantations threatens some of the world's greatest forests, endangered species such as orangutans, and puts forest-dwelling people at risk. But with better management practices, the palm oil industry could provide benefits without threatening our some of our most breathtaking natural treasures...

Reaching those objectives requires a common language for industry, environmental and social groups to work together. Through the Roundtable on Sustainable Palm Oil (RSPO), WWF has helped to establish a platform for these parties to collaborate towards the production of sustainable palm oil. Thanks to the RSPO, sustainable palm oil is now on the market. By applying stringent production criteria to all stages of palm oil manufacture, some companies are proving that oil palm plantations need not flourish at the expense of rainforests. But so much more remains to be done. Too many palm oil producers still ignore the destructive impacts of palm oil plantations, contributing to biodiversity loss and social unrest and more companies that buy palm oil need to switch to using certified sustainable palm oil in their products.

In 2018, the WWF updated its position to support the RSPO Updated Principles and Criteria, the outcome of an extensive multi-stakeholder consultation process on achieving sustainable palm oil production, stating that the RSPO "represents an essential tool that can help companies achieve their commitments to palm oil that is free of deforestation, expansion on peat, exploitation and the use of fire."

WWF continues to monitor the palm oil industry.

== Other roundtable initiatives ==
Similar initiatives have been established for other sectors including: Roundtable on Sustainable Biofuels, Roundtable on Sustainable Biomaterials, Roundtable on Sustainable Forests, Roundtable on Sustainable Development, Roundtable on Responsible Soy, and Roundtable for a Sustainable Cocoa Economy.

== See also ==
- Bumitama Agri
- IOI Group
- Social and environmental impact of palm oil
- Sustainability standards and certification
- Borneo peat swamp forests
