= Substitutional fuel =

Substitutional fuels are fuels that can replace, either partially or completely, conventional fuels. It includes biodiesel, biogas, alcohol, myco-diesel, algal fuel, and metal fuel. They have applications to replace conventional fuels in functions such as transportation, although they still compose a small proportion of global fuel sources. Lots of substitutional fuel use is the result of government-enforced mandates, exemptions, or subsidies.

== Externalities of conventional fuels ==
Conventional fuels include fossil fuels such as coal, oil (including fuel oil, diesel fuel, and gasoline), and natural gas. Fossil fuels have many negative externalities, most notably air pollution and contributing to climate change. Both the extraction and combustion of conventional fuels have negative externalities.

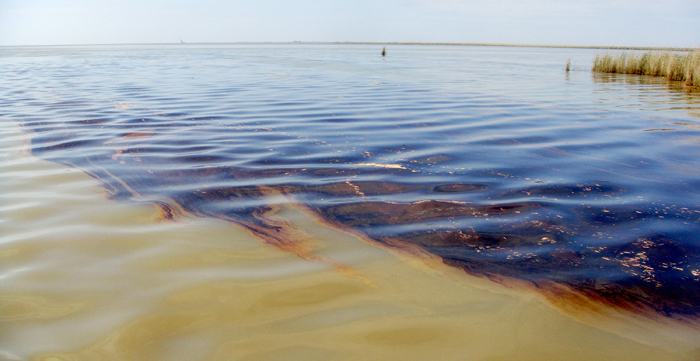
Oil pollutes the water in the Gulf of Mexico off the coast of Louisiana.

=== Negative ===
Sources:

- global warming due to the release of greenhouse gases
- ecosystem loss and degradation
- health problems such as respiratory issues, cancer, reduced life expectancy, and congestive heart failure due to the release of particulates
- degradation and soiling of buildings due to the release of particulates
- reduced crop yields due to the release of particulates
- oil spills
  - environmental damage
  - cleanup costs (private or government)
  - damage to company reputation (for example, the 2010 BP oil spill)
- volatile market prices negatively impact economy
- mining accidents during coal extraction

=== Positive ===
- increased employment & business activity
- increased productivity in many industries
- means of globalization (increased trade between countries)

== Externalities of substitutional fuels ==
=== Negative ===
- air pollution (but less so than conventional fuels)
- may require more energy to produce than conventional fuels
- may be more costly than conventional fuels

=== Positive ===
- more stable energy supply
- less volatile fuel prices
- less ecosystem damage
- fewer health problems due to air pollution

== The changing market ==
Substitutional fuel has been gaining popularity along with renewable energy in the United States over the past several decades. The Energy Independence and Security Act of 2007 requires that U.S. transportation fuels contain 36 billion gallons of renewable fuels.

"A market failure can arise in the transport fuels market if the potential differences in emissions from petroleum based fuels and those from biofuels are not taken into account in the decisions of fuel producers and consumers...Policy intervention through an emissions tax or a subsidy for avoided emissions could be justified to address this market failure."

Demand for substitutional fuel is also dependent on the availability of alternative energy vehicles, since 29% of energy consumption in the U.S. is from transportation. In 2017, biofuels composed about 5% of transportation fuels.
Biofuels are currently a leading substitutional fuel. The U.S. Energy Information Administration forecasts a stable biofuel market through 2020. Due to relatively stable domestic motor gasoline consumption in recent years, the industry is not likely to see large growth in the near future without government support.

U.S. Annual Fuel Consumption (Quadrillion BTU)
Year	Coal	Natural Gas	Petroleum	Total Fossil Fuels	Biomass	Total Renewable Energy
2000	22.58	23.82	38.23	84.69	3.01	6.10
2001	21.91	22.77	38.15	82.86	2.62	5.16
2002	21.90	23.51	38.19	83.66	2.70	5.73
2003	22.32	22.83	38.77	83.97	2.81	5.94
2004	22.47	22.92	40.21	85.74	3.01	6.07
2005	22.80	22.57	40.28	85.69	3.11	6.23
2006	22.45	22.24	39.80	84.55	3.26	6.64
2007	22.75	23.66	39.45	85.88	3.48	6.52
2008	22.39	23.84	36.84	83.11	3.85	7.17
2009	19.69	23.42	34.86	77.94	3.94	7.61
2010	20.83	24.57	35.42	80.82	4.51	8.27
2011	19.66	24.95	34.73	79.35	4.61	9.20
2012	17.38	26.09	33.94	77.41	4.51	8.85
2013	18.04	26.81	34.50	79.33	4.85	9.45
2014	18.00	27.38	34.76	80.12	4.99	9.74
2015	15.55	28.19	35.48	79.20	4.98	9.72
2016	14.23	28.40	35.82	78.42	5.02	10.37
2017	13.84	28.03	36.17	78.02	5.08	11.18
Net change	-8.74	+4.21	-2.05	-6.68	+2.08	+5.07

The above table shows the proportions of energy consumption by source in the U.S. from 2000 to 2017 using data from the Energy Information Administration. Fossil fuel consumption has declined overall, although natural gas consumption has increased. Both biomass and general renewable energy consumption has increased.

== See also ==
- Low-carbon economy
- Fossil fuel phase-out
- Sustainable biofuel
