= Mina Susana Setra =

Mina Susana Setra is an indigenous, environmental and land rights activist from Borneo. She serves as an activist for the Indigenous People's Alliance of the Archipelago and was instrumental in securing a ruling from the Constitutional Court recognizing customary land rights of indigenous people.

== Biography ==
Mina Susana Setra is a Dayak Pompakng from West Kalimantan. Her childhood home was converted to a palm oil plantation in 1976, changing both the environment and the make-up of the local community. Among the Dayak, alcohol use, gambling and prostitution have climbed and coercion, violence and inadequate compensation for displacement has led to poverty and loss of cultural identity.

Setra has worked in the areas of policy and advocacy at the Indigenous Peoples' Alliance of the Archipelago (AMAN) since it was founded in 1999. Her interest lies in implementing policy that protects the rights of indigenous people in Indonesia and their environment. She has worked on the global program Reducing Emissions from Deforestation and Forest Degradation (REDD) and when indigenous people were excluded from governmental negotiations with donor nations on forest and climate initiatives Setra protested the exclusion for violating the United Nations Declaration on the Rights of Indigenous People (UNDRIP).

In 2012, she led an advocacy team to submit a review of the Forestry Law to the Constitutional Court, which recognized the customary rights of indigenous people. In 2014, she was elected regional representative of Kalimantan Region for the Dedicated Grant Mechanism for Indigenous Peoples and Local Communities in Indonesia.

Mina is also a founder of Ruai TV, a television outlet providing media access to marginalized communities in West Kalimantan. The station utilizes "citizen journalism" to give community members a voice.
