= Social and environmental impact of palm oil =

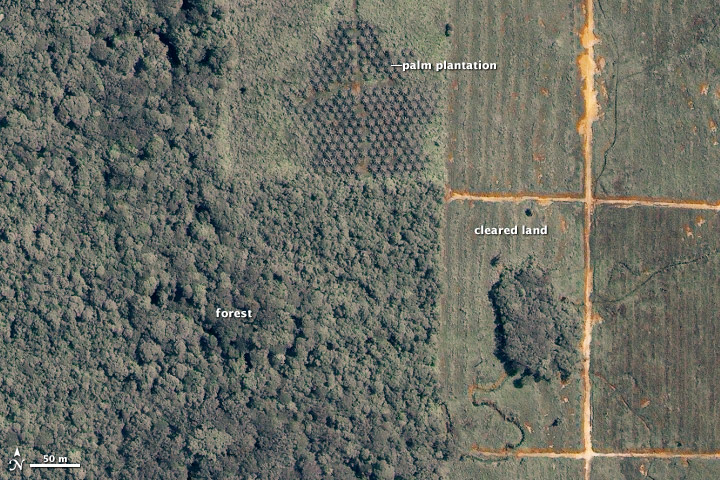
A satellite image showing deforestation in Malaysian Borneo to allow the plantation of oil palm

Palm oil, produced from the oil palm, is a basic source of income for many farmers in Southeast Asia, Central and West Africa, and Central America. Its cultivation and production (often monoculture on previously carbon-sequestering, biodiverse forest land) often coincides with human rights abuses (including rape, human trafficking, child labor, and slavery), displacement and disruption of human and animal populations, and other harmful environmental effects. These impacts can be significant, as oil palms produce 38% of the world's vegetable-oil output on 6% of the world's vegetable-oil farmland, and products from oil palms are widespread in cosmetics. There has also been considerable greenwashing of deforestation and animal cruelty related to palm oil production, with offenders including palm oil producers that received certifications of sustainability.

== Statistics ==
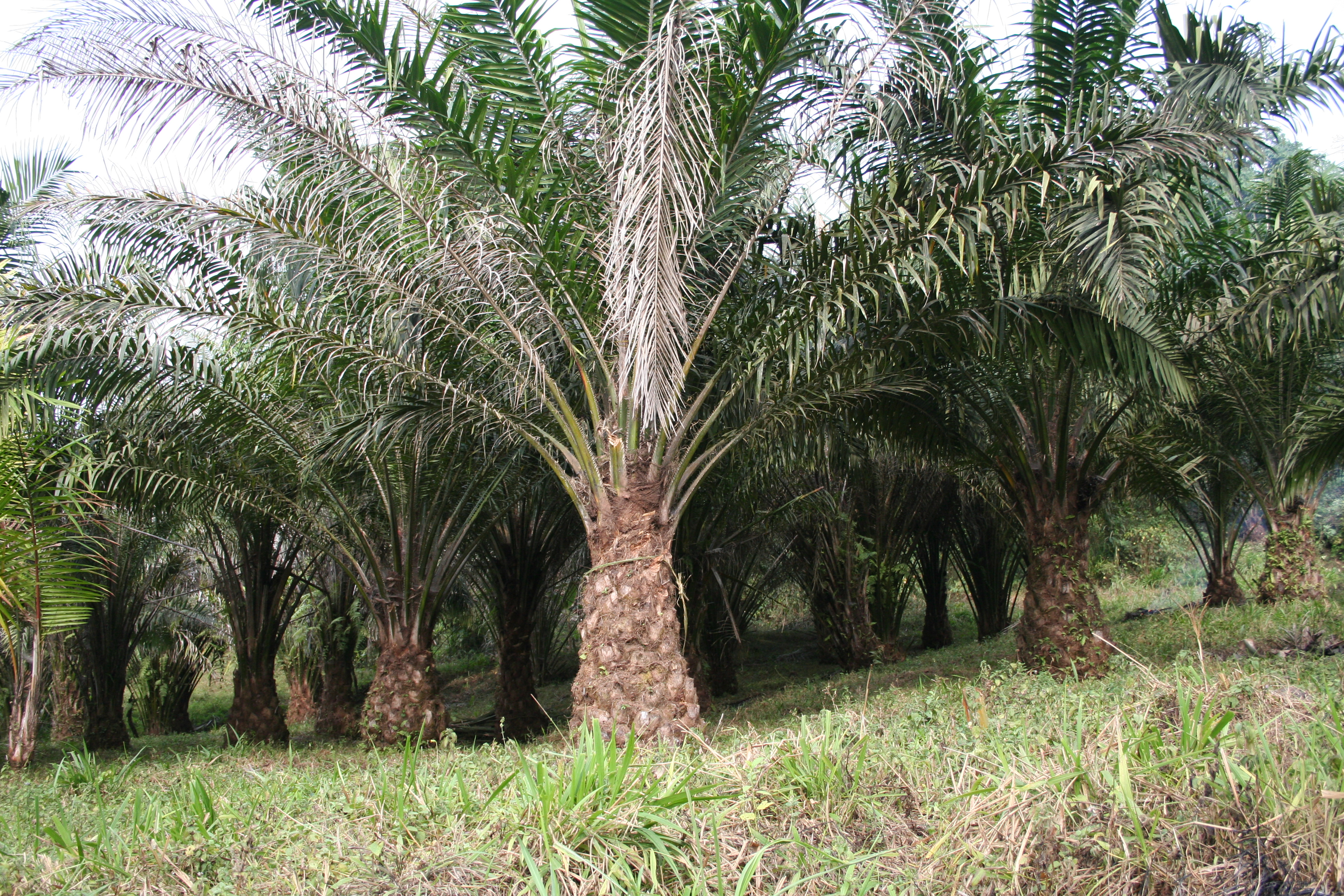
Oil palms (Elaeis guineensis)

Oil palm fruit is one of the most widely produced primary crops in the world.

An estimated 1.5 million small farmers grow the crop in Indonesia, along with about 500,000 people directly employed in the sector in Malaysia, plus those connected with related industries.

As of 2006, the cumulative land area of palm oil plantations is approximately 11,000,000 hectares (42,000 sq mi). In 2005 the Malaysian Palm Oil Association, responsible for about half of the world's crop, estimated that they manage about half a billion perennial carbon-sequestering palm trees. Demand for palm oil has been rising and is expected to climb further.

Between 1967 and 2000 the area under cultivation in Indonesia expanded from less than 2,000 square kilometres (770 sq mi) to more than 30,000 square kilometres (12,000 sq mi). Deforestation in Indonesia for palm oil (and illegal logging) is so rapid that a 2007 United Nations Environment Programme (UNEP) report said that most of the country's forest might be destroyed by 2022. The rate of forest loss has declined in the past decade.

Global production is forecast at a record 46.9m tonnes in 2010, up from 45.3m in 2009, with Indonesia providing most of the increase.

== Social issues, human rights abuses, and violence ==
Oil palm is a valuable economic crop and provides a source of employment. It allows small landholders to participate in the cash economy and often results in improvements to local infrastructure and greater access to services such as schools and health facilities. In some areas, the cultivation of oil palm has replaced traditional practices, often due to the higher income potential of palm oil. However, the modernisation of cultivation practices has also led to issues including food insecurity. This issue stems from the intensive use of land which leads to soil degradation. As a result, the ability for locals to produce their own food has dwindled and they are having to look for food in other areas as they can no longer rely exclusively on their land.

However, in some cases, land has been developed by oil palm plantations without consultation or compensation of the Indigenous Peoples occupying the land. This has occurred in Papua New Guinea, Colombia, and Indonesia. In the Sarawak state of Malaysian Borneo, there has been debate over whether there was an appropriate level of consultation with the Long Teran Kanan community prior to the development of local land for palm oil plantations. Appropriation of native lands has led to conflict between the plantations and local residents in each of these countries.

According to a 2008 report by NGOs including Friends of the Earth, palm oil companies have also reportedly used force to acquire land from Indigenous communities in Indonesia. Additionally, some Indonesian oil palm plantations are dependent on imported labor or undocumented immigrants, which has raised concerns about the working conditions and social impacts of these practices. Issues regarding the exploitation of child labor have also been a major concern.

The loss of land to oil palm cultivation is also associated with violence. Frédéric Mousseau, policy director at the Oakland Institute, has noted that "repeatedly, after losing their lands ... local communities in Africa and Asia have been subject to violence, intimidation, and distress as a result." Reporting by The Associated Press on palm-oil related incidents of "sexual abuse, rape, human trafficking, child labor, and slavery," disclosed that "almost every plantation has problems related to labor."

== Deforestation ==
=== Habitat loss ===
The production of palm oil requires intensive deforestation and this has led to a gradual loss of flora and fauna in the areas where land is cleared for the cultivation of palm oil. Tropical rainforests in countries including Malaysia and Indonesia have been the most ideal countries to have large palm oil plantations as they provide the most suitable climate with ample rainfall and sunshine throughout the year. Between the years 1990 and 2005, the total land in Malaysia used for palm oil cultivation increased by 2.4 million ha and reached 4.2 million ha. During that period, over 1.1 million ha of tropical rainforest was lost. The diverse biodiversity that each rainforest possesses has been diminishing at a rapid rate as fauna is often very fragile and easily affected by deforestation. Animal wildlife has been most affected in areas where significant amounts of land, for commercial palm oil purposes, have been cleared to allow the trees to be planted. Animals have been forced to relocate and have increasingly come into contact with humans as they have started to roam around the surrounding villages in search for food. Some animals have not been able to adapt and relocate elsewhere, leading to their populations decreasing significantly and this has disrupted the symbiotic relationships that the flora and fauna have with their habitat. Deforestation negatively affects biodiversity when forests are converted into plantations and leaves relatively low species richness in primary forests compared to undisturbed forests. One species of particular concern is the critically endangered Bornean orangutan. A notable study in 2018 showed that from 1999 to 2015, over 100,000 orangutans were lost due to unsustainable natural resource exploitation (including the palm oil industry). This number was obtained by tracking the number of nests over this 16-year study period. Results show that nests declined from 22.5 nests per kilometer at the start of the study, to 10.1 nests per kilometer by the end of the study. On the other hand E. guineensis cultivation also helps to push species invasions further, e.g. Anoplolepis gracilipes in southeast Asia. Biodiversity suffers in almost all taxa – Room 1975 and Fayle et al. 2010 find so for ants, Danielsen and Heegaard 1995 for bats and primates, Liow et al. 2001 for bees, Chung et al. 2000 for beetles, Peh et al. 2006 for birds, Davis and Philips 2005 for dung beetles, Hassall et al. 2006 for isopods, Glor et al. 2001 for lizards, Chang et al. 1997 for mosquitoes, Chey 2006 for moths, and Bernard et al. 2009 for small mammals. Almost all taxa also suffer loss of abundance but there are exceptions, species which increase abundance but still lose species richness – Davis and Philips 2005 find so in dung beetles, Hassall et al. 2006 in isopods, Glor et al. 2001 in lizards and Danielsen and Heegaard 1995 in bats. The very unusual exception is bees, which Liow et al. 2001 find lose abundance but gain species diversity in oil palm.

=== Soil degradation ===
The process of removing existing flora and planting palm oil trees is detrimental for the quality of the soil in the ground. When the existing flora is removed to make way for the new plants, the soil surrounding it is often eroded away. When palm oil trees are planted, large amounts of fertilisers and pesticides are used to ensure rapid growth and the health of each tree. Younger palm oil trees absorb more valuable nutrients from the soil which degrades the quality of the soil. As the nutrients are absorbed by the young trees, there is a depletion in nutrients and consequently, there is a lower level of remaining nutrients for other trees. This problem is also another cause for the increased use of fertilisers during the palm oil production process. Distances between adjacent palm oil trees in plantations have also been designed to be very close in order to optimise use of the limited space available. This has further impacted soil quality because as the trees grow, they require more minerals and water from the soil. Due to the close distances between trees, there is a limited supply of nutrients that the trees can depend on which leads to the plantation workers supplying the trees with higher amounts of fertilisers, pesticides and water. This process further harms the state of the soil and makes it challenging for existing flora and fauna to survive in the area. Tuma et al. 2019 find replacement of forest with oil palm plantations reduces the number of bioturbator species, although not the actual volume of bioturbation performed.

In tropical countries such as Malaysia and Indonesia, where a majority of palm oil plantations are located, there are continual rain showers and sun exposure throughout the day. Palm oil plantations that are geographically located close to rivers have exacerbated impacts on surrounding local communities. This is due to the increased use of fertilisers and pesticides which has led to higher amounts of both being washed away by the frequent rain into rivers. This is an issue because rivers are central to the daily lives of local villagers. They use water from the river for personal consumption and also use the river as a source of food, which makes them vulnerable to the residue from fertilisers and pesticides. The untreated water that the local villagers are exposed to can potentially cause detrimental health effects, including diseases such as cholera, E. coli and lead poisoning.

The damage from soil erosion and poor soil quality has also affected the livelihoods of many local villagers that live close to these palm oil plantations as they can no longer depend solely on their land for the cultivation of food and timber. Local villagers are now inclined to find new sources of food and materials for shelter. As a result, local villagers have been indirectly forced to move out and relocate depending on the extent of the loss of the plants and animals native to the area. This has led to economic complications as governments now need to reallocate their resources to support these typically marginalised communities.

== Other environmental issues ==
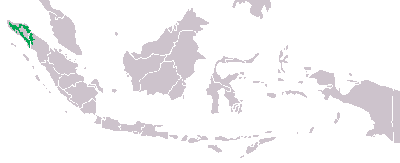
The remaining distribution of the Sumatran orangutan in Indonesia

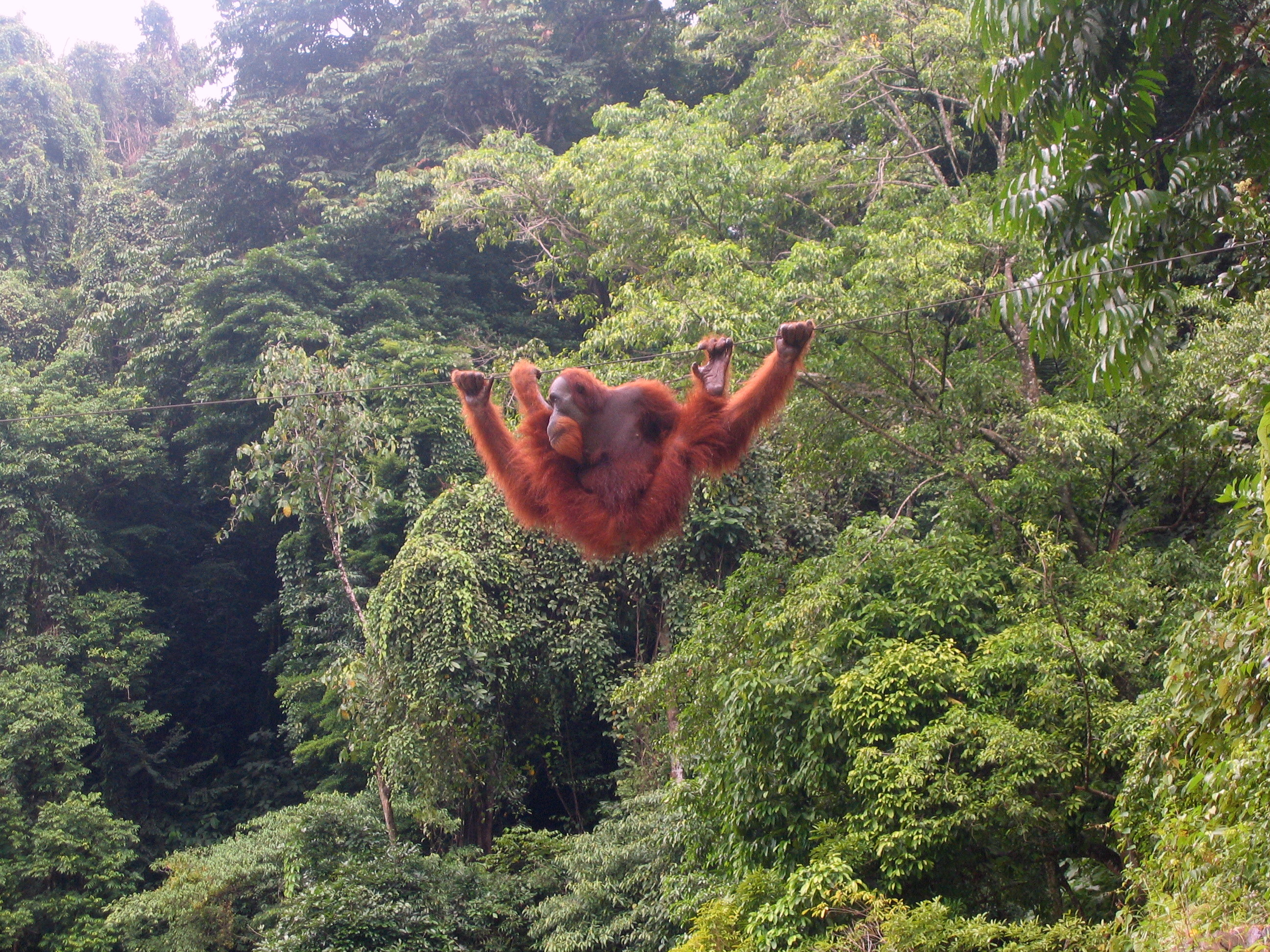
A Sumatran orangutan at Bukit Lawang, Indonesia

In Indonesia, rising demand for palm oil and timber has led to the clearing of tropical forest land in Indonesian national parks. According to a 2007 report published by UNEP, at the rate of deforestation at that time, an estimated 98 percent of Indonesian forest would be destroyed by 2022 due to legal and illegal logging, forest fires and the development of palm oil plantations.

Malaysia, the second largest producer of palm oil has pledged to conserve a minimum of 50 percent of its total land area as forests. As of 2010, 58 percent of Malaysia was forested.

Palm oil cultivation has been criticised for:

- Greenhouse gas emissions. Deforestation in tropical areas accounts for an estimated 10 percent of manmade CO_{2} emissions, and is a driver toward dangerous climate change.
- Habitat destruction, leading to the demise of critically endangered species (e.g. the Sumatran elephant, Sumatran tiger, the Sumatran rhinoceros, and the Sumatran orangutan).
- Reduced biodiversity, including damage to biodiversity hotspots.
- Cultivating crops on land that belongs to indigenous people in the Sarawak and Kalimantan states on the island of Borneo and the Malaysian state of Sabah.
- The increase in outbreaks of zoonotic diseases is linked with deforestation in tropical countries.

=== Water pollution ===
In some states where oil palm is established, lax enforcement of environmental legislation leads to encroachment of plantations into riparian strips, and release of pollutants such as palm oil mill effluent (POME) into the environment. POME is a waste product created during the final stages of palm oil extraction. The process of waste management can be highly difficult and costly. As a result, one common method of disposal involves discharge into nearby water reservoirs. POME contains high nutrient concentrations and can foster the growth of algae blooms, which deplete oxygen levels and can have negative implications for aquatic life, and consequently alter ecosystems.

More environment-friendly practices have been developed. Among those approaches is anaerobic treatment of POME, which might allow for biogas (methane) production and electricity generation, but it is very difficult to maintain optimum growth conditions for the anaerobic organisms that break down acetate to methane (primarily Methanosaeta concilii, a species of Archaea).

=== Greenhouse gas emissions ===
Damage to peatland, partly due to palm oil production, is claimed to contribute to environmental degradation, including four percent of global greenhouse gas emissions and eight percent of all global emissions caused annually by burning fossil fuels, due to the clearing of large areas of rainforest for palm oil plantations. Many Indonesian and Malaysian rainforests lie atop peat bogs that store great quantities of carbon. Forest removal and bog drainage to make way for plantations releases this carbon. A study reveals that the conversion of peatlands contributes between 16.6 and 27.9 percent of total greenhouse gas emissions from Malaysia and Indonesia combined. The process of draining peatlands and the growth of young palms results in 50 percent greater greenhouse gas emissions when compared to mature plantations. This is a growing concern among ecologists and environmentalists as more tropical peatlands are being converted into plantations due to land shortage, in order to meet the increasing demand for palm oil.

Researchers are looking for possible, more environmentally friendly, solutions and ways to help the situation and have suggested that if enough land is conserved and there remain large enough areas of primary forest reserves, the effects of the palm oil industry may not have as much of an impact on wildlife and biodiversity. Environmental groups like Greenpeace, the Roundtable on Sustainable Palm Oil, and Amnesty International are also taking part in advocating bans on unsustainable palm oil crops and the companies that purchase these exports.

Environmental groups such as Greenpeace claim that this deforestation produces far more emissions than biofuels remove. Greenpeace identified Indonesian peatlands—unique tropical forests whose dense soil can be burned to release carbon emissions—which are being destroyed to make way for palm oil plantations. Greenpeace argues the peatlands represent massive carbon sinks, and they claim the destruction already accounts for four percent of annual global CO_{2} emissions. However, according to the Tropical Peat Research Laboratory, at least one measurement has shown that oil palm plantations are carbon sinks because oil palms convert carbon dioxide into oxygen just as other trees do, and, as reported in Malaysia's Second National Communication to the United Nations Framework Convention on Climate Change, oil palm plantations contribute to Malaysia's net carbon sink.

Greenpeace recorded peatland destruction in the Indonesian province of Riau on the island of Sumatra, home to 25 percent of Indonesia's palm oil plantations. Greenpeace claims this would have devastating consequences for Riau's peatlands, which have already been degraded by industrial development and store a massive 14.6 billion tonnes of carbon, roughly one year's greenhouse gas emissions.

Environmentalists and conservationists have been called upon to team up with palm oil companies to purchase small tracts of existing palm plantation, so they can use the profits to create privately owned nature reserves. It has been suggested that this is a more productive strategy than the current confrontational approach that threatens the livelihoods of millions of smallholders.

=== Haze ===
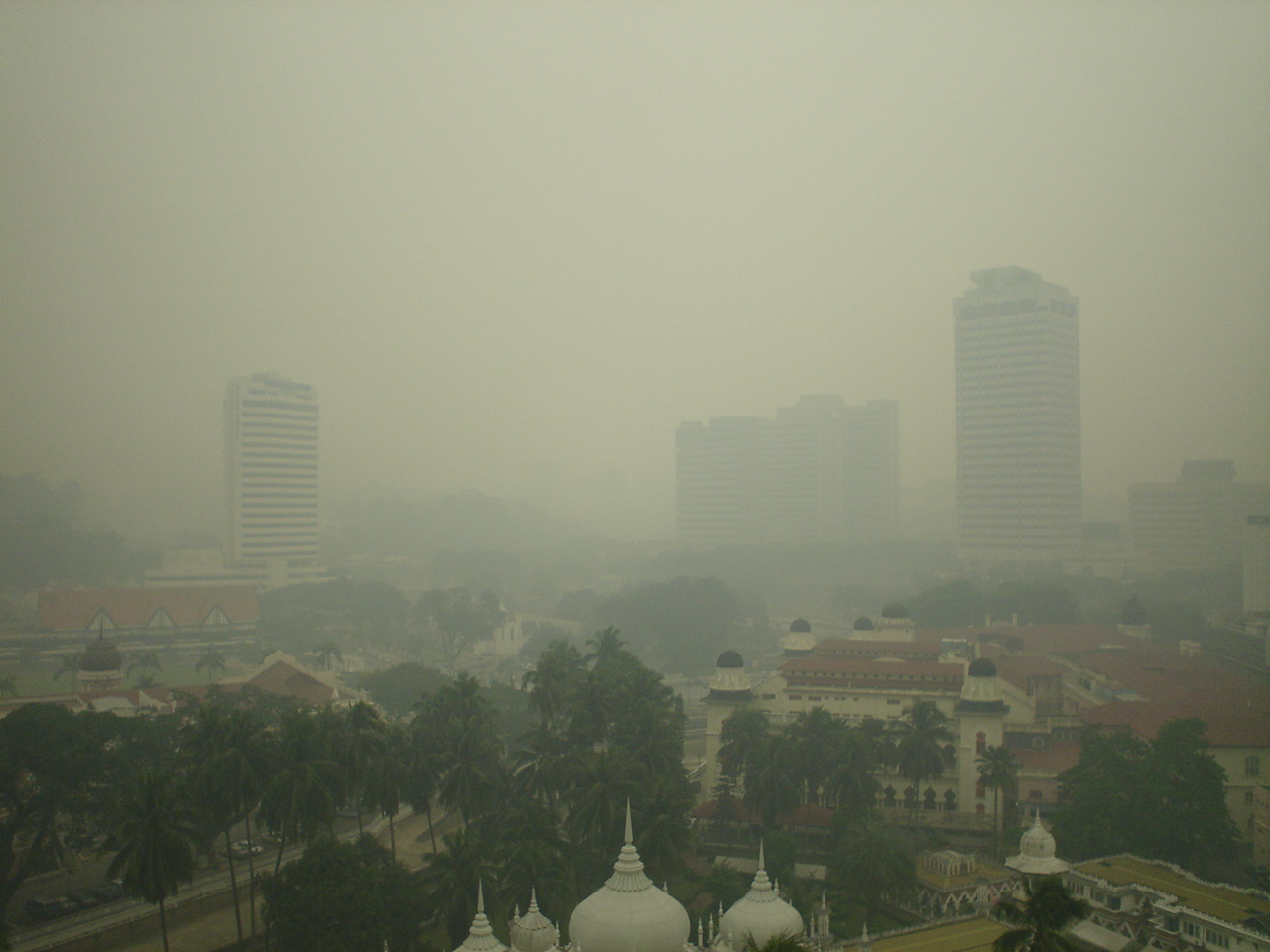
A 2005 air pollution crisis in Kuala Lumpur. Southeast Asian haze is a recurrent issue linked to land clearing for palm oil and pulpwood.

Haze, a form of air pollution, is a major recurrent issue across Southeast Asia, partly linked to burning of rainforest and peat swamp forest to clear land for palm oil plantations.

== National differences ==
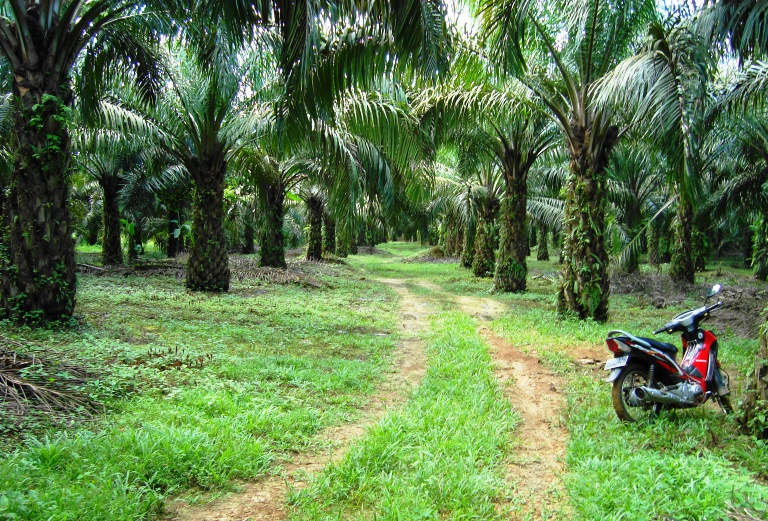
A palm oil plantation in Indonesia

=== Indonesia and Malaysia ===
In the two countries responsible for over 80% of world oil palm production, Indonesia and Malaysia, smallholders account for 35–40% of the total area of planted oil palm and as much as 33% of the output. Elsewhere, as in West African countries that produce mainly for domestic and regional markets, smallholders produce up to 90% of the annual harvest.

As a result of Malaysia's commitment to retain natural forest cover on at least 50% of the nation's land, the growth of new palm oil plantations has slowed in recent years. According to Malaysia's Plantation Industries and Commodities Minister Bernard Dompok, significant expansion of palm oil is no longer possible, therefore Malaysian farmers are now focusing on increasing production without expansion.

In January 2008, the CEO of the Malaysian Palm Oil Council wrote a letter to the Wall Street Journal stating that Malaysia was aware of the need to pursue a sustainable palm oil industry. Since then the Malaysian government, along with palm oil companies, have increased production of certified sustainable palm oil (CSPO). Malaysia has been recognized by the Roundtable on Sustainable Palm Oil as the largest producer of CSPO, producing 50% of the world's supply, and accounting for 40% of CSPO growers worldwide. Indonesia produces 35% of the world's CSPO.

In Indonesia, the Indigenous Peoples' Alliance of the Archipelago (AMAN) under the direction of Mina Susana Setra has fought for policies that find balance between economic need and indigenous people's rights. 99% of the palm oil concessions in the country concern land that is occupied by indigenous people. In 2012, AMAN led an advocacy team which won a Constitutional Court case recognizing customary land rights; however, implementation of programs that protect indigenous rights, the environment and developers have failed to come to fruition except in limited cases.

=== Africa ===
In Africa, the situation is very different compared to Indonesia or Malaysia. In its Human Development Report 2007–2008, the United Nations Development Program says production of palm oil in West Africa is largely sustainable, mainly because it is undertaken on a smallholder level without resorting to diversity-damaging monoculture. The United Nations Food and Agriculture program is encouraging small farmers across Africa to grow palm oil, because the crop offers opportunities to improve livelihoods and incomes for the poor.

== Increasing demand ==
Food and cosmetics companies, including ADM, Unilever, Cargill, Procter & Gamble, Nestlé, Kraft and Burger King, are driving the demand for new palm oil supplies, demand was partly driven by a need for a replacement for high trans fat content oils.

Although palm oil is used in the production of biofuels and proposals have been made to use it in large installations, a 2012 report by the International Food Policy Research Institute concluded that the increase in palm oil production is related to food demands, not biofuel demands.

Demand for palm oil contributes to biodiversity impacts in producing countries through international trade. Assessments of supply chains for oil crops, including oil palm, show that biodiversity impacts associated with consumption are often concentrated in tropical producing regions rather than in the countries where products are ultimately consumed. These impacts depend on the geographical location of cultivation as well as the demand level, with rising consumption contributing to increasing biodiversity pressures over time.

=== Biodiesel ===
Biodiesel made from palm oil grown on sustainable non-forest land and from established plantations reduces greenhouse gas emissions. According to Greenpeace, clearing peatland to plant oil palms releases large amounts of greenhouse gasses, and that biodiesel produced from oil palms grown on this land may not result in a net reduction of greenhouse gas emissions. However, research by Malaysia's Tropical Peat Research Unit has found that oil palm plantations developed on peatland produce lower carbon dioxide emissions than forest peat swamp. However, it has been suggested that this research unit was commissioned by politicians who have interests in the palm oil industry.

In 2011, eight of Malaysia's Federal Land Development Authority (FELDA) plantations were certified under the International Sustainability and Carbon Certification System (ISCC), becoming part of Asia's first ISCC certified supply and production chain for palm biodiesel. This certification system complies with the European Union's Renewable Energy Directive (RED). In 2012, the European Commission approved the RSPO's biofuel certification scheme allowing certified sustainable palm oil biofuel to be sold in Europe.

== Sustainability ==
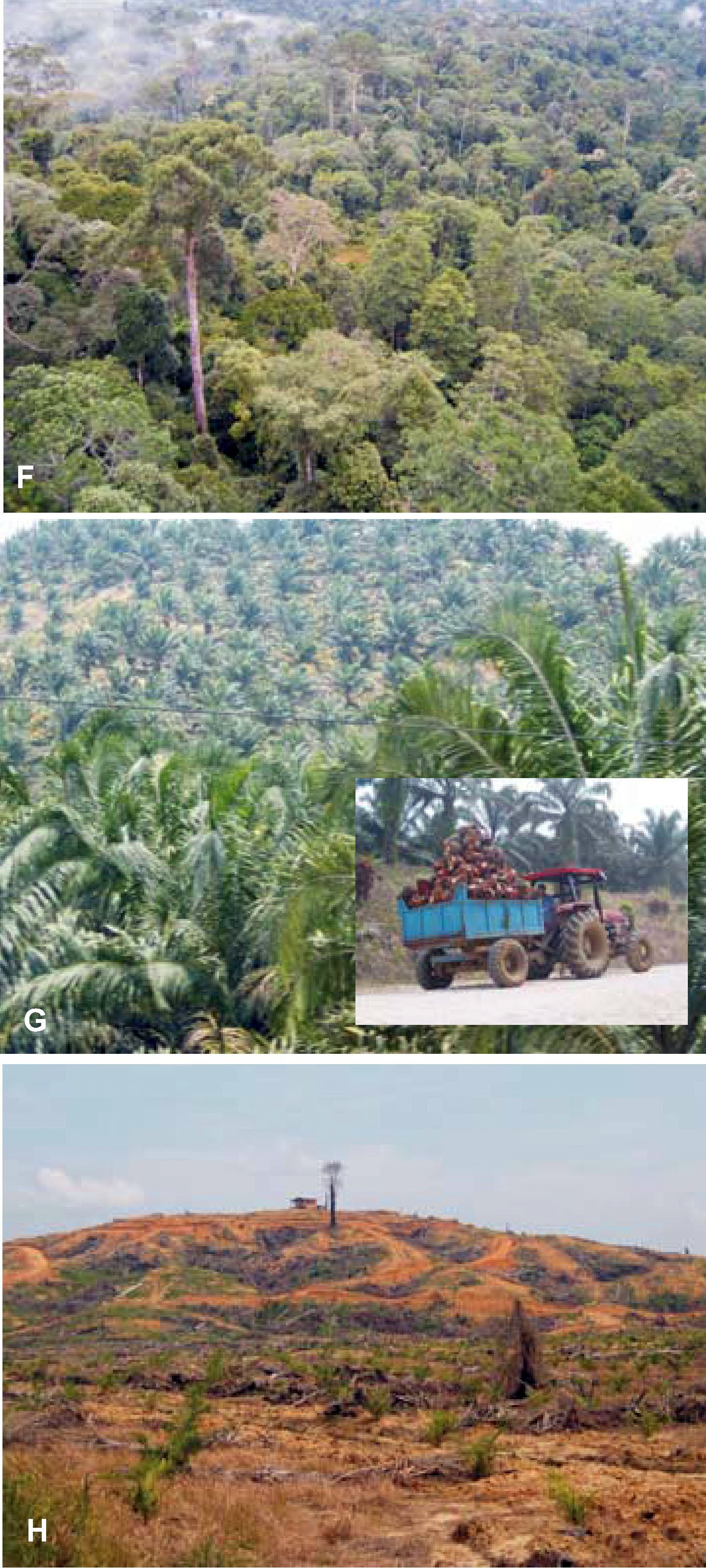
In Borneo, the forest (F), is being replaced by oil palm plantations (G). These changes are irreversible for all practical purposes (H).

At least 17.4% of palm oil fruit produced globally in 2016 complied with voluntary sustainability standards such as the Roundtable on Sustainable Palm Oil, Rainforest Alliance, and organic.

The Roundtable on Sustainable Palm Oil (RSPO), founded in 2004, works to promote the production of sustainably sourced palm oil through involvement with growers, processors, food companies, investors and NGOs. Beginning in 2008, palm oil that meets RSPO introduced standards has been designated "certified sustainable palm oil" (CSPO). Within two years of implementation, CSPO-designated palm oil comprised 7 percent of the global palm oil market. As of October 2012, 12 percent of palm oil has been certified by the RSPO. However, in the first year of CSPO certification only 30 percent of sustainable oil was marketed as CSPO.

In The Economist in 2010, the RSPO was criticized for not setting standards for greenhouse-gas emissions for plantations and because its members account for only 40 percent of palm oil production. In a 2007 report, Greenpeace was critical of RSPO-member food companies saying that they are "dependent on suppliers that are actively engaged in deforestation and the conversion of peatlands".

Following a contribution of $1 billion from Norway, in May 2010, Indonesia announced a two-year suspension on new agreements to clear natural forests and peatlands. Additionally, Indonesia announced plans to create its own organization similar to the RSPO, which, as a government certification system, will introduce mandatory regulation for all Indonesian palm oil producers.

In 2011, Malaysia began developing a national certification, the "Malaysia sustainable palm oil" (MSPO) certification, to improve involvement in sustainable palm oil production nationwide. The certification program, aimed at small and medium-sized producers, is expected to be launched in 2014. Malaysia has initiated its own environmental assessment on oil palm industry based on Life Cycle Assessment (LCA) approaches. LCA has been applied to assess the environmental impact of production of oil palm seedlings, oil palm fresh fruit bunches, crude palm oil, crude palm kernel oil and refined palm oil. The assessment on downstream industries such as bio-diesel, was also conducted.

In July 2020 scientists show via detailed analysis of satellite images that certified "sustainable" palm oil production resulted in deforestation of tropical forests of Sumatra and Borneo and endangered mammals' habitat degradation in the past 30 years.

A 2024 study by the Research Institute for Sustainable Excellence and Leadership questioned the applicability of general indirect land use change (ILUC) assumptions to Malaysian palm oil. The study argued that such assessments often overlook Malaysia's specific land governance and agricultural policies, potentially overstating ILUC impacts. It called for more localized, evidence-based evaluations of palm oil's environmental footprint in the Malaysian context.

=== Carbon credit programs ===
Oil palm producers are eligible to take part in Clean Development Mechanism (CDM) programs in which developed nations invest in clean energy projects in developing nations to earn carbon credits to offset their own greenhouse gas emissions and to reduce greenhouse gas emissions worldwide.

Investors have been cautious about investing in palm oil biofuel projects because of the impact the expansion of oil palm plantations has had on tropical rain forests, but according to the South East Asian CDM development company YTL-SV Carbon, many CDM projects in the palm oil sector focus on improving use of waste products to reduce gas emissions and do not contribute to the establishment of new oil palm plantations.

=== SPOTT: ESG policy transparency assessments ===
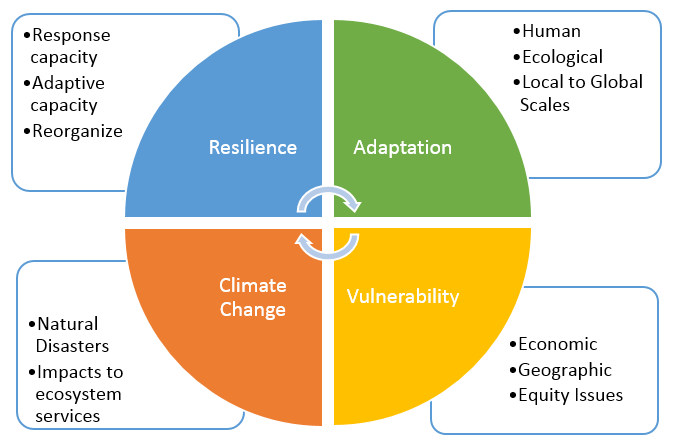
Basics of environmental sustainability

Palm oil output has been gradually increasing since the end of the twentieth century, with a 15-fold rise between 1980 and 2014. (IUCN, 2021). Aside from the main producing countries of Indonesia and Malaysia, Latin American countries are beginning to play a larger role in the global palm oil industry.

SPOTT is a free, online platform that evaluates commodity producers, processors, and traders on their public disclosure on environmental, social, and governance (ESG) issues.

SPOTT evaluates the public disclosure of 100 palm oil producers, processors, and traders in terms of their organization, policies, and practices relating to environmental, social, and governance (ESG) issues. To track their growth over time, each company is given a percentage score.

For palm oil, timber and pulp, and natural rubber companies, SPOTT assessments follow three complete frameworks of best practice indicators. Each framework includes precise scoring criteria for over 100 indicators that are grouped into ten categories.

The SPOTT indicators were created by ZSL in consultation with technical consultants to ensure that they are closely matched with related programs such as the United Nations Sustainable Development Goals.

For a more detailed explanation of assessment scores, click here

Policies and pledges made by the company may not be carried out effectively on the ground. Although the media monitor on each company's page may provide some insight, independent due diligence should include measures to analyze implementation levels.

=== Use of sustainable oil by corporations ===
The World Wildlife Foundation (WWF) publishes an annual report on the use of sustainable palm oil by major corporations. In the 2011 report, 31 of the 132 companies surveyed received a top score for their use of sustainable palm oil. This represents an increase from 2009, the first year the report was issued, where no companies received top scores.

The WWF reports that 87 companies have committed to using only sustainable palm oil by 2015, including Unilever and Nestlé, both of which committed to exclusively using sustainable palm oil following demonstrations and urgings from environmental organizations in the late 2000s. However, according to the WWF, the overall growth in the use of sustainable palm oil is too slow.

Retailers who have made commitments to offering products containing sustainable oil, including Walmart and Carrefour, have attributed the slow rate of growth in the availability of sustainable palm oil to a lack of consumer interest and awareness in products made with sustainable palm oil. These companies have expressed concern about the potential impact of low consumer demand on the cost and future availability of sustainable palm oil.

=== Persuading governments ===
It may be possible to persuade governments of nations that produce competing products to enact protectionist legislation against the products of deforestation, an approach that was presented in a report by the National Farmers Union (United States) and Avoided Deforestation Partners. The 2010 report estimates that protecting the 13,000,000 hectares (50,000 sq mi) of mostly tropical forest that are lost annually worldwide would boost American agricultural revenue by $190–270 billion between 2012 and 2030. However, several conservation groups, including Conservation International, Environmental Defense Fund, National Wildlife Federation, and The Nature Conservancy, presented a rebuttal to the report, stating that it was "based on the assumption, totally unfounded, that deforestation in tropical countries can be easily interrupted, and its conclusions are therefore also unrealistic."

== See also ==
- 2015 Southeast Asian haze
- Environmental issues with energy
- Food vs. fuel
- Southeast Asian haze
- Sustainable biofuel
- The Burning Season, a 2008 documentary that highlights deforestation in Indonesia for palm oil plantations
- Pig Feast, a 2026 Indonesian documentary film

Companies:

- Criticisms of Cargill
- Wilmar International
