= Bonsucro =

- Formation: 2008
- Type: Multi-stakeholder initiative
- Purpose: Sustainable agriculture, Sustainable biofuels, Sugar cane
- Headquarters: London
- Website: bonsucro.com
- Formerly called: Better Sugar Cane Initiative (BSI)

Established in 2008, Bonsucro is a global non-profit, multi-stakeholder governance group promoting sustainable sugar cane, including production, processing and trade around the world.

Bonsucro has a strong local presence in the countries that produce, use and consume the most sugarcane and its products. Offices can be found in the United Kingdom (London) and Brazil (Ribeirão Preto), with staff also based in India and Mexico.

Both Bonsucro and the standards set by the Roundtable on Sustainable Biomaterials have been noted as in practise expanding the EU RED guidelines to include other factors, such as land tenure issues as prescribed by national law.

A 2024 article by The New York Times reported that Bonsucro's audit process certifies companies which support in labor practices including debt bondage, forced hysterectomy, and brutal working conditions. Bonsucro’s CEO, Danielle Morley, was aware that forced hysterectomies were a problem in parts of India. In response to these allegations, Bonsucro has developed a response plan designed to facilitate access to remedy for rightsholders, strengthen their systems of standards, assurance and due diligence processes, where needed and in line with UN Guiding Principles and drive positive change for sugarcane workers.

== Statistics ==
Since 2011, Bonsucro has certified over 800 millions tonnes of sugarcane, and over 55 million tonnes of sugar.

In 2021, the number of certified mills rose to 145. Certified mills were found to have reduced their water use by 53 % after five years of certification. 71 % of certified mills produced enough energy to export to the national grid.

Through ongoing certification, producers demonstrate the ability to reduce their nitrogen fertiliser use per hectare, from an average of 81 kg N/ha at initial certification to an average of 67 kg N/ha after five years. In 2020, certified producers used an average of 3.5kg active ingredient/ha for both pesticides and herbicides - well within the standard threshold of using less than 5 kg active ingredient per hectare.

Through Bonsucro membership and certification, over 32,000 seasonal workers in sugarcane production and processing now have proper contracts and are paid at least the national minimum wage. 182,800 workers are covered by health and safety plans and have access to first aid.

== Bonsucro Membership ==
Bonsucro has over 300 members from 55 countries.

== Other Mentions ==
EU market access has been labeled as important by Colombian policy-makers, and described as driving the country's national policy aiming for 40% Bonsucro sugarcane. However, this use of certification in the context of biofuels has caused concern regarding the consequences of intensification in Colombia, although as of November 2014 no mills had yet achieved certification in the country. The first Bonsucro certified ethanol fuel, from Brazil, was first imported into Europe through the Port of Rotterdam in 2012.
