= Pacific Renewable Energy =

Pacific Renewable Energy Pty Ltd
- Type: Private
- Industry: Energy
- Founded: 06/01/2006 however research into viability of Pongamia pinnata and other biofuel feedstocks was done from 2003 and earlier.
- Headquarters: Caboolture, Queensland, Australia
- Products: Genetically selected varieties of Pongamia pinnata / Millettia pinnata.
- Website: www.pacificrenewableenergy.com.au

== History ==
In 2003 the directors of PRE, who were the primary founders of The Australian Biodiesel Group Limited, began their search for a sustainable replacement for used cooking oil and Tallow which are currently used for biodiesel production in Australia. Their search ended on finding Pongamia pinnata and visiting the fledgling Pongamia oil industry in India. They followed up this with a search for viable Australian native trees and then in the formation of Pacific Renewable Energy in January 2006. After learning the high variability of seed grown trees, they talked to Professor Peter Gresshoff of the University of Queensland's legume research division.

== Research ==
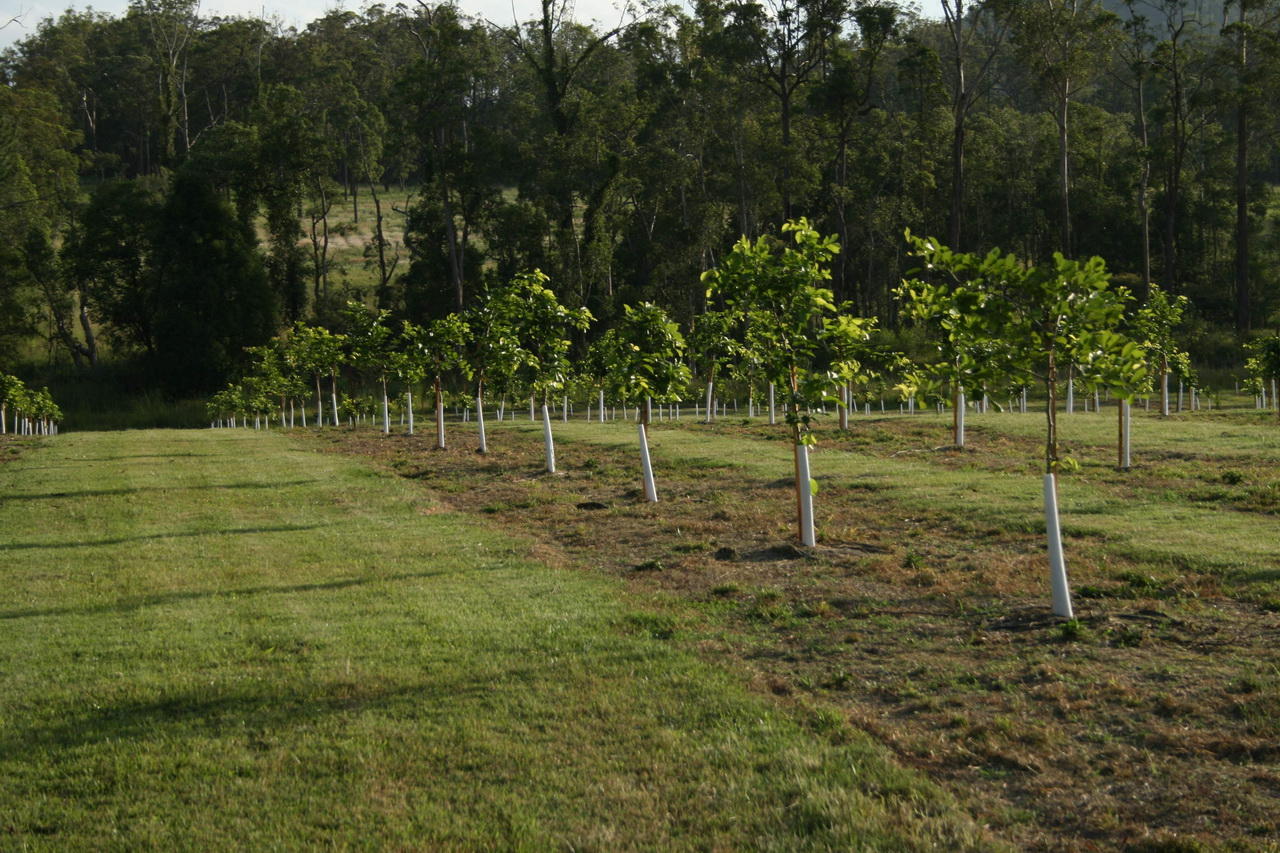
Pacific Renewable Energy Trial Plantation Caboolture QLD

PRE has teamed up with and The ARC Centre Of Excellence For Integrative Legume Research (CILR) to help identify and develop commercially viable genetic strains and develop clonal propagation methods appropriate for commercial production of Pongamia pinnata in Australia. This has involved salt tolerance tests, mapping of the Pongamia's Genome and a number of other associated projects. According to Professor Peter Gresshoff and many who have worked with Pongamia, this research is vital for the establishment of a long-term commercial industry, particularly given the 4-6 year lead time before significant yields are realised.

PRE has partnered with CILR to plant a pilot plantation at Roma with Origin Energy. PRE also has its own trial plantation at Caboolture and trials in a number of other locations.
