= Sustainable biofuel =

Non-fossil-based sustainable production

Sustainable biofuel refers to biofuels produced in ways that minimise environmental and social impacts while providing a renewable alternative to fossil fuels. Unlike conventional biofuels, which may compete with food production or contribute to deforestation, sustainable biofuels are derived from feedstocks and processes designed to reduce greenhouse gas emissions, protect biodiversity, and support long-term resource availability. Examples include fuels made from non-food crops, agricultural and forestry residues, algae, and waste materials. International initiatives such as the Roundtable on Sustainable Biomaterials have developed standards and certification schemes to assess sustainability across the biofuel supply chain. The concept is closely linked to broader debates on energy security, climate change mitigation, and the transition to low-carbon economies.

== Sustainability standards ==
In 2008, the Roundtable for Sustainable Biofuels released its proposed standards for sustainable biofuels. This includes 12 principles:

1. "Biofuel production shall follow international treaties and national laws regarding such things as air quality, water resources, agricultural practices, labor conditions, and more.
2. Biofuels projects shall be designed and operated in participatory processes that involve all relevant stakeholders in planning and monitoring.
3. Biofuels shall significantly reduce greenhouse gas emissions as compared to fossil fuels. The principle seeks to establish a standard methodology for comparing greenhouse gases (GHG) benefits.
4. Biofuel production shall not violate human rights or labor rights, and shall ensure decent work and the well-being of workers.
5. Biofuel production shall contribute to the social and economic development of local, rural and indigenous peoples and communities.
6. Biofuel production shall not impair food security.
7. Biofuel production shall avoid negative impacts on biodiversity, ecosystems and areas of high conservation value.
8. Biofuel production shall promote practices that improve soil health and minimize degradation.
9. Surface and groundwater use will be optimized and contamination or depletion of water resources minimized.
10. Air pollution shall be minimized along the supply chain.
11. Biofuels shall be produced in the most cost-effective way, with a commitment to improve production efficiency and social and environmental performance in all stages of the biofuel value chain.
12. Biofuel production shall not violate land rights".

Several countries and regions have introduced policies or adopted standards to promote sustainable biofuels production and use, most prominently the European Union and the United States. The 2009 EU Renewable Energy Directive, which requires 10 percent of transportation energy from renewable energy by 2020, is the most comprehensive mandatory sustainability standard in place as of 2010.

The EU Renewable Energy Directive requires that the lifecycle greenhouse gas emissions of biofuels consumed be at least 50 percent less than the equivalent emissions from gasoline or diesel by 2017 (and 35 percent less starting in 2011). Also, the feedstocks for biofuels "should not be harvested from lands with high biodiversity value, from carbon-rich or forested land, or from wetlands".

As with the EU, the U.S. Renewable Fuel Standard (RFS) and the California Low Carbon Fuel Standard (LCFS) both require specific levels of lifecycle greenhouse gas reductions compared to equivalent fossil fuel consumption. The RFS requires that at least half of the biofuels production mandated by 2022 should reduce lifecycle emissions by 50 percent. The LCFS is a performance standard that calls for a minimum of 10 percent emissions reduction per unit of transport energy by 2020. Both the U.S. and California standards currently address only greenhouse gas emissions, but California plans to "expand its policy to address other sustainability issues associated with liquid biofuels in the future".

In 2009, Brazil also adopted new sustainability policies for sugarcane ethanol, including "zoning regulation of sugarcane expansion and social protocols".

== Motivation ==
Biofuels, in the form of liquid fuels derived from plant materials, are entering the market, driven by factors such as oil price spikes and the need for increased energy security. Many of these first-generation biofuels that are currently being supplied have been criticised for their adverse impacts on the natural environment, food security, and land use.

The challenge is to support second, third and fourth-generation biofuel development. Second-generation biofuels include new cellulosic technologies, with responsible policies and economic instruments to help ensure that biofuel commercialization is sustainable. Responsible commercialization of biofuels represents an opportunity to enhance sustainable economic prospects in Africa, Latin America and Asia.

Biofuels have a limited ability to replace fossil fuels and should not be regarded as a 'silver bullet' to deal with transport emissions. They offer a prospect of increased market competition and oil price moderation. A healthy supply of alternative energy sources will help to combat gasoline price spikes and reduce dependency on fossil fuels, especially in the transport sector. Using transportation fuels more efficiently is also an integral part of a sustainable transport strategy.

== Options ==
Biofuel development and use is a complex issue because there are many biofuel options which are available. Biofuels, such as ethanol and biodiesel, are currently produced from the products of conventional food crops such as the starch, sugar and oil feedstocks from crops that include wheat, maize, sugar cane, palm oil and oilseed rape. Some researchers fear that a major switch to biofuels from such crops would create a direct competition with their use for food and animal feed, and claim that in some parts of the world the economic consequences are already visible, other researchers look at the land available and the enormous areas of idle and abandoned land and claim that there is room for a large proportion of biofuel also from conventional crops.

Second generation biofuels are now being produced from a much broader range of feedstocks including the cellulose in dedicated energy crops (perennial grasses such as switchgrass and Miscanthus giganteus), forestry materials, the co-products from food production, and domestic vegetable waste. Advances in the conversion processes will improve the sustainability of biofuels, through better efficiencies and reduced environmental impact of producing biofuels, from both existing food crops and from cellulosic sources. One promising development in biobutanol production technology was discovered in the late summer of 2011—Tulane University's alternative fuel research scientists discovered a strain of Clostridium bacteria, called "TU-103", a key feature of the discovery is that the "TU-103" organism can convert nearly any form of cellulose into butanol, and is the only known strain of Clostridium-genus bacteria that can do so in the presence of oxygen. The university's researchers have stated that the source of the "TU-103" Clostridium bacteria strain was most likely from the solid waste from one of the plains zebra at New Orleans' Audubon Zoo.

In 2007, Ronald Oxburgh suggested in The Courier-Mail that production of biofuels could be either responsible or irresponsible and had several trade-offs: "Produced responsibly they are a sustainable energy source that need not divert any land from growing food nor damage the environment; they can also help solve the problems of the waste generated by Western society; and they can create jobs for the poor where previously were none. Produced irresponsibly, they at best offer no climate benefit and, at worst, have detrimental social and environmental consequences. In other words, biofuels are pretty much like any other product. In 2008 the Nobel prize-winning chemist Paul J. Crutzen published findings that the release of nitrous oxide (N_{2}O) emissions in the production of biofuels means that they contribute more to global warming than the fossil fuels they replace.

According to the Rocky Mountain Institute, sound biofuel production practices would not hamper food and fibre production, nor cause water or environmental problems, and would enhance soil fertility. The selection of land on which to grow the feedstocks is a critical component of the ability of biofuels to deliver sustainable solutions. A key consideration is the minimisation of biofuel competition for prime cropland.

Biofuels are different from fossil fuels in regard to carbon emissions being short term, but are similar to fossil fuels in that biofuels contribute to air pollution. Raw biofuels burned to generate steam for heat and power, produces airborne carbon particulates, carbon monoxide and nitrous oxides. The WHO estimates 3.7 million premature deaths worldwide in 2012 due to air pollution.

== Ingredients ==
=== Sugarcane in Brazil ===
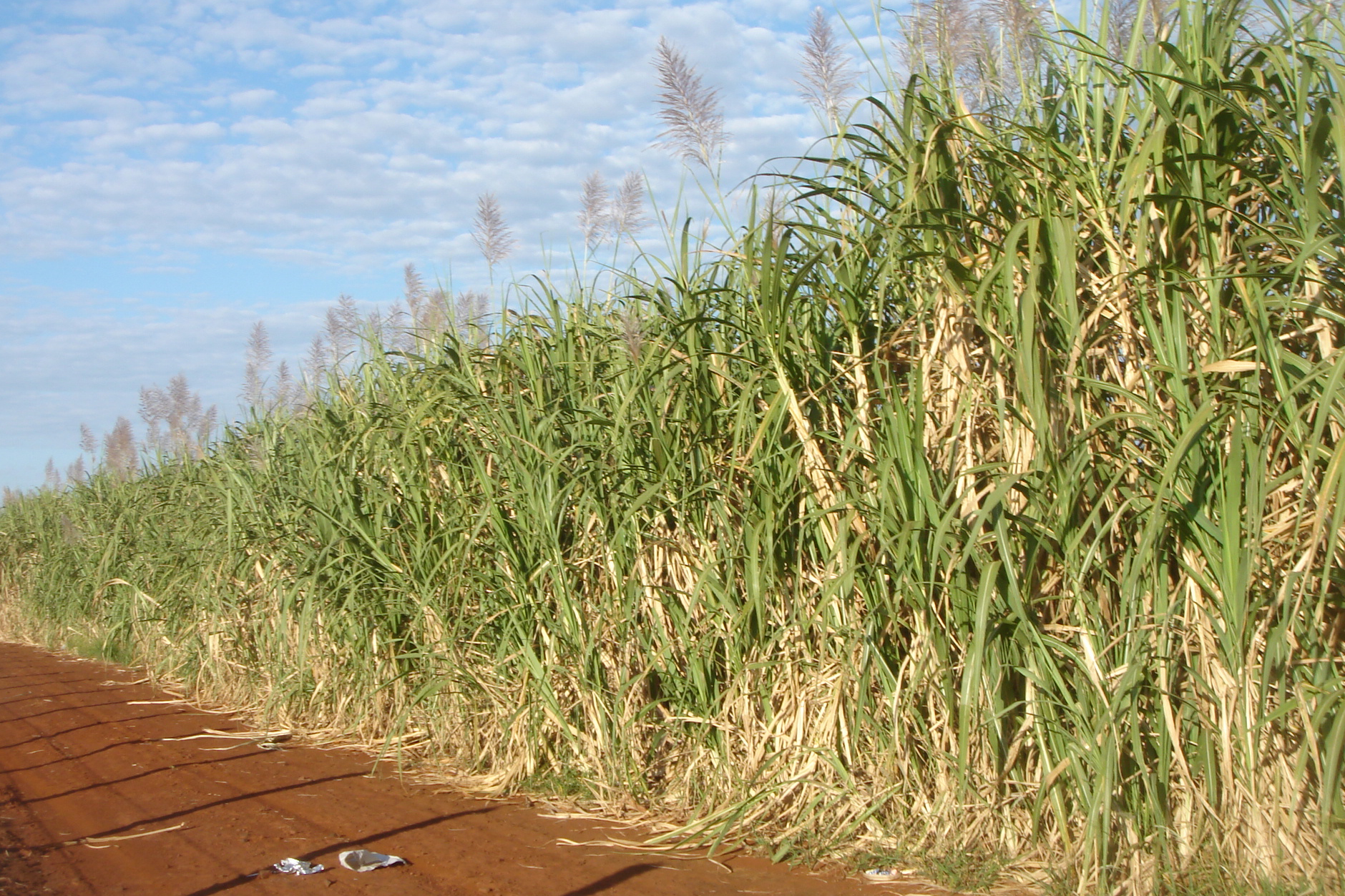
Sugarcane (Saccharum officinarum) plantation ready for harvest, Ituverava, São Paulo State, Brazil.

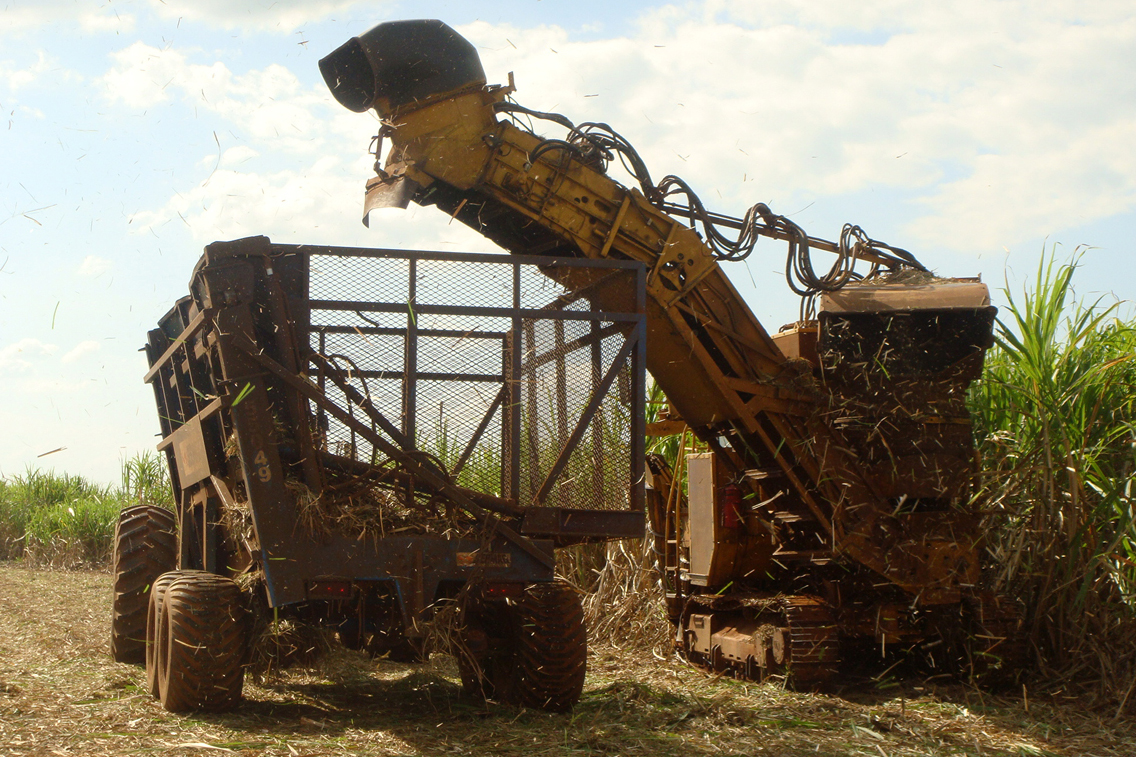
Mechanized harvesting of sugarcane, Piracicaba, São Paulo, Brazil.

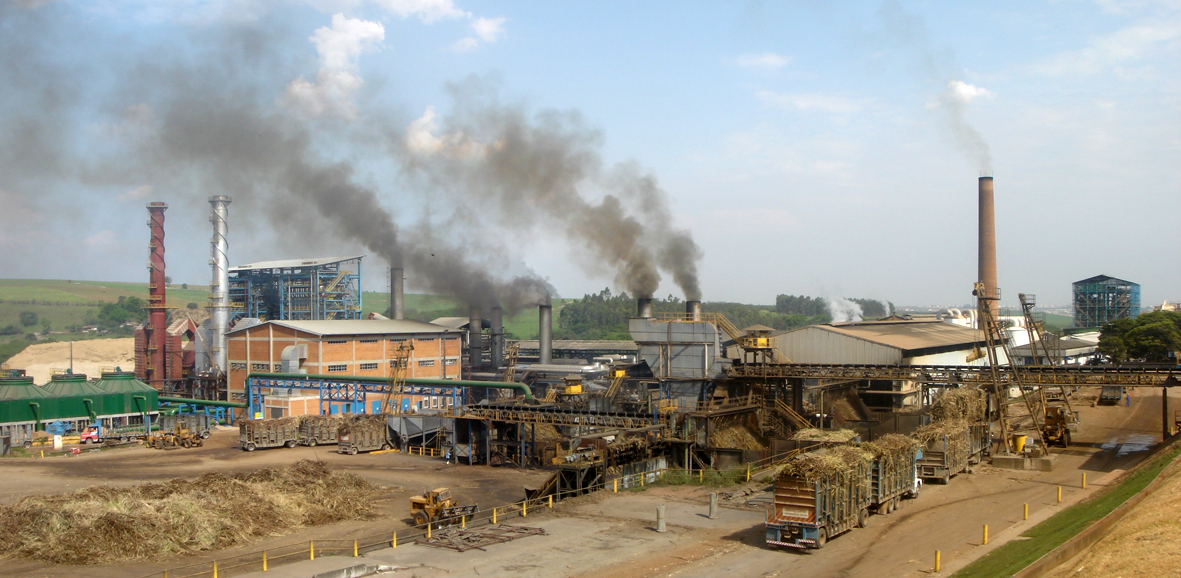
Cosan's Costa Pinto sugar cane mill and ethanol distillery plant at Piracicaba, São Paulo, Brazil.

Brazil's production of ethanol fuel from sugarcane dates back to the 1970s, as a governmental response to the 1973 oil crisis. Brazil is considered the biofuel industry leader and the world's first sustainable biofuels economy. In 2010 the U.S. Environmental Protection Agency designated Brazilian sugarcane ethanol as an advanced biofuel due to EPA's estimated 61% reduction of total life cycle greenhouse gas emissions, including direct indirect land use change emissions. Brazil sugarcane ethanol fuel program success and sustainability is based on the most efficient agricultural technology for sugarcane cultivation in the world, uses modern equipment and cheap sugar cane as feedstock, the residual cane-waste (bagasse) is used to process heat and power, which results in a very competitive price and also in a high energy balance (output energy/input energy), which varies from 8.3 for average conditions to 10.2 for best practice production.

A report commissioned by the United Nations, based on a detailed review of published research up to mid-2009 as well as the input of independent experts world-wide, found that ethanol from sugar cane as produced in Brazil "in some circumstances does better than just "zero emission". If grown and processed correctly, it has negative emission, pulling CO_{2} out of the atmosphere, rather than adding it. In contrast, the report found that U.S. use of maize for biofuel is less efficient, as sugarcane can lead to emissions reductions of between 70% and well over 100% when substituted for gasoline. Several other studies have shown that sugarcane-based ethanol reduces greenhouse gases by 86 to 90% if there is no significant land use change.

In another study commissioned by the Dutch government in 2006 to evaluate the sustainability of Brazilian bioethanol concluded that there is sufficient water to supply all foreseeable long-term water requirements for sugarcane and ethanol production. This evaluation also found that consumption of agrochemicals for sugar cane production is lower than in citric, corn, coffee and soybean cropping. The study found that development of resistant sugar cane varieties is a crucial aspect of disease and pest control and is one of the primary objectives of Brazil's cane genetic improvement programs. Disease control is one of the main reasons for the replacement of a commercial variety of sugar cane.

Another concern is the fact that sugarcane fields are traditionally burned just before harvest to avoid harm to the workers, by removing the sharp leaves and killing snakes and other harmful animals, and also to fertilize the fields with ash. Mechanization will reduce pollution from burning fields and has higher productivity than people, and due to mechanization the number of temporary workers in the sugarcane plantations has already declined. By the 2008 harvest season, around 47% of the cane was collected with harvesting machines.

Regarding the negative impacts of the potential direct and indirect effect of land use changes on carbon emissions, the study commissioned by the Dutch government concluded that "it is very difficult to determine the indirect effects of further land use for sugar cane production (i.e. sugar cane replacing another crop like soy or citrus crops, which in turn causes additional soy plantations replacing pastures, which in turn may cause deforestation), and also not logical to attribute all these soil carbon losses to sugar cane". The Brazilian agency Embrapa estimates that there is enough agricultural land available to increase at least 30 times the existing sugarcane plantation without endangering sensible ecosystems or taking land destined for food crops. Most future growth is expected to take place on abandoned pasture lands, as it has been the historical trend in São Paulo state. Also, productivity is expected to improve even further based on current biotechnology research, genetic improvement, and better agronomic practices, thus contributing to reduce land demand for future sugarcane cultures.

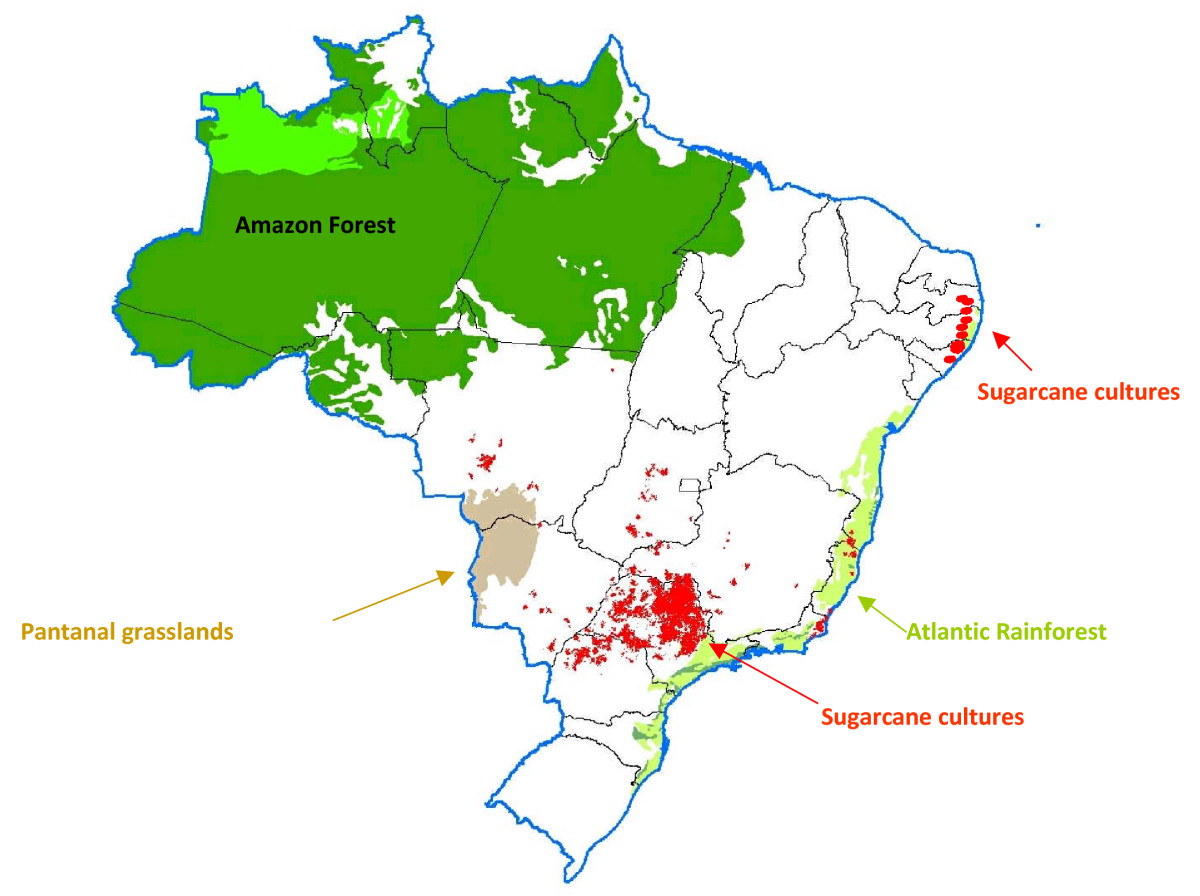
Location of environmentally valuable areas with respect to sugarcane plantations. São Paulo, located in the Southeast Region of Brazil, concentrates two-thirds of sugarcane cultures.

Another concern is the risk of clearing rain forests and other environmentally valuable land for sugarcane production, such as the Amazon rainforest, the Pantanal or the Cerrado. Embrapa has rebutted this concern explaining that 99.7% of sugarcane plantations are located at least 2,000 km from the Amazon, and expansion during the last 25 years took place in the Center-South region, also far away from the Amazon rainforest, the Pantanal or the Atlantic forest. In São Paulo state growth took place in abandoned pasture lands. The impact assessment commissioned by the Dutch government supported this argument.

In order to guarantee a sustainable development of ethanol production, in September 2009 the government issued by decree a countrywide agroecological land use zoning to restrict sugarcane growth in or near environmentally sensitive areas. According to the new criteria, 92.5% of the Brazilian territory is not suitable for sugarcane plantation. The government considers that the suitable areas are more than enough to meet the future demand for ethanol and sugar in the domestic and international markets foreseen for the next decades.

Regarding the food vs fuel issue, a World Bank research report published in July 2008 found that "Brazil's sugar-based ethanol did not push food prices appreciably higher". This research paper also concluded that Brazil's sugar cane–based ethanol has not raised sugar prices significantly. An economic assessment report also published in July 2008 by the OECD agrees with the World Bank report regarding the negative effects of subsidies and trade restrictions, but found that the impact of biofuels on food prices are much smaller. A study by the Brazilian research unit of the Fundação Getúlio Vargas regarding the effects of biofuels on grain prices concluded that the major driver behind the 2007–2008 rise in food prices was speculative activity on futures markets under conditions of increased demand in a market with low grain stocks. The study also concluded that there is no correlation between Brazilian sugarcane cultivated area and average grain prices, as on the contrary, the spread of sugarcane was accompanied by rapid growth of grain crops in the country.

=== Jatropha ===
==== India and Africa ====
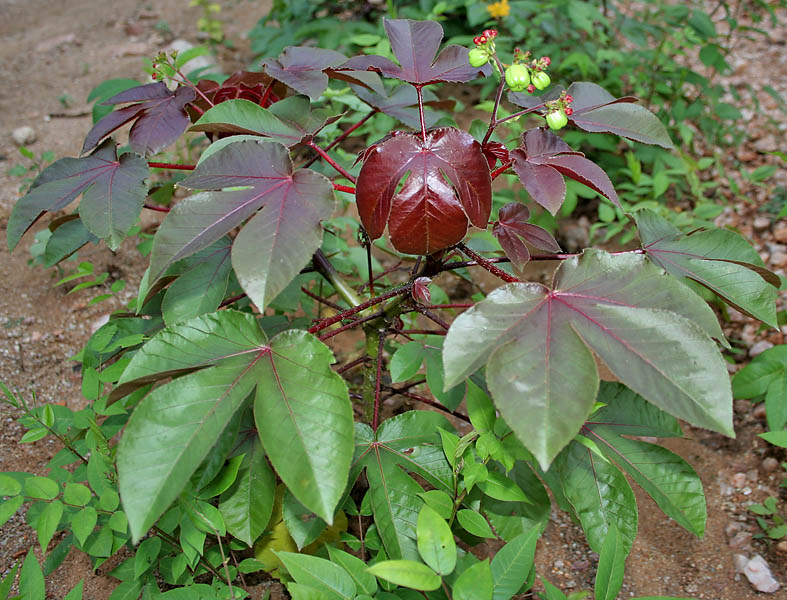
Jatropha gossipifolia in Hyderabad, India.

Crops like Jatropha, used for biodiesel, can thrive on marginal agricultural land where many trees and crops won't grow, or would produce only slow growth yields. Jatropha cultivation provides benefits for local communities:

Cultivation and fruit picking by hand is labour-intensive and needs around one person per hectare. In parts of rural India and Africa this provides much-needed jobs – about 200,000 people worldwide now find employment through jatropha. Moreover, villagers often find that they can grow other crops in the shade of the trees. Their communities will avoid importing expensive diesel and there will be some for export too.

==== Cambodia ====
Cambodia has no proven fossil fuel reserves, and is almost completely dependent on imported diesel fuel for electricity production. Consequently, Cambodians face an insecure supply and pay some of the highest energy prices in the world. The impacts of this are widespread and may hinder economic development.

Biofuels may provide a substitute for diesel fuel that can be manufactured locally for a lower price, independent of the international oil price. The local production and use of biofuel also offers other benefits such as improved energy security, rural development opportunities and environmental benefits. The Jatropha curcas species appears to be a particularly suitable source of biofuel as it already grows commonly in Cambodia. Local sustainable production of biofuel in Cambodia, based on the Jatropha or other sources, offers good potential benefits for the investors, the economy, rural communities and the environment.

==== Mexico ====
Jatropha is native to Mexico and Central America and was likely transported to India and Africa in the 1500s by Portuguese sailors convinced it had medicinal uses. In 2008, recognizing the need to diversify its sources of energy and reduce emissions, Mexico passed a law to push developing biofuels that don't threaten food security and the agriculture ministry has since identified some 2.6 million hectares (6.4 million acres) of land with a high potential to produce jatropha. The Yucatán Peninsula, for instance, in addition to being a corn-producing region, also contains abandoned sisal plantations, where the growing of Jatropha for biodiesel production would not displace food.

On April 1, 2011, Interjet completed the first Mexican aviation biofuels test flight on an Airbus A320. The fuel was a 70:30 traditional jet fuel biojet blend produced from Jatropha oil provided by three Mexican producers, Global Energías Renovables (a wholly owned subsidiary of U.S.-based Global Clean Energy Holdings), Bencafser S.A. and Energy JH S.A. Honeywell's UOP processed the oil into Bio-SPK (Synthetic Paraffinic Kerosene). Global Energías Renovables operates the largest Jatropha farm in the Americas.

On August 1, 2011, Aeromexico, Boeing, and the Mexican Government participated in the first biojet powered transcontinental flight in aviation history. The flight from Mexico City to Madrid used a blend of 70 percent traditional fuel and 30 percent biofuel (aviation biofuel). The biojet was produced entirely from Jatropha oil.

=== Pongamia Pinnata in Australia and India ===
Pongamia pinnata seeds in Brisbane, Australia.

Pongamia pinnata is a legume native to Australia, India, Florida (USA) and most tropical regions, and is now being invested in as an alternative to Jatropha for areas such as Northern Australia, where Jatropha is classed as a noxious weed. Commonly known as simply 'Pongamia', this tree is currently being commercialised in Australia by Pacific Renewable Energy, for use as a Diesel replacement for running in modified Diesel engines or for conversion to Biodiesel using 1st or 2nd Generation Biodiesel techniques, for running in unmodified Diesel engines.

=== Sweet sorghum in India ===
Sweet sorghum overcomes many of the shortcomings of other biofuel crops. With sweet sorghum, only the stalks are used for biofuel production, while the grain is saved for food or livestock feed. It is not in high demand in the global food market, and thus has little impact on food prices and food security. Sweet sorghum is grown on already-farmed drylands that are low in carbon storage capacity, so concerns about the clearing of rainforest do not apply. Sweet sorghum is easier and cheaper to grow than other biofuel crops in India and does not require irrigation, an important consideration in dry areas. Some of the Indian sweet sorghum varieties are now grown in Uganda for ethanol production.

A study by researchers at the International Crops Research Institute for the Semi-Arid Tropics (ICRISAT) found that growing sweet sorghum instead of grain sorghum could increase farmers incomes by US$40 per hectare per crop because it can provide food, feed and fuel. With grain sorghum currently grown on over 11 million hectares (ha) in Asia and on 23.4 million ha in Africa, a switch to sweet sorghum could have a considerable economic impact.

== International collaboration ==
=== Roundtable on Sustainable Materials ===
Public attitudes and the actions of key stakeholders can play a crucial role in realising the potential of sustainable biofuels. Informed discussion and dialogue, based both on scientific research and an understanding of public and stakeholder views, is important.

The Roundtable on Sustainable Materials, previously Roundtable on Sustainable Biofuels, is an international initiative which brings together farmers, companies, governments, non-governmental organizations, and scientists who are interested in the sustainability of biofuels production and distribution. During 2008, the Roundtable used meetings, teleconferences, and online discussions to develop a series of principles and criteria for sustainable biofuels production.

In April 2011, the Roundtable on Sustainable Biofuels launched a set of comprehensive sustainability criteria – the "RSB Certification System." Biofuels producers that meet to these criteria are able to show buyers and regulators that their product has been obtained without harming the environment or violating human rights.

=== Sustainable Biofuels Consensus ===
The Sustainable Biofuels Consensus is an international initiative which calls upon governments, the private sector, and other stakeholders to take decisive action to ensure the sustainable trade, production, and use of biofuels. In this way biofuels may play a key role in energy sector transformation, climate stabilization, and resulting worldwide revitalisation of rural areas.

The Sustainable Biofuels Consensus envisions a "landscape that provides food, fodder, fiber, and energy, which offers opportunities for rural development; that diversifies energy supply, restores ecosystems, protects biodiversity, and sequesters carbon".

=== Better Sugarcane Initiative / Bonsucro ===
In 2008, a multi-stakeholder process was initiated by the World Wildlife Fund and the International Finance Corporation, the private development arm of the World Bank, bringing together industry, supply chain intermediaries, end-users, farmers and civil society organisations to develop standards for certifying the derivative products of sugar cane, one of which is ethanol fuel.

The Bonsucro standard is based around a definition of sustainability which is founded on five principles:

1. Obey the law
2. Respect human rights and labour standards
3. Manage input, production and processing efficiencies to enhance sustainability
4. Actively manage biodiversity and ecosystem services
5. Continuously improve key areas of the business

Biofuel producers that wish to sell products marked with the Bonsucro standard must both ensure that they produce to the Production Standard, and that their downstream buyers meet the Chain of Custody Standard. In addition, if they wish to sell to the European market and count against the EU Renewable Energy Directive, then they must adhere to the Bonsucro EU standard, which includes specific greenhouse gas calculations following European Commission calculation guidelines.

== Oil price moderation ==
Biofuels offer the prospect of real market competition and oil price moderation. According to The Wall Street Journal, crude oil would be trading 15 per cent higher and gasoline would be as much as 25 per cent more expensive, if it were not for biofuels. A healthy supply of alternative energy sources will help to combat gasoline price spikes.

== Sustainable transport ==
Biofuels have a limited ability to replace fossil fuels and should not be regarded as a 'silver bullet' to deal with transport emissions. Biofuels on their own cannot deliver a sustainable transport system and so must be developed as part of an integrated approach, which promotes other renewable energy options and energy efficiency, as well as reducing the overall energy demand and need for transport. Consideration needs to be given to the development of hybrid and fuel cell vehicles, public transport, and better town and rural planning.

In December 2008, an Air New Zealand jet completed the world's first commercial aviation test flight partially using jatropha-based fuel. More than a dozen performance tests were undertaken in the two-hour test flight which departed from Auckland International Airport. A biofuel blend of 50:50 jatropha and Jet A1 fuel was used to power one of the Boeing 747-400's Rolls-Royce RB211 engines. Air New Zealand set several criteria for its jatropha, requiring that "the land it came from was neither forest nor virgin grassland in the previous 20 years, that the soil and climate it came from is not suitable for the majority of food crops and that the farms are rain fed and not mechanically irrigated". The company has also set general sustainability criteria, saying that such biofuels must not compete with food resources, that they must be as good as traditional jet fuels, and that they should be cost competitive.

In January 2009, Continental Airlines used a sustainable biofuel to power a commercial aircraft for the first time in North America. This demonstration flight marks the first sustainable biofuel demonstration flight by a commercial carrier using a twin-engined aircraft, a Boeing 737-800, powered by CFM International CFM56-7B engines. The biofuel blend included components derived from algae and jatropha plants. The algae oil was provided by Sapphire Energy, and the jatropha oil by Terasol Energy.

In March 2011, Yale University research showed significant potential for sustainable aviation fuel based on jatropha-curcas. According to the research, if cultivated properly, "jatropha can deliver many benefits in Latin America and greenhouse gas reductions of up to 60 percent when compared to petroleum-based jet fuel". Actual farming conditions in Latin America were assessed using sustainability criteria developed by the Roundtable on Sustainable Biofuels. Unlike previous research, which used theoretical inputs, the Yale team conducted many interviews with jatropha farmers and used "field measurements to develop the first comprehensive sustainability analysis of actual projects".

As of June 2011, revised international aviation fuel standards officially allow commercial airlines to blend conventional jet fuel with up to 50 percent biofuels. The renewable fuels "can be blended with conventional commercial and military jet fuel through requirements in the newly issued edition of ASTM D7566, Specification for Aviation Turbine Fuel Containing Synthesized Hydrocarbons".

In December 2011, the FAA awarded $7.7 million to eight companies to advance the development of commercial aviation biofuels, with a special focus on alcohol to jet fuel. The FAA is assisting in the development of a sustainable fuel (from alcohols, sugars, biomass, and organic matter such as pyrolysis oils) that can be "dropped in" to aircraft without changing current practices and infrastructure. The research will test how the new fuels affect engine durability and quality control standards.

GreenSky London, a biofuels plant under construction in 2014, aimed to take in some 500,000 tonnes of municipal rubbish and change the organic component into 60,000 tonnes of jet fuel, and 40 megawatts of power. By the end of 2015, it was hoped all British Airways flights from London City Airport would be fuelled by waste and rubbish discarded by London residents, leading to carbon savings equivalent to taking 150,000 cars off the road. The £340m scheme was mothballed in January 2016 following low crude oil prices, jittery investors and a lack of support from the UK government.

== See also ==
- Aviation biofuel
- Butanol fuel – Fuel for internal combustion engines
- Environmental impact of aviation
- Food vs. fuel
- Fossil fuel phase-out
- Indirect land use change impacts of biofuels
- Issues relating to biofuels
- Substitutional fuel
- Sustainable Oils
