= White liquor =

Solution used for paper pulping

White liquor is a strongly alkaline solution composed mainly of sodium hydroxide and sodium sulfide. It is used in the first stage of the Kraft process in which lignin and hemicellulose are separated from cellulose fiber for the production of pulp. The white liquor breaks the chemical bonds between lignin and cellulose substructures in wood materials and further degrades the lignin itself.

Sulfide is the active component in delignification. White liquor also contains minor amounts of sodium carbonate, sodium sulfate, sodium thiosulfate, sodium chloride, sodium bicarbonate, and calcium carbonate. Because the components of White Liquor are not consumed by the Kraft process they can be recovered from Black Liquor, the biproduct of pulp digestion. To do so, black liquor is converted to smelt, which is extracted with water to give green liquor. Addition of lime converts green liquor to white liquor, ready for reuse.

The chemical characteristics of the white liquor, deriving from its properties, are described by the parameters total alkali, active alkali, effective alkali, sulfidity, causticity, and reduction.

Parameter	Defining analytical value
Total alkali	All Na^{+} compounds
Active alkali (AA)	NaOH + Na_{2}S
Effective alkali (EA)	NaOH + ½ Na_{2}S
Sulfidity	Na_{2}S / (Na2S + NaOH)
Causticity	NaOH / (NaOH + Na_{2}CO_{3})
Reduction	Na_{2}S / (Na_{2}S + Na_{2}SO_{4})

== See also ==
- Paper chemicals
- 2026 Longview, Washington paper mill implosion
