= Shive (papermaking) =

A shive is a small bundle of incompletely cooked wood fibres in the chemical pulp used in papermaking. They are smaller than knots and are more difficult to separate from the pulp. Typically the content of shives in kraft pulp is 0.1 to 1.0%. An excess of shives is a sign of poor impregnation of the wood chips. Shives are separated from the pulp in the screening and can be added back after refining. Even though shives are darker than rest of the pulp, they may pass unnoticed to the paper machine because they are easily bleached. Shives in the paper machine can cause web breakage or other operational problems. They might also end as spots in the finished paper.

== See also ==
- Knot (papermaking)
- Kraft process
