= Carl F. Dahl =

German chemist who invented the kraft pulping process

- Born: 1849
- Died: 1902 (aged 52–53)
- Known for: Kraft process
- Scientific career
- Fields: Chemistry, papermaking

Carl Friedrich Dahl (1849–1902) was a German chemist who first developed the kraft (sulfate) pulping process, the dominant method of chemical pulping used in modern papermaking.

Dahl worked in Danzig (then part of Prussia, now Gdańsk, Poland), an important Baltic port with a developing paper and cellulose industry. In 1884, he received U.S. Patent No. 296,935 for a process that used sodium sulfate in place of soda ash in the chemical recovery cycle of a soda pulping system. The resulting cooking liquor contained sodium sulfide along with caustic soda, producing significantly stronger pulp fibers than the soda process alone.

In the following years, Dahl continued working in industrial chemistry and pulp technology throughout the 1880s and 1890s. He died in 1902, before witnessing the full global expansion of his invention, which would later dominate chemical pulp production worldwide.

== See also ==
- Chemical pulping
- Kraft process
- Papermaking

== Bibliography ==
- Kroschwitz, J. I. (1990). Encyclopedia of Chemical Technology. Wiley.
- Röhm, H. (1912). Die Sulfatzellstoff-Fabrikation (in German). Leipzig: Verlag von Otto Spamer.
