= Sulfate process =

Sulfate process may refer to:

- Kraft process, paper-making
- Sulfate process for titanium dioxide pigment
