= Knot (papermaking) =

Knots are unwanted, large, dark aggregates of wood fibres when making chemical pulp.

Knots are incompletely cooked wood chips coming out of the digester. Their origin is often dense parts of branches, such as compression wood or timber knots – hence the name. Knots can also stem from large/oversized wood chips due to insufficient impregnation with cooking liquors. The content of lignin is very high. In kraft pulping knots are typically 0.5–3.0 % of the digester throughput. The knots are screened from the pulp, because if left in the pulp they may damage washing equipment and consume large amounts of bleaching chemicals. They are normally sent back to the digester and re-cooked so that their fibres are not wasted.

== See also ==
- Shives
- Kraft process
