= 2026 Longview paper mill disaster =

Chemical disaster in Washington state, US

- Date: May 26, 2026
- Time: c. 7:15 am (Pacific Daylight Time)
- Venue: Nippon Dynawave Packaging facility
- Location: Longview, Washington, US; 46.1307°N 122.9843°W
- Type: Industrial accident
- Cause: Collapse of a 1,200,000-gallon white liquor tank
- Outcome: Contamination of the Columbia River
- Deaths: 11
- Injuries: 8 (7 facility workers, 1 firefighter)

Just before 7:15 am (PDT) on May 26, 2026, a 1,200,000-U.S.-gallon (4,500,000 L) chemical tank of white liquor collapsed at the Nippon Dynawave Packaging facility in Longview, Washington, United States. Eleven workers were killed. Seven more workers and one firefighter suffered burns and inhalation injuries.

The incident is Washington state's deadliest industrial disaster since 1930, when 17 workers died in an explosion in Carbonado at a mine owned by the Pacific Coast coal company.

== Background ==
The chemical tank that failed.

Weyerhaeuser began operations at the site in 1929 with a sawmill complex and later opened its first pulp mill at the site in 1931. In 1953 ground was broken on a new machine to produce paperboard for milk cartons and food containers, which was completed in 1955. In 2016, Nippon Paper purchased the pulp mill, paper machine and associated utilities from Weyerhaeuser while divesting itself of the joint venture NORPAC Mill also on the site. Weyerhaeuser continues to operate a sawmill and log export dock at the Longview site. Prior to this incident, the plant produced eight billion single-serve containers per year.

Before the collapse of a chemical tank in May 2026, the mill had experienced several other industrial incidents. A large wood chip pile at the mill caught fire in July 2023, causing unhealthy air quality levels in Portland; the exact cause was never determined. Another fire occurred in 2025 on the Nippon property with no injuries. Nippon had been cited for violating pollution and other environmental standards before the chemical tank collapse, including a $12,000 fine by the state Department of Ecology in the last two years. In 2025, the company was cited for moving equipment before an investigation into an employee's finger amputation could be completed. In March 2026, mill workers notified the state's Division of Occupational Safety and Health that a drain hole was creating a sinkhole in the floor.

== The incident ==
The white liquor process as at the NDP Longview paper mill, showing the point in the process where the incident occurred.

On the day of the incident, at around 1:55 am, the digestor unit (which uses wood chips and white liquor to produce pulp) experienced a process upset and was taken out of service until repairs could be completed. As a result, white liquor flow from the chemical tank was slowed down and later stopped completely. Although the flow out of the tank was stopped, white liquor flow from the recausticizers (equipment that re-generates waste into white liquor to be re-used in the process) continued at a reduced rate. This caused the chemical tank to continue to fill. By about 6:22 am, the tank was approximately 90% full. At around 7:09 am, the tank catastrophically failed, releasing approximately 900,000 gallons of white liquor.

Due to the chemical tank collapse, Industrial Way was shut down. During the response, the Washington National Guard and Washington State Guard provided decontamination support to search and recovery teams at the site.

The Washington State Department of Health worked with the local health department on a public health assessment, while the Washington State Department of Ecology continued water quality testing and coordinated with federal partners and the company on a plan to remove white liquor from the site. State ecology officials were sent to the site, and the US Chemical Safety and Hazard Investigation Board (CSB) opened an investigation.

KGW in Portland reported the contamination from the chemical tank collapse reached the Columbia River. Longview city officials and Washington governor Bob Ferguson said that dead carp had been recovered from dikes along the river. Citizens were advised to stay away from any dikes and ditches between Washington Way and Prudential Boulevard due to this contamination. There have been no effects on Longview's air quality and water supply. According to Chief Scott Goldstein of Cowlitz 2 Fire and Rescue, the river was contaminated from the blast.

=== Victims ===
Nine people died at the scene while two others succumbed to their injuries in hospital. All nine bodies were recovered from the scene by May 31. Seven workers at the facility suffered burns and inhalation injuries, along with one firefighter. All injured victims were transferred to hospitals around Southwest Washington and Portland, Oregon, approximately forty miles (65 km) south.

On May 27, five people were discharged from PeaceHealth and Legacy Health hospitals with injuries ranging from skin burns to eye and skin irritation.

Autopsy reports released by the Cowlitz County Coroner revealed that ten of the victims died from alkaline chemical burns, blunt force injuries, and asphyxia.

== Reactions ==
Governor Bob Ferguson visited Longview, along with Washington senator Patty Murray, Congresswoman Marie Gluesenkamp Perez and state representatives Jim Walsh and Jeff Wilson. Ferguson said in a statement: "I'm deeply saddened to hear that there have been fatalities. My thoughts are with the workers and their families, and with the first responders." The governor also said during a press conference in Longview, "We’re bracing ourselves for this being the deadliest industrial tragedy in modern Washington state history."

== Aftermath ==
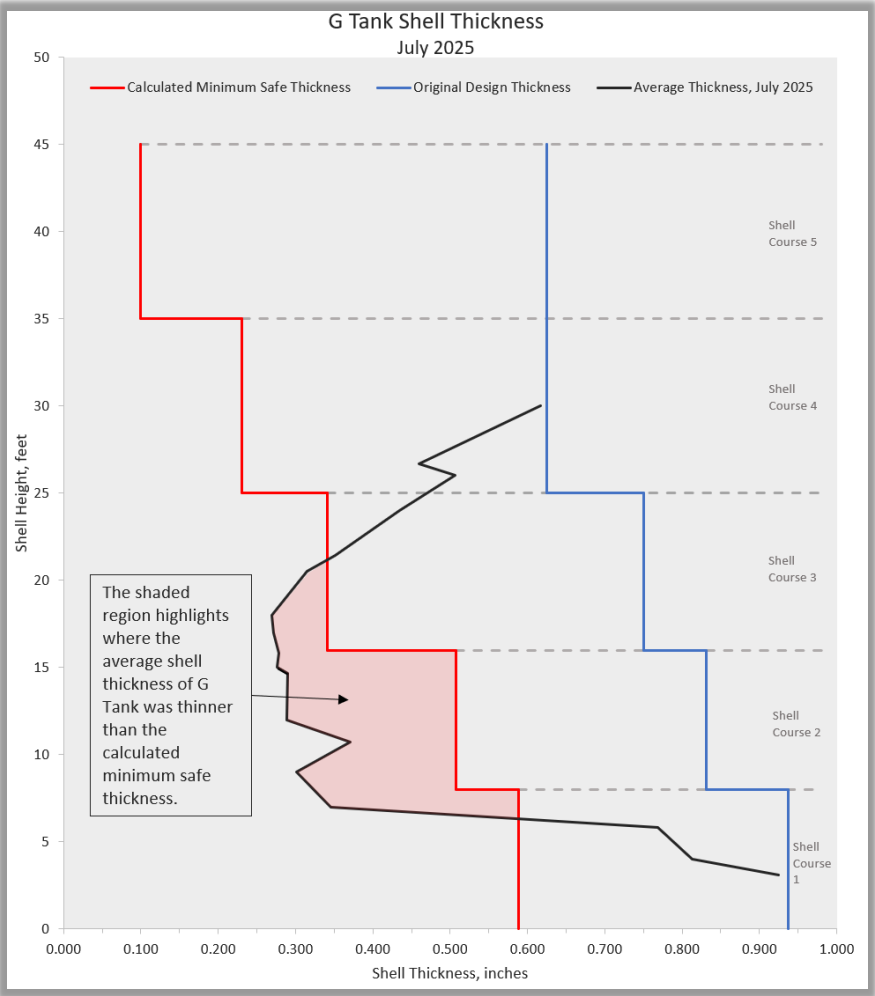
NDP G Tank shell thickness as measured in July 2025.

In a report on June 16, 2026, Nippon Paper said that critical equipment was not severely damaged, and that production at the site remained halted.

On July 1, 2026, the Washington State Attorney General's Office announced that it was given concurrent jurisdiction by the Cowlitz County Prosecutor to investigate potential criminal activity related to the incident.

On August 10, 2026, the mother of two of the victims filed a wrongful-death lawsuit against Nippon Dynawave Paper in Cowlitz County Superior Court.

The Washington State Department of Ecology released initial determinations of environmental violations related to the incident on August 26, 2026. The report detailed eighteen violations from the incident and response including issues with contingency planning.

The US Chemical Safety Board (CSB) provided an update on August 28, 2026, to the investigation it opened the day of the tank collapse. In the report the CSB stated that an inspection of the tank conducted by Nippon Paper ten months before the incident revealed that portions of its wall thickness were below recommended safe minimums. Nippon Dynawave responded that it will not comment on an ongoing investigation. The Association of Western Pulp and Paper Workers, the union representing hourly workers at the facility, called the report "deeply troubling". Washington Senator Patty Murray reacted to the report by stating that "this community deserves answers and accountability" and "every worker has the right to come home safely at the end of the day".

== See also ==
- 2026 in Washington (state)
