= Pulp mill =

Facility which pulps wood or plant fibre

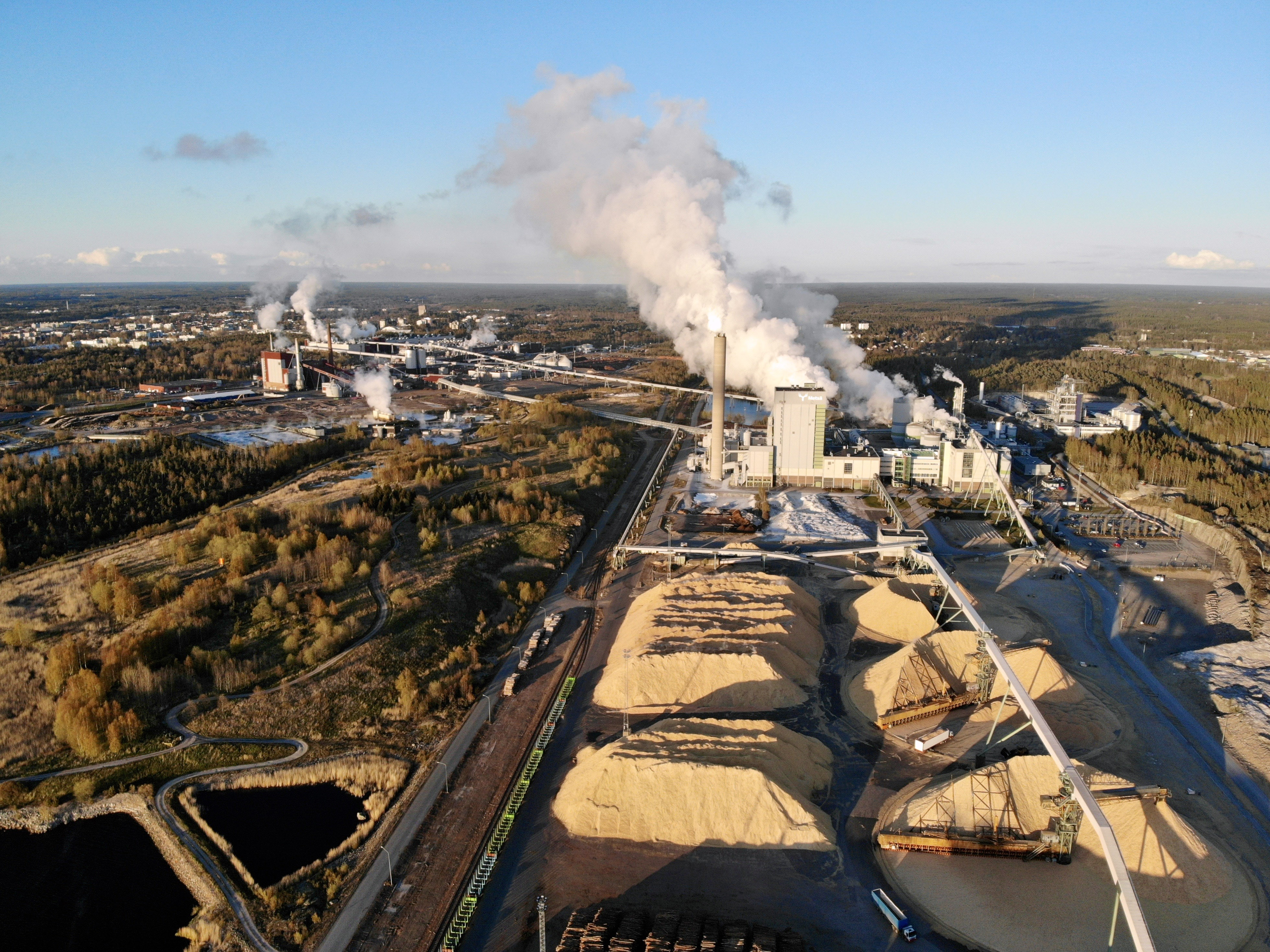
A pulp mill in Rauma, Finland

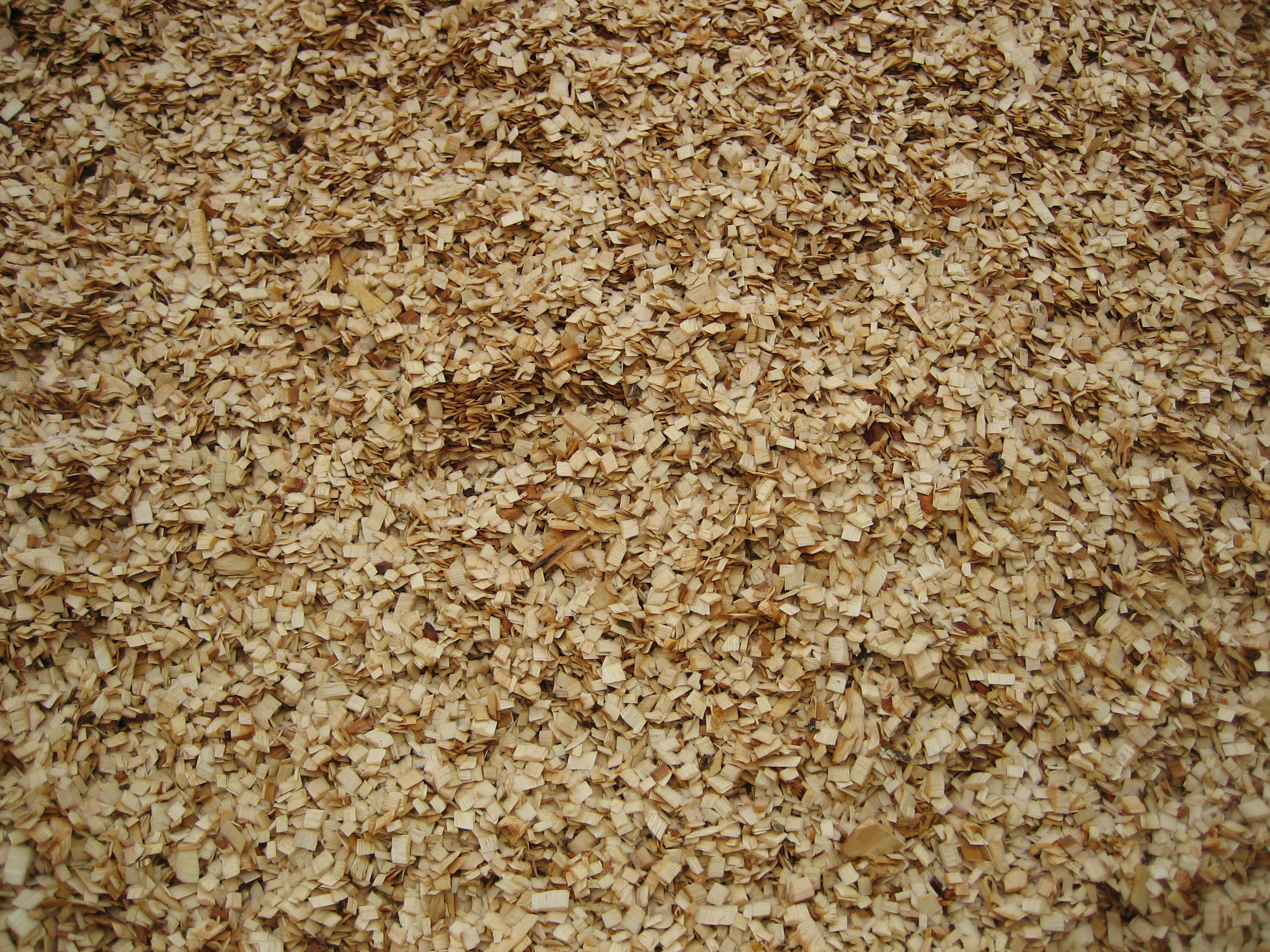
Woodchips for paper production

A pulp mill is a manufacturing facility that converts wood chips or other plant fiber sources into a thick fiber board which can be shipped to a paper mill for further processing. Pulp can be manufactured using mechanical, semi-chemical, or fully chemical methods. The aim of pulping is to break down the bulk structure of the fiber source, be it chips, stems or other plant parts, into the constituent fibers. Chemical pulping achieves this by degrading the lignin and hemicellulose into small, water-soluble molecules that can be washed away from the cellulose fibers without depolymerizing the cellulose fibers.

The earliest known methods for preparing pulp for paper making were water-powered, in 8th-century Samarkand, Abbasid Caliphate. Fibre source must be prepared before milling, which may occur in mechanical pulp mills, chemical pulp mills, or chemi-mechanical pulp mills.

== Description ==
A pulp mill is a manufacturing facility that converts wood chips or other plant fiber sources into a thick fiber board which can be shipped to a paper mill for further processing. Pulp can be manufactured using mechanical, semi-chemical, or fully chemical methods (kraft and sulfite processes). The finished product may be either bleached or non-bleached, depending on the customer requirements.

== Background ==
The aim of pulping is to break down the bulk structure of the fiber source, be it chips, stems or other plant parts, into the constituent fibers. Wood and other plant materials used to make pulp contain three main components (apart from water): cellulose fibres (desired for papermaking), lignin (a three-dimensional polymer that binds the cellulose fibres together) and hemicelluloses, (shorter branched carbohydrate polymers).

Chemical pulping achieves this by degrading the lignin and hemicellulose into small, water-soluble molecules that can be washed away from the cellulose fibers without depolymerizing the cellulose fibers (chemically depolymerizing the cellulose weakens the fibers). The various mechanical pulping methods, such as groundwood (GW) and refiner mechanical (RMP) pulping, physically tear the cellulose fibers one from another. Much of the lignin remains adhering to the fibers. Strength is impaired because the fibers may be cut. Related hybrid pulping methods use a combination of chemical and thermal treatment to begin an abbreviated chemical pulping process, followed immediately by a mechanical treatment to separate the fibers. These hybrid methods include thermomechanical pulping (TMP) and Chemi-thermomechanical pulping (CTMP). The chemical and thermal treatments reduce the amount of energy subsequently required by the mechanical treatment, and also reduce the amount of strength loss suffered by the fibers.

The most common fiber source for pulp mills is pulpwood. Other common sources are bagasse and fibre crops.

== History ==
The earliest known methods for preparing pulp for paper making were water-powered, in 8th-century Samarkand, Abbasid Caliphate.

== The mill ==
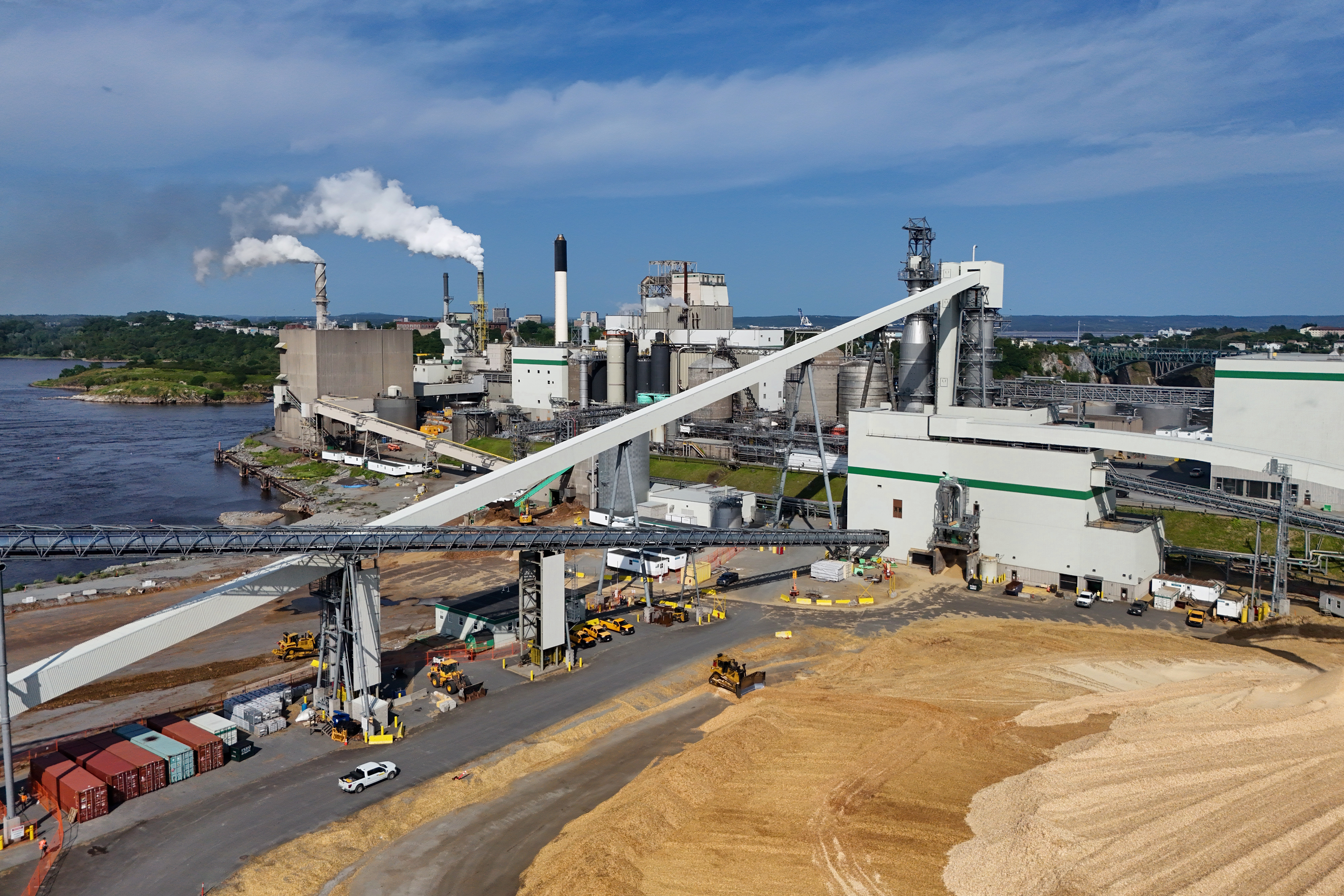
Irving pulp mill in Saint John, New Brunswick

Much of the information about the technology in following subsections is from the book by C.J. Biermann. The chemistry of the various pulping processes can be found in Sjöström's book.

=== Preparation of fibre source ===
The first step in all mills using wood (trees) as the fiber source is to remove the bark. Bark contains relatively few usable fibers and darkens the pulp. The removed bark is burned, along with other unusable plant material, to generate steam to run the mill. Almost all wood is then chipped before being processed further in order to free the fibers.

Removal of the bark is done in a barker (or debarker). The bark adhesion is about 3–5 kg/cm^{2} in the growing season (summer) and 2-3 times higher in the dormant season (winter). The bark of frozen logs is even more difficult to remove.

In chemical pulp mills, the bark introduces unwanted contaminants such as calcium, silica, and aluminum that cause scaling and give an extra loading for the chemical recovery system. Birchbark contains betulin, a terpenoid that easily creates deposits in a pulp mill.

=== Mechanical pulp mills ===
The earliest mills used sandstone grinding rollers to break up small wood logs called bolts, but the use of natural stone ended in the 1940s with the introduction of manufactured stones with embedded silicon carbide or aluminum oxide. The pulp made by this process is known as stone groundwood pulp (SGW). If the wood is ground in a pressurized, sealed grinder the pulp is classified as pressure groundwood (PGW) pulp. Most modern mills use chips rather than logs and ridged metal discs called refiner plates instead of grindstones. If the chips are just ground up with the plates, the pulp is called refiner mechanical pulp (RMP), if the chips are steamed while being refined the pulp is called thermomechanical pulp (TMP). Steam treatment significantly reduces the total energy needed to make the pulp and decreases the damage (cutting) to fibers. Mechanical pulp mills use large amounts of energy, mostly electricity to power motors which turn the grinders. A rough estimate of the electrical energy needed is 10,000 megajoules (MJ) per tonne of pulp (2,750 kWh per tonne)

=== Chemical pulp mills ===
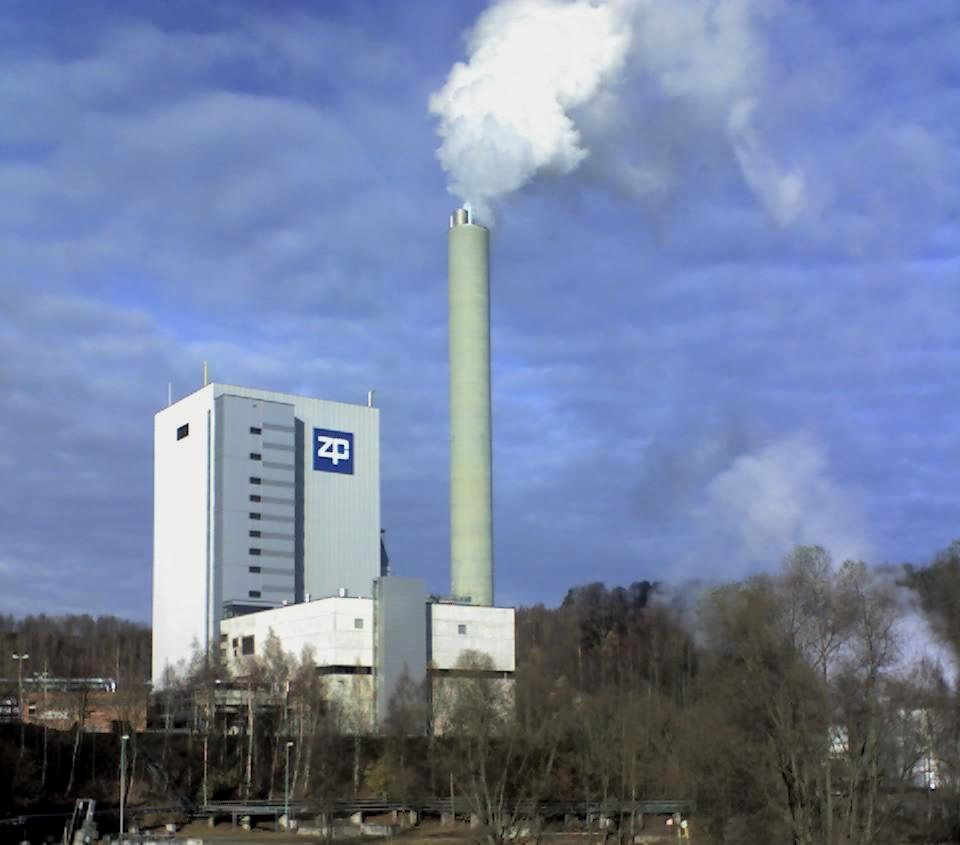
Pulp mill at Blankenstein (Germany)

Chemical pulping processes such as the kraft (or sulfate) process and the sulfite process remove much of the hemicelluloses and lignin. The kraft process does less damage to the cellulose fibers than the sulfite process, thereby producing stronger fibers, but the sulfite process makes pulp that is easier to bleach. The chemical pulping processes use a combination of high temperature and alkaline (kraft) or acidic (sulfite) chemicals to break the chemical bonds of the lignin. However, atmospheric pollution and contaminants in wastewater effluent in the kraft pulping process has been widely documented

The material fed into the digester must be small enough to allow the pulping liquor to penetrate the pieces completely. In the case of wood, the logs are chipped and the chips screened to ensure that the feed to the digester is of a uniform size. Oversized chips are either used as fuel or run through the chipper again, while sawdust may be burned or collected for sale. The screened chips or cut plant material (bamboo, kenaf, etc.) goes to the digester where it is mixed with an aqueous solution of the pulping chemicals, then heated with steam. In the kraft process the pulping chemicals are sodium hydroxide and sodium sulfide and the solution is known as white liquor. In the sulfite process the pulping chemical is a mixture of metal (sodium, magnesium, potassium, or calcium) and ammonium sulfite or sulfite.

After several hours in the digester, the chips or cut plant material breaks down into a thick porridge-like consistency and is "blown" or squeezed from the outlet of the digester through an airlock. The sudden change in pressure results in a rapid expansion of the fibers, separating the fibers even more. The resulting fiber suspension in water solution is called "brown stock".

Brown stock washers, using countercurrent flow, remove the spent cooking chemicals and degraded lignin and hemicellulose. The extracted liquid, known as black liquor in the kraft process, and red or brown liquor in the sulfite processes, is concentrated, burned and the sodium and sulfur compounds recycled in the recovery process. Lignosulphonates is a useful byproduct recovered from the spent liquor in the sulfite process. The clean pulp (stock) can be bleached in the bleach plant or left unbleached, depending on the end-use. The stock is sprayed onto the pulp machine wire, water drains off, more water is removed by pressing the sheet of fibers, and the sheet is then dried. At this point the sheets of pulp are several millimeters thick and have a coarse surface: it is not yet paper. The dried pulp is cut, stacked, bailed and shipped to another facility for whatever further process is needed.

Bleached kraft pulp and bleached sulfite pulp are used to make high quality, white printing paper. One of the most visible uses for unbleached kraft pulp is to make brown paper shopping bags and wrapping paper where strength is particularly important. A special grade of bleached sulfite pulp, known as dissolving pulp, is used to make cellulose derivatives such as methylcellulose which are used in a wide range of everyday products from laxatives to baked goods to wallpaper paste.

=== Chemi-mechanical pulp mills ===
Some mills pretreat wood chips or other plant material like straw with sodium carbonate, sodium hydroxide, sodium sulfite, and other chemical prior to refining with equipment similar to a mechanical mill. The conditions of the chemical treatment are much less vigorous (lower temperature, shorter time, less extreme pH) than in a chemical pulping process, since the goal is to make the fibers easier to refine, not to remove lignin as in a fully chemical process. Pulps made using these hybrid processes are known as Chemi-thermomechanical pulps (CTMP). Sometimes a CTMP mill is located on the same site as a kraft mill so that the effluent from the CTMP mill can be treated in the kraft recovery process to regenerate the inorganic pulping chemicals.

== Materials of construction ==
Stainless steels is used extensively in the pulp and paper industry for two primary reasons, to avoid iron contamination of the product and their corrosion resistance to the various chemicals used in the papermaking process.

A wide range of stainless steels are used throughout the pulp making process. For example, duplex stainless steels are being used in digesters to convert wood chips into wood pulp and 6% Mo super austenitic stainless steels are used in the bleach plant.

== Scheduling ==
The pulping process involves many production stages, usually coupled with intermediate storage tanks. As each stage has a different reliability and bottlenecks may vary from day to day, scheduling a pulp mill needs to take into account these bottlenecks and the probability of a disturbance or breakdown. Each stage also may have different decision variables, such as steam / water / chemical input, etc. Finally, scheduling needs to consider fuel optimization and CO_{2} emissions, because part of the energy requirements may be met from fossil-fuel boilers. The overall aim is to maximize production at minimum cost.

== See also ==
- Bleaching of wood pulp
- Kraft process
- Paper mill
- Uruguay River pulp mill dispute
- Sulfite process
- Wood pulp
