= Paper chemicals =

Chemicals used in paper manufacturing

Paper chemicals designate a group of chemicals that are used for paper manufacturing, or modify the properties of paper. These chemicals can be used to alter the paper in many ways, including changing its color and brightness, or by increasing its strength and resistance to water. The chemicals can be defined on basis of their usage in the process.

Chemical usage is not only for imparting properties to paper but to handle the water cycles in the process, conditioning of fabrics, cleaning of equipment and several other applications.

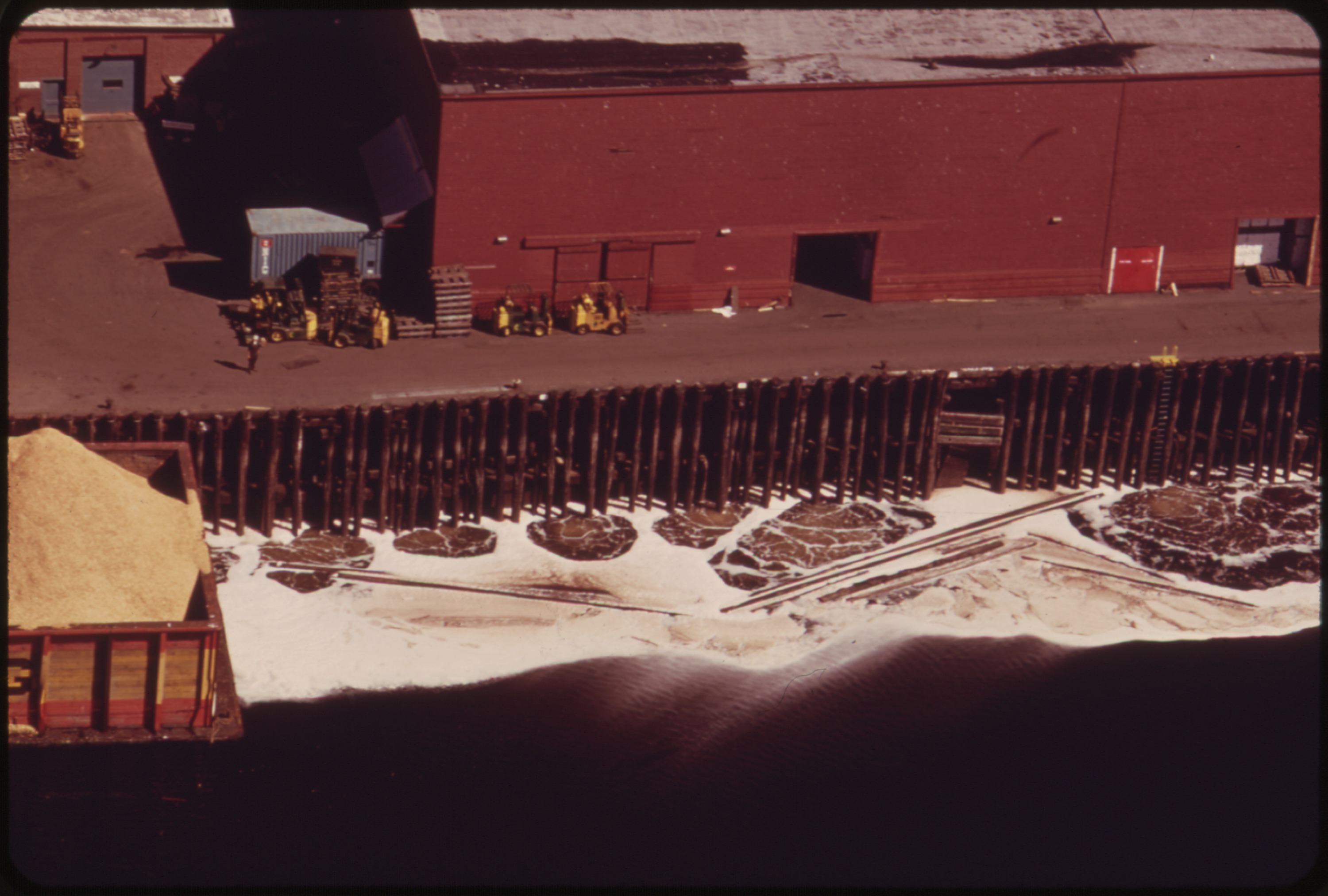
Sulfite pulp mill discharging wastewater in 2011

== Chemicals used in paper manufacturing ==
| Common name | Scientific name | Chemical formula | Notes |
|---|---|---|---|
| Alum | "Sulfate of alumina" | Al_{2}(SO_{4})_{3}·18H_{2}O | For alkaline sizing along with rosin |
| Albarine | "Calcium sulfate" | CaSO_{4}·2H_{2}O | Building materials |
| Caustic Soda (lye) | Sodium hydroxide | NaOH | Pulping |
| Chlorine dioxide | Chlorine dioxide | ClO_{2} | Pulp bleaching |
| Chlorine | Chlorine | Cl_{2} | Pulp bleaching |
| Dolomite | Calcium magnesium carbonate | CaMg(CO_{3})_{2} | Filler, Coating |
| DTPA | Diethylenetriaminepentaacetic acid | C_{14}H_{33}N_{3}O_{10} | Used for chelation (removal of transition metals from pulp). |
| EDTA | Ethylenediaminetetraacetic acid | C_{10}H_{16}N_{2}O_{8} | Used for chelation (removal of transition metals from pulp). |
| Enzyme | | | Used in deinking |
| FSA | Formamidine Sulfuric acid or Thiourea dioxide | CH_{4}N_{2}SO_{2} | Post deinking bleaching |
| Guar gum | Natural polymer; no systematic name | | Dry strength additive |
| Gypsum or mineral white or plaster | Calcium sulfate | CaSO_{4}·2H_{2}O | Gypsum board |
| Hydrogen peroxide | Hydrogen peroxide | H_{2}O_{2} | In pulp bleaching |
| Hypochlorous acid | Hypochlorous acid | HOCl | In pulp bleaching |
| Lime | Calcium oxide | CaO | Alkaline pulping process chemical recovery, bleaching |
| Limestone | Calcium carbonate | CaCO_{3} | To make precipitated CaCO_{3}, is used as filler and in coating |
| Magnesium bisulfite | Magnesium bisulfite | Mg(HSO_{3})_{2} | Used in sulfite pulping |
| Magnesite | Magnesium carbonate | MgCO_{3} - 100% | Filler for cigarette paper |
| Milk of Lime | Calcium hydroxide | Ca(OH)_{2} | For causticizing of green liquor |
| Milk of Magnesia | Magnesium hydroxide | Mg(OH)_{2} | |
| Oxygen | Oxygen | O_{2} | In pulp bleaching |
| Ozone | Ozone | O_{3} | In pulp bleaching |
| Rosin | Abietic acid | C_{19}H_{29}COOH | Sizing |
| Rosin Soap | Sodium abietate | C_{19}H_{29}COONa | Sizing |
| Salt Cake | Sodium sulfate | Na_{2}SO_{4}·10H_{2}O | Makeup chemical in sulfate pulping chemical recovery (Na_{2}SO_{4.} ---Na_{2}S) |
| Soap / fatty acid | | | Deinking |
| Sodium bisulfite | Sodium bisulfite | NaHSO_{3} | Used in sulfite pulping |
| Soda ash | Sodium carbonate | Na_{2}CO_{3} | Makeup chemical in alkaline pulping chemical recovery (Na_{2}CO_{3}+Ca(OH)_{2}---2NaOH+CaCO_{3}) |
| Sodium aluminate | Sodium aluminate | Na_{2}Al_{2}O_{4} | Used in conjunction with alum to control pH |
| Sodium bisulfite | Sodium bisulfite | NaHSO_{3} | An acid type cooking liquor chemical component sometimes used to neutralized residual chlorine in the pulp during the bleaching process. |
| Sodium chlorate | Sodium chlorate | NaClO_{3} | Used to generate Chlorine Dioxide |
| Sodium dithionite | Sodium hydrosulfite | Na_{2}S_{2}O_{4} | Bleaching |
| Sodium hypochlorite | Sodium hypochlorite | NaOCl | Bleaching |
| Sodium peroxide | Sodium peroxide | Na_{2}O_{2} | Bleaching |
| Sodium silicate | Sodium silicate | Na_{2}SiO_{3} | In waste paper deinking for wetting, peptization, ink dispersion, peroxide stabilization. |
| Sodium sulfide | Sodium sulfide | Na_{2}S | Active chemical in kraft/sulfate cooking liquor |
| Sodium thiosulfate | Sodium thiosulfate | Na_{2}S_{2}O_{3} | Bleaching |
| Sodium tripolyphosphate | Sodium tripolyphosphate | Na_{5}P_{3}O_{10} | Dispersant |
| Starch | | Wet and dry end additive | Consists of glucose units linked together by oxygen bridges called glycosides |
| Sulfur | Sulfur | S | To make HNO_{3} for bi-sulfite pulping |
| Surfactant | | | Used in deinking. Used as debonders in fluff pulp manufacture. |
| Titania | Titanium dioxide | TiO_{2} | Filler to increase the opacity and brightness of paper. Used in coating. |
| Anatase | Titanium dioxide | TiO_{2} | |

== Pulping ==
Chemical pulping involves dissolving lignin in order to extract the cellulose from the wood fiber. The different processes of chemical pulping include the Kraft process, which uses caustic soda and sodium sulfide and is the most common; alternatively, the use of sulfurous acid is known as the sulfite process, the neutral sulfite semichemical is treated as a third process separate from sulfite, and soda pulping which is the least ecologically hazardous utilizing sodium hydroxide or anthraquinone.

Caustic soda is added to increase the pH in the pulping process of fibers. The higher pH of the paper-fiber solution causes the fibers to smoothen and swell, which is important for the grinding process of the fibers.

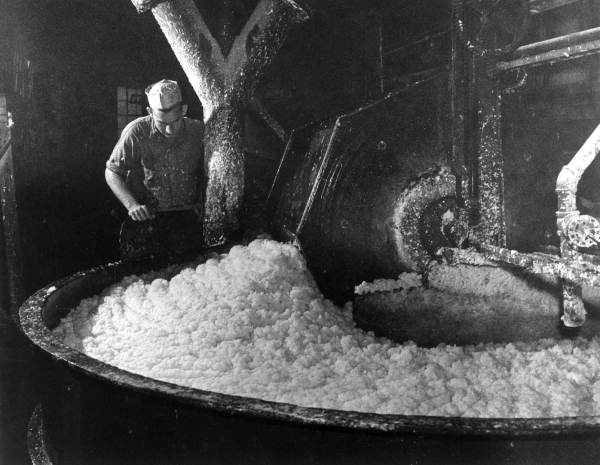
Processing pulp in a Hollander beater

== Bleaching ==
In the production of white paper, the wood pulp is bleached to remove any color from the trace amounts of lignin that was not extracted in the chemical pulping process. There are three predominant methods of bleaching:

- Elemental chlorine bleaching uses chlorine and hypochlorite.
- Elemental chlorine-free bleaching is more environmentally friendly since it eliminates the use of hypochlorite and replaces chlorine with chlorine dioxide or sodium chlorate.
- Totally chlorine-free bleaching utilizes oxygen and hydrogen peroxide. This is the most environmentally friendly process since it eliminates all chlorinated pollutants.

== Sizing ==
Most paper types must have some water-resistance to maintain a specific writing quality and printability. Until 1980, the typical manner of adding this resistance was by using a rosin in combination with alum. When the paper industry started using chalk instead of china clay as filler, the paper chemistry had to switch to a neutral process. At several places AKD (alkyl ketene dimer) and ASA (alkenyl succinic anhydride) are used. Latest development is to use surface size, which is applied using a size press. The advantage of surface sizing is that it does not interfere with the backend water chemistry.

== Strengthening ==
=== Wet-strength ===
Wet-strength additives ensure that paper retains its strength when it gets wet. This is especially important in tissue paper. Chemicals typically used for this purpose include epichlorohydrin, melamine, urea formaldehyde and polyimines. These substances polymerize in the paper and result in the construction of a strengthening network.

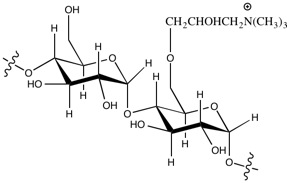
Cationic starch

To enhance the paper's strength, cationic starch is added to wet pulp in the manufacturing process. Starch has a similar chemical structure as the cellulose fibre of the pulp, and the surface of both the starch and fibre are negatively charged. By adding cationic (positive charged) starch, the fibre can bind with the starch and thus also increase the interconnections between the fibres. The positively charged portion of the starch is usually formed by quaternary ammonium cations. Quaternary salts that are used include 2.3-epoxy propyl trimethyl ammoniumchloride (EPTAC, also known as or Glytac Quab, GMAC™) and (3-chloro-2-hydroxypropyl) trimethyl ammonium chloride (CHPTAC, also known as Quat 188, Quab 188, Reagens™).

=== Dry-strength ===
Dry-strength additives, or dry-strengthening agents, are chemicals that improve paper strength normal conditions. These improve the paper's compression strength, bursting strength, tensile breaking strength, and delamination resistance. Typical chemicals used include cationic starch and polyacrylamide (PAM) derivatives. These substances work by binding fibers, often under the aid of aluminum ions in paper sheet.

== Binders ==
Binders promote the binding of pigment particles between themselves and the coating layer of the paper. Binders are spherical particles less than 1 μm in diameter. Common binders are styrene maleic anhydride copolymer or styrene-acrylate copolymer. The surface chemical composition is differentiated by the adsorption of acrylic acid or an anionic surfactant, both of which are used for stabilization of the dispersion in water. Co-binders, or thickeners, are generally water-soluble polymers that influence the paper's color viscosity, water retention, sizing, and gloss. Some common examples are carboxymethyl cellulose (CMC), cationic and anionic hydroxyethyl cellulose (EHEC), modified starch, and dextrin. Styrene butadiene latex, Styrene acrylic, dextrin, oxidized starch are used in coatings to bind the filler to the paper. Co-binders are natural products such as starch and CMC (Carboxymethyl cellulose), that are used along with the synthetic binders, like styrene acrylic or styrene butadiene. Co-binders are used to reduce the cost of the synthetic binder and improve the water retention and rheology of the coating.

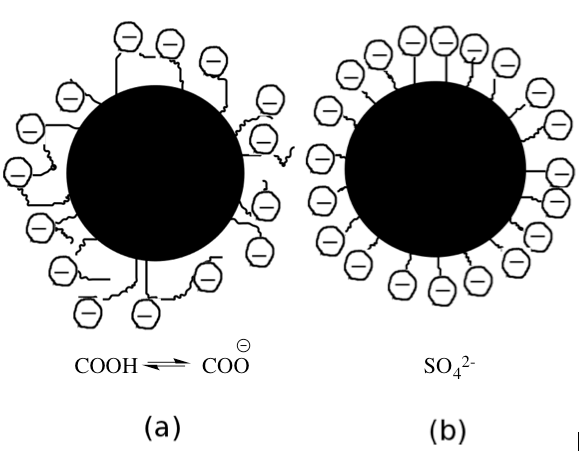
Binder spheres coated with acrylic acid (a) and anionic surfactant (b).

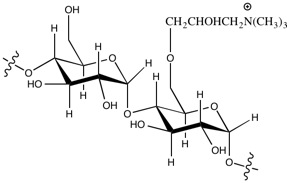
The molecular structure of cationic starch. The repeating unit of starch is derived from glucose interconnected with glycosidic bonds.

== Fillers ==
Mineral fillers are used to lower the consumption of more expensive binder material or to improve some properties of the paper. China clay, calcium carbonate, titanium dioxide, and talc are common mineral fillers used in paper production.

== Retention ==
A Retention agent is added to bind fillers to the paper. Fillers, such as calcium carbonate, usually have a weak surface charge. The retention agent is a polymer with high cationic, positively charged groups. An additional feature of a retention agent is to accelerate the dewatering in the wire section of the paper machine. Polyethyleneimine and polyacrylamide are examples of chemicals used in this process.

== Coating ==
=== Pigments ===
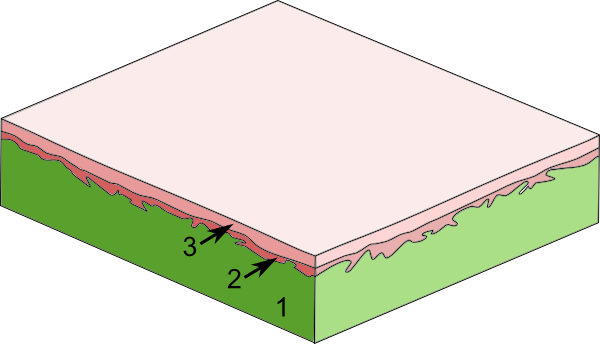
Paper Coating 1) The paper or board 2) The first layer of coating to even out the surface 3) A second layer for an even smoother and whiter surface

Pigments that absorb in the yellow and red part of the visible spectrum can be added. As the dye absorbs light, the brightness of the paper will decrease, unlike the effect of an optical-brightening agent. To increase whiteness, a combination of pigments and an optical-brightening agent are often used. The most commonly used pigments are blue and violet dyes.

=== Optical-brightening agent ===
Optical brightener is used to make paper appear whiter. Optical-brightening agents use fluorescence to absorb invisible radiation from the ultraviolet part of the light spectrum and re-emit the radiation as light in the visible blue range. The optical-brightening agent thus generates blue light that is added to the reflected light. The additional blue light offsets the yellowish tinge that would otherwise exist in the reflected light characteristics. It thus increases the brightness of the material (when the illumination includes ultraviolet radiation).

== See also ==
- Deinking recycled paper
- Surface chemistry of paper
- Organosolv (pulping technique)
- Per- and polyfluoroalkyl substances
