= Nippon Paper Industries =

Japanese paper company

Nippon Paper Industries Co., Ltd.

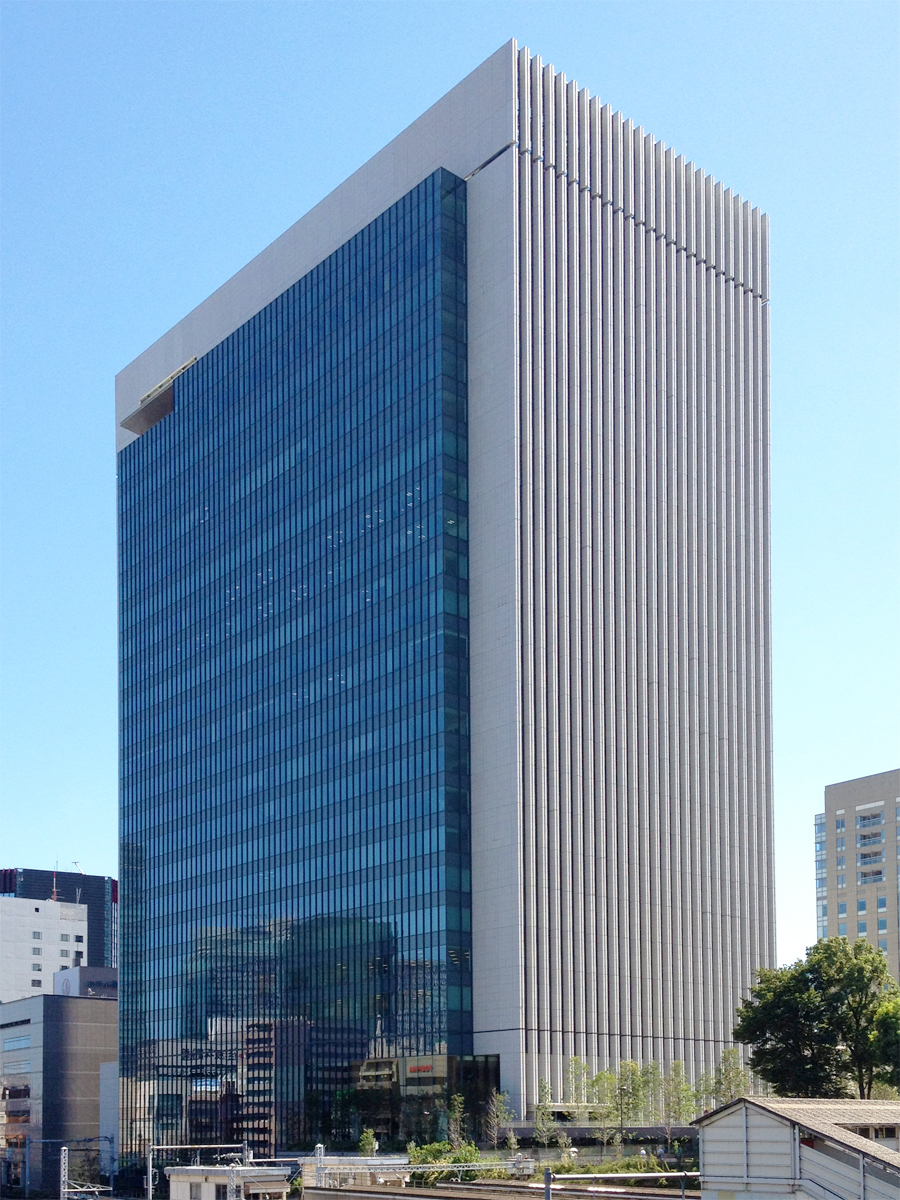
- Headquarters in Chiyoda, Tokyo
- Native name: 日本製紙株式会社
- Romanized name: Nihon Seishi Kabushiki-gaisha
- Formerly: Jujo Paper Co., Ltd. (1949-1993)
- Type: Public (K.K)
- Traded as: TYO: 3863
- Industry: Pulp and paper
- Founded: August 1, 1949; 76 years ago
- Headquarters: 4-6, Kanda-Surugadai, Chiyoda, Tokyo, Japan
- Area served: Worldwide
- Key people: Yoshio Haga, (CEO and President)
- Products: Paper; Paperboard; Household paper products; Specialty papers; Logs and lumber; Chemicals; Functional films
- Revenue: ▲$ 10.905 billion USD (FY 2012) (¥ 1,025 billion JPY) (FY 2012)
- Net income: ▲$ 113.319 million USD (FY 2012) (¥ 10.652 billion JPY) (FY 2012)
- Number of employees: 13,052 (consolidated ) (as of March 31, 2013)
- Website: Official website

Nippon Paper Industries Co., Ltd. (日本製紙株式会社, Nihon Seishi Kabushiki-gaisha) is a Japanese paper manufacturing company. The company's stock is listed on the Tokyo Stock Exchange.

As of April 2013, the company has 33 subsidiaries and 11 associate companies.

It is listed as one of the world's top 10 pulp and paper industry companies year-over-year and in 2012 it was sixth in the aforementioned list.

== History ==
- 1949 - Jujo Paper Co., Ltd. is founded
- 1968 - Jujo Paper merges with Tohoku Pulp Co., Ltd.
- 1972 - Sanyo Pulp (established in 1946) merged with Kokusaku Pulp (established in 1938) into Sanyo-Kokusaku Pulp Co., Ltd.
- 1993 - Upon merger of Jujo Paper Co., Ltd. and Sanyo-Kokusaku Pulp Co., Ltd., the company is renamed to Nippon Paper Industries
- 2001 - Nippon Unipac Holding is formed by the merger of Nippon Paper Industries Co., Ltd. and Daishowa Paper Manufacturing Co., Ltd. (established in 1938)
- 2003 - Both companies' paperboard divisions are merged to form Nippon Daishowa Paperboard
- 2004 - Nippon Unipac Holding is renamed to Nippon Paper Group, Inc.
- 2009 - Acquired Australian Paper for $700 million.
- 2013 - Nippon Paper Group, Inc. merged with Nippon Paper Industries and started operation as Nippon Paper Industries.
- 2016 - Nippon Paper has agreed to buy the world's third largest liquids packaging board business from U.S. timber company Weyerhaeuser.
- 2026 - Longview, Washington implosion: On May 26, a white liquor tank at Nippon Paper's Longview, Washington paper mill suffered an implosion and rupture with 11 fatalities and multiple injuries.
