= Steam exploded fiber =

Steam exploded fiber is a pulping and extraction technique that has been applied to wood and other fibrous organic material. The resulting fibers can be combined with organic polymers to produce fiber composite materials. Alternatively, the fibers, along with other extracted substances, can be processed chemically or digested to produce ethanol and other useful substances.
