= Soda pulping =

Chemical process for making wood pulp

Soda pulping is a chemical process for making wood pulp with sodium hydroxide as the cooking chemical. In the Soda-AQ process, anthraquinone (AQ) may be used as a pulping additive to decrease the carbohydrate degradation. The soda process gives pulp with lower tear strength than other chemical pulping processes (sulfite process and kraft process), but has still limited use for easily pulped materials like straw and some hardwoods.

== History ==
A precursor to the soda pulping process was the paper making process developed by Matthias Koops in 1801 which involved washing wood shavings in limewater, adding soda crystals and then boiling the mixture. Soda pulping was one of the first chemical pulping methods and was invented in 1851 by Burgess (United States) and Watts (England). In France in 1852 Coupier and Mellier patented a soda process based on an 1851 invention the patent of which preceded that of Watt and Burgess, which was filed in 1854. The first mill was started in 1866 in the USA. In 1865 they patented a method for recovery of the cooking liquors by incineration of the spent liquor. Many of the early soda mills converted to kraft mills once it was discovered.

== Production ==
Around 5%-10% of paper production worldwide is produced from agricultural crops, valuing agricultural paper production at between $5 billion and $10 billion. The most notable of these agricultural crops are wheat straw and bagasse. Using agricultural crops rather than wood has the added advantage of reducing deforestation.

Due to the ease with which bagasse can be chemically pulped, bagasse requires less bleaching chemicals than wood pulp to achieve a bright, white sheet of paper.

Most chemical bagasse pulp mills concentrate the spent reaction chemicals and combust them to power the paper-mills and to recover the reaction chemicals.

=== As solution for silicate scaling ===
Many grasses, bagasse, bamboo and some tropical hardwoods contain much silicates that may cause sodium aluminum silicate scales. Moderate amounts of silicates can be controlled with purging lime mud or lime kiln ash. Silicate removal from green liquor in a soda mill can be achieved by lowering the pH of the liquor with CO_{2}-containing flue gases from the lime kiln or other sources. No commercial silicate removal system is available for the kraft process, but it can handle the small amounts of silicates from northern woods.

== See also ==
- Paper chemicals
