= Organosolv =

Technique in industrial paper-making

In industrial paper-making processes, organosolv is a pulping technique that uses an organic solvent to solubilise lignin and hemicellulose. It has been considered in the context of both pulp and paper manufacture and biorefining for subsequent conversion of cellulose to fuel ethanol. The process was invented by Theodor Kleinert in 1968 as an environmentally benign alternative to kraft pulping.

Organosolv has several advantages when compared to other popular methods such as kraft or sulfite pulping. In particular, the ability to obtain relatively high quality lignin adds value to a process stream otherwise considered as waste. Organosolv solvents are easily recovered by distillation, leading to less water pollution and elimination of the odour usually associated with kraft pulping.

== Solvents ==
Organosolv pulping involves contacting a lignocellulosic feedstock such as chipped wood with an aqueous organic solvent at temperatures ranging from 140 to 220 °C. This causes lignin to break down by hydrolytic cleavage of alpha aryl-ether links into fragments that are soluble in the solvent system. Solvents used include acetone, methanol, ethanol, butanol, ethylene glycol, formic acid, and acetic acid. The concentration of solvent in water ranges from 40 to 80%. Higher boiling solvents have the advantage of a lower process pressure. This is weighed against the more difficult solvent recovery by distillation. Ethanol has been suggested as the preferred solvent due to cost and easy recovery. Although butanol is shown to remove more lignin than other solvents and solvent recovery is simplified due to immiscibility in water, its high cost limits its use.

== For pulp production ==
Numerous authors report that pulping with ethanol-water solutions gives a lignin free pulp yield 4–4.5% higher than that of kraft pulp. The commonly used solvents acetone and ethanol have been examined with respect to pulp properties. The pulping of wheat straw with 40% mixtures of acetone or ethanol with water requires 60 minutes at 180 °C to give good pulp properties. Organic solvents are almost always used as a mixture with water for process considerations such as reducing the vapour pressure and lowering the pH in order to also solubilise hemicellulose.

Only some small organosolv pulp mills are run today for production of pulp from annual renewable non wood fibre sources like straw, bagasse, etc.

== For fuel ethanol production ==
Recently, due to the popularity of second generation biofuels, the organosolv process has been considered in the context of bioethanol production. Cellulose from the organosolv process is susceptible to enzymatic hydrolysis into glucose followed by fermentation to dilute ethanol. The organosolv fractionation of mountain-beetle-killed lodgepole pine has yielded 97% conversion to glucose. Pan et al. recovered 79% of the lignin using conditions of 170 °C, 1.1% w/w H_{2}SO_{4}, 65% v/v ethanol for 60 minutes. Furthermore, ethanol organosolv pretreated rice straw was used to produce biohydrogen using Enterobacter aerogenes. The effect of temperature (120–180 °C), residence time (30–90 min), and ethanol concentration (45–75% v/v) on the hydrogen yield, residual biomass, and lignin recovery was investigated using RSM. The glucose concentration at the optimum conditions was 4.22-fold of untreated straw.

== Lignin recovery ==
The recovery of lignin from ethylene glycol organosolv pulping can be effected by 3 times dilution with acidified water. The lignin precipitates and forms spherical aggregates ranging from 0.5 to 2.5 μm. Filtration, while time-consuming, is then most effective while the mixture is hot (>100 °C). Recovery can be achieved by filtration or centrifugation. Due to the hydrophobic nature of organosolv lignin, flotation of organosolv lignin is effective without the use of the collecting and precipitating agents that are required for flotation of kraft lignin.

== Processes ==
=== Organocell ===
Organocell uses two-stage organosolv with roughly 50% methanol solutions. Sodium hydroxide is added in the second stage at a loading of 30% w/w of the dry wood. The lignin from the second stage is isolated by adding phosphoric acid until a pH of 4.0 is reached.

=== Alcell ===
The Alcohol Pulping and Recovery (APR) process treats wood in 3 stages, each using increasingly cleaner solvent. The important process parameters are extraction time, temperature, solvent composition and pH. Pilot plant operation has shown that ethanol pulping produces pulp superior to sulphite pulp at a lower cost. Lignin and hemicellulose are recovered in high yields. In 1987 the APR process was renamed the Alcell process. The process uses aqueous ethanol solutions (40–60% v/v) to delignifying wood at temperatures from 180 to 210 °C and 2–3.5 MPa. Solvent is recovered with flash evaporation, vapour condensation and vacuum stripping.

A demonstration organosolv pulp mill operated in Miramichi, New Brunswick, Canada from 1989 to 1996 using the Alcell process. Repap owned the IP to the process when taken over by hedge funds in 1997. The pilot plant boasted superior environmental performance, excellent bleached pulp, an economically attractive scale of 300 tons/day and commercially attractive by-products. It is said that the technology can be used to exploit small regions of hardwood resource that could not support a modern sized kraft mill.

=== CIMV process ===
Compagnie Industrielle de la Materière Végétale in France have developed a process where wheat straw is treated with acetic acid / formic acid / water (30/55/15 v/v/v) for 3.5 h at 105 °C under atmospheric pressure. The obtained fibres are screened and bleached. At this conditions the lignin is dissolved and hemicelluloses are hydrolysed to oligo and monosaccharides. Organic acids are collected by concentration of the cooking liquor and then lignin is precipitated by adding water and high pressure filtration.

=== Chempolis process ===
Chempolis Ltd in Oulu, Finland has developed, since 1995, a process concept where any lignocellulosic fibrous biomass sources are delignified with formic acid (biosolvent) in a compact process. The so-called "formico" technology incorporates full biosolvent recovery by evaporation and distillation in order to have a closed-loop process with minimal water need and effluent discharge. The delignification selectively fractionates lignocellulose components into cellulosic fibre, hemicellulose and lignin. Part of the hemicelluloses react to furfural and acetic acid, which are recovered in the distillation process to high-grade commercial products. The clean cellulosic fibre is used in various high-end packaging and textile purposes (bleached easily with hydrogen peroxide), or hydrolysed into high-purity glucose readily converted into biochemicals, or the glucose is easily fermented to bioethanol. The dissolved hemicelluloses and lignin after delignification are concentrated in evaporation and separated to produce hemicellulose fraction suitable for fermentation into ethanol or conversion to biochemicals. The separated lignin is sulfur-free and used in high-end applications replacing fossil aromatics.

=== American Science and Technology (AST) process ===
American Science and Technology (AST) based out of Chicago, Illinois, USA, has developed a process which uses a patented second generation Organosolv process to convert any kind of biomass to more than 10 industrial fine chemicals, organic intermediates and solvents. With a 2 ton/day production facility located in Wausau, Wisconsin, AST can also make high quality pulp, glucose, fructose and lignin. With the AST process, lignocellulosic biomass is treated with sulfuric acid, water, butanol and other organic solvents, water, an organic or inorganic acid, and catalyst for one to three hours at 150 to 200 °C. The results produce fibers that are screened and bleached for paper products. At these conditions, the lignin is dissolved in organic solvent and hemicelluloses are used to produce more organic solvent. Organic solvents are collected by separating water from the cooking liquor and then the lignin is precipitated by adding water, heat, and filtration.

=== Aldehyde assisted fractionation (AAF) process ===
The Bloom process was developed at EPFL in Lausanne and is commercialised by Bloom Biorenewables Sàrl. This method is based on a protection chemistry that prevents lignin and C5 sugars condensation.
