= H-factor =

H-factor is a kinetic model for the rate of delignification in kraft pulping. It is a single variable model combining temperature (T) and time (t) and assuming that the delignification is one single reaction.

$$H = \int_0^t \exp\left(43.2-16115/T\right)\,dt\,$$
