= Green liquor =

Green liquor is the dissolved smelt of sodium carbonate, sodium sulfide and other compounds from the recovery boiler in the kraft process. Within the recovery boiler, the sodium sulfate is reduced to sodium sulfide, the reagent most responsible for delignification. The liquor's eponymous green colour arises from the presence of colloidal iron sulfide.

The green liquor is usually treated with lime (Ca(OH)) in the causticizing stage to regenerate white liquor:

Na_{2}CO_{3} + Ca(OH) → 2 NaOH + CaCO_{3}

Alternatively, green liquor can be used prior to white liquor to extract some hemicellulose.
