= Kraft process =

Process of converting wood into wood pulp

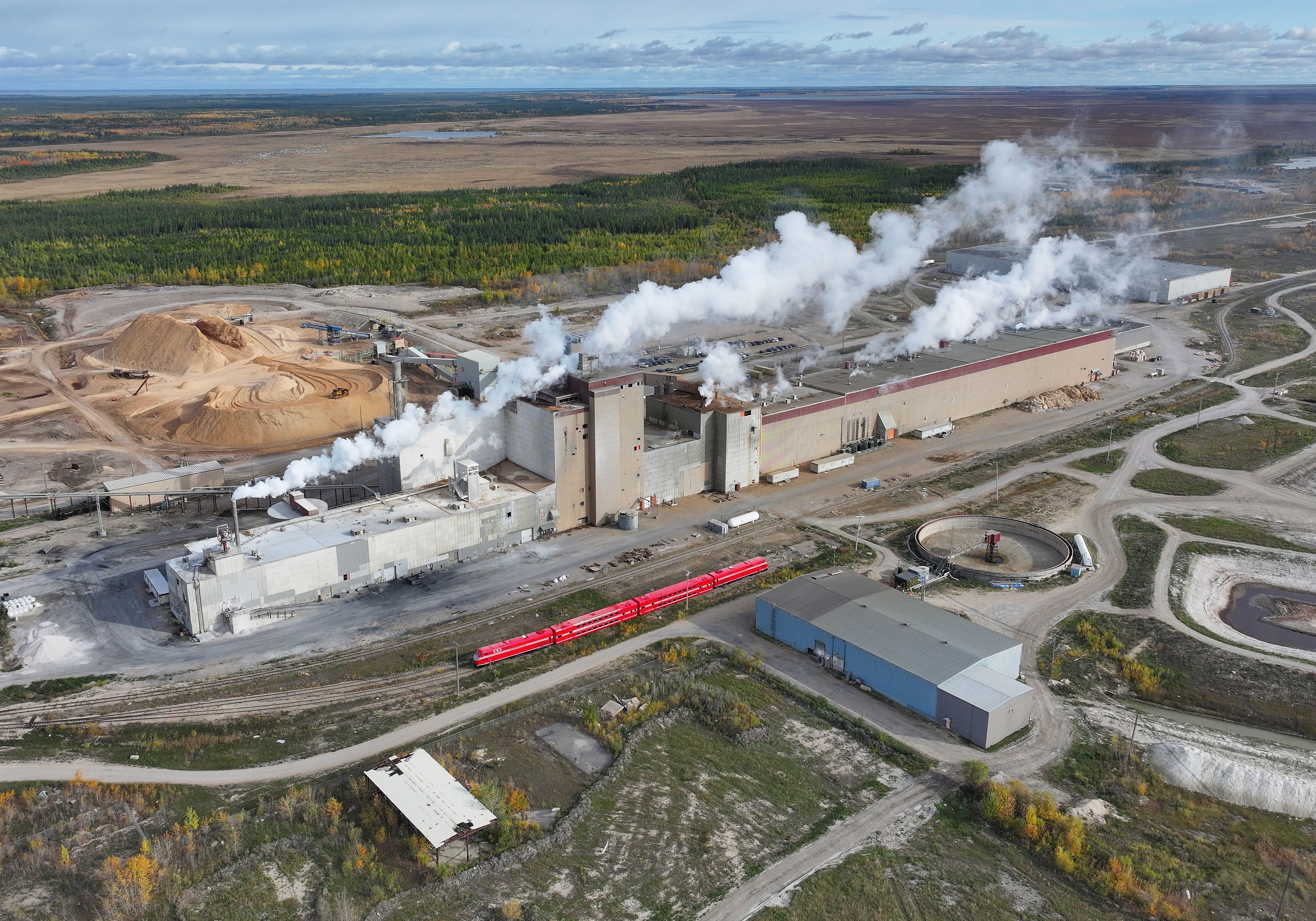
A kraft paper mill in The Pas, Manitoba

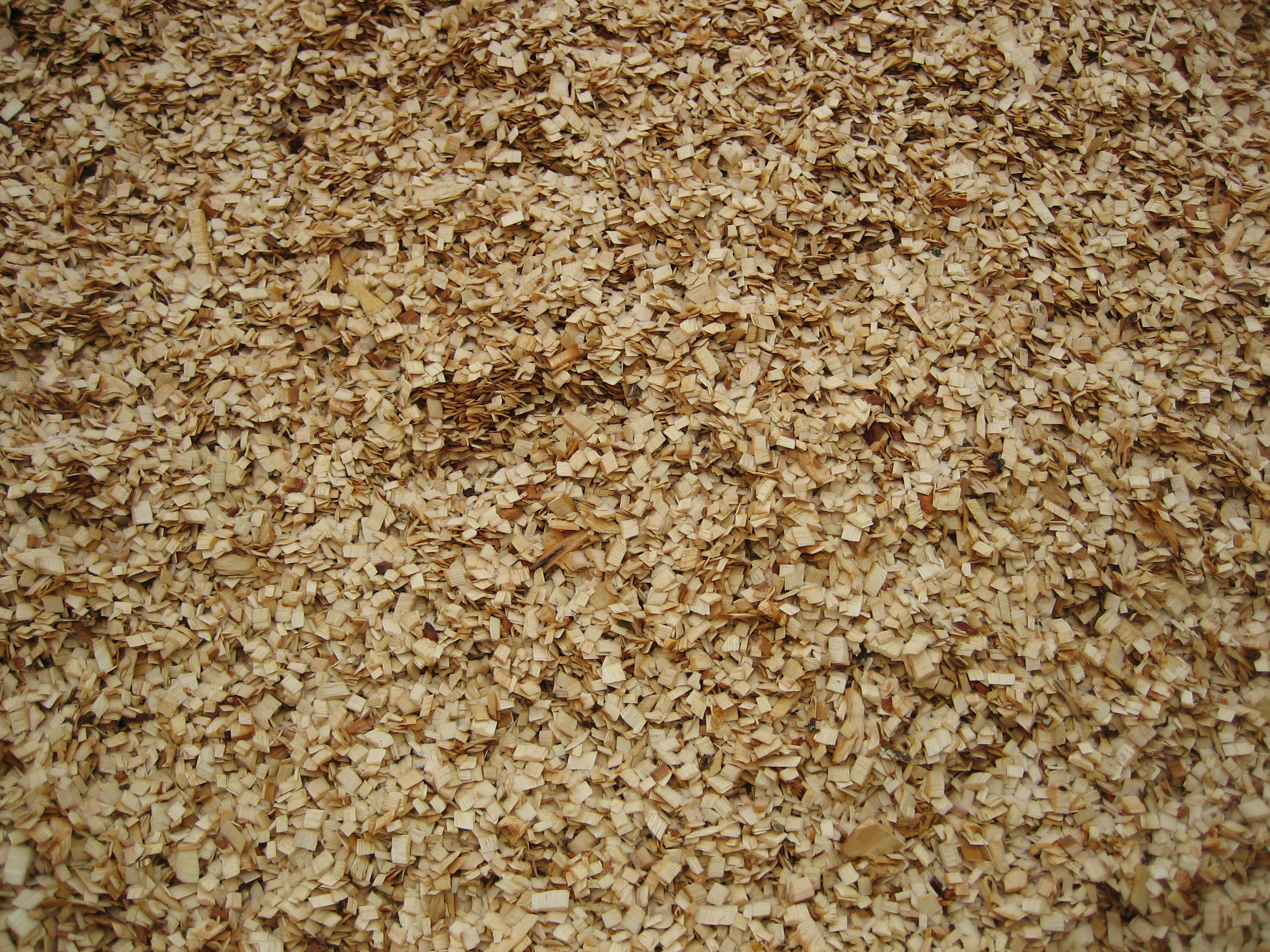
Woodchips for paper production

The kraft pulping process, or simply kraft or sulfate process (spelling, sulphate in the U.K. and older literature), is a dominant industrial process for conversion of wood into wood pulp, a product that consists of almost pure cellulose fibres, the main component of paper. The process name is derived from the Swedish word kraft, meaning "strength" in this context, due to the characteristic strength of the kraft paper produced using the process.

The kraft process involves treatment of wood chips with a heated "white liquor"—an aqueous solution of sodium hydroxide and sodium sulfide —that dissolves and degrades lignin and hemicellulose, with the goal of producing cellulose. The process entails several steps, both chemical and mechanical, and it is the predominant process globally and within the U.S. for producing the wood pulp used in the manufacture of paper. In some locales, manufacturing using the process has been controversial because kraft plants release odorous volatiles and produce and store substantial liquid chemical intermediates and waste.

== Process overview ==
The kraft pulping process is a wood pulp-producing process used in paper manufacture that is amenable to all wood species, and that produces high strength brown pulps (unless bleached). The process is highly alkaline (pH 13-14), a consequence of use of a combination of sodium hydroxide (NaOH) and sodium sulfide (Na_{2}S), in a general proportion of 15-25% by weight "on wood" (see following). The process is performed in an unlined industrial reaction vessel, the digester, and is associated with a "high recovery of pulping chemicals", but also with sulfurous odors. The process is used, unbleached, to produce paper for bags, wrapping, and linerboard, and bleached for various types of white paper products. Process yields are more modest than for mechanical and chemi-mechanical pulping methods, but achieve on the order of 65-70% for unbleached paper (closer to 50% when the pulp is destined for bleaching), and after bleaching, overall yields may be on the order of 45% or less.

== History ==
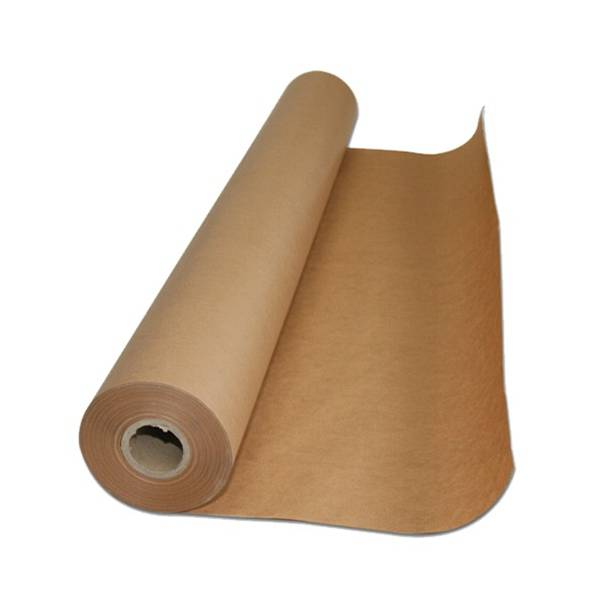
A roll of kraft paper

The pulp and paper industry is old and multifaceted. The naming of this process dates to the first production of "kraft paper", in Jõnkoping, Sweden, at the Munksjõ mill, and their manufacturing pulp according to a process patented by C. F. Dahl, of Danzig, in 1885. (Sometimes dated to 1890 rather than 1885, the Swedish location of the manufacturing has been attributed to the German paper industry not accepting the new process.)

Dahl had been experimenting with the substitution of sodium sulfate ("sulphate"), supplied from "salt cake", for sodium carbonate (supplied from soda ash), as a replacement for "alkali lost in cooking" to produce straw pulp, the sulfate being reduced to the corresponding sulfide ("sulphide"), "in the recovery furnace." He had begun to experiment with this substitution process in 1879, following U.S. Patents from others, from 1870-1871 (see following), at first with unsatisfactory results, but with eventual greater success and extension of the process to include coniferous woods. The successful mill production was reported to be the result of an insightful response of the Munksjõ mill manager to operator error—a sulfate digester run having been terminated ("blown") prematurely—to which he responded by processing rather than discarding the chips perceived incompletely digested, to discover that the resulting pulp gave a paper "dark in color [that] was far stronger than any paper hitherto known". Its strength led to the Swedish word for that characteristic, kraft, being applied to the process (and so the sulfate/sulfide addition to the earlier alkali process became known as the kraft or sulfate/sulphate process).

The generated mixture of sodiums hydroxide and sulfide to pulp the wood, with the sulfide "accelerat[ing] the delignification", led to shortened chip exposures to hot alkali (relative to the earlier soda process), with the greater observed strength of kraft pulp over soda pulp (and less carbohydrate degradation) being attributed to this reduced alkali exposure. The crediting of Dahl as discoverer is complicated by the existence of two earlier patents on sulfide use in pulping wood from A. K. Eaton, in August 1870 and September 1871, more than a decade before Dahl's patent. Moreover, there is discussion in the primary and secondary manufacturing literatures in England, in the 1940s-1960s, suggesting that the addition of "sulphur and sulphides" to procedures for the pulping of straw using alkali dated to "experiments in England during the Napoleonic Wars (i.e., 1805-1814)". Even so, Dahl is, in particular, credited with establishing the recovery process for the chemicals used in the kraft process, which is considered by at least one scholar as "perhaps more important than the kraft cooking process" itself.

The expanding use of the process in the United States, especially in southern states where the pulping of chips from "resinous pine species" was not well suited to the earlier sulfite process (in particular, using a calcium base), was marked in the period from 1915-1930. The invention of the recovery boiler by G. H. Tomlinson in the early 1930s, was a further milestone in the development and expanded use of the kraft process. It enabled the recovery and reuse of the inorganic pulping chemicals such that a kraft mill is a nearly closed-cycle process with respect to inorganic chemicals, apart from those used in the bleaching process. For this reason, by 1993, the kraft process was being described as "the dominant process" for producing wood pulp. (The kraft process superseded the sulfite process as the dominant process in the 1940s.)

== Process ==
=== Cooking ===
Wood chips are "cooked" in pressurized digesters with the white liquor. Some digesters operate in a batch manner and some in a continuous process. In some cases, the plant feedstock is pretreated with acids.

As of the work of McLeod in 1992, reported by the EPA in 1993, the mean capacity of "extended cooking installations", globally, was >1,100 tons per day, with the largest facility tabulated, the 1992-launched Union Camp in Savannah, Georgia, itself producing 2,450 tons per day. Typically, the conditions for the stage of delignification involving this caustic white liquor treatment taking place in the large pressure vessel termed the digester include heating to 170°C, for a period of time dependent upon "the degree of delignification desired" (perhaps on the order of two hours). One of the main chemical reactions that underpins the kraft process is the scission of ether bonds by the nucleophilic sulfide (S^{2−}) or bisulfide (HS^{−}) ions.

At 170 to 176 °C (338 to 349 °F), under these white liquor "cooking" conditions, lignin and hemicellulose degrade to give fragments that are soluble in the strongly alkaline liquid. The solid pulp—about 50% by weight of the dry wood chips—is collected and washed. The pulp is known as "brown stock" at this point, and the combined liquids as "black liquor", both because of their colors. The mixture contains lignin fragments, carbohydrates from the breakdown of hemicellulose, sodium carbonate, sodium sulfate, and other inorganic salts.

=== Recovery process ===
The recovery process achieves two dominant goals: (i) removal of the organic side products (soaps) from the black liquor and (ii) regeneration of sodium sulfide, the reagent that does the digestion of the plant feedstock. The excess black liquor contains about 15% solids and is concentrated in a multiple effect evaporator. After the first step the black liquor has about 20–30% solids. At this concentration the rosin soap rises to the surface and is skimmed off. The collected soap is further processed to tall oil. Removal of the soap improves the evaporation operation of the later effects.

The weak black liquor is further evaporated to 65% or even 80% solids ("heavy black liquor") and burned in the recovery boiler to recover the inorganic chemicals for reuse in the pulping process. Higher solids in the concentrated black liquor increases the energy and chemical efficiency of the recovery cycle, but also gives higher viscosity and precipitation of solids (plugging and fouling of equipment). During combustion, sodium sulfate is reduced to sodium sulfide by the organic carbon in the mixture:

1. Na_{2}SO_{4} + 2 C → Na_{2}S + 2 CO_{2}

This reaction is similar to thermochemical sulfate reduction in geochemistry.

The molten salts ("smelt") from the recovery boiler are dissolved in a process water known as "weak wash". This process water, also known as "weak white liquor", is composed of all liquors used to wash lime mud and green liquor precipitates. The resulting solution of sodium carbonate and sodium sulfide is known as "green liquor", owing its eponymous green colour to the presence of colloidal iron sulfide. This liquid is then mixed with calcium oxide, which becomes calcium hydroxide in solution, to regenerate the white liquor used in the pulping process through an equilibrium reaction; Na_{2}S is shown, since it is part of the green liquor (but does not participate in the reaction):

2. Na_{2}CO_{3} + Ca(OH)_{2} ←→ 2 NaOH + CaCO_{3}

Calcium carbonate precipitates from the white liquor and is recovered and heated in a lime kiln where it is converted to calcium oxide (lime).

3. CaCO_{3} → CaO + CO_{2}

Calcium oxide (lime) is reacted with water to regenerate the calcium hydroxide used in Reaction 2:

4. CaO + H_{2}O → Ca(OH)_{2}

The combination of reactions 1 through 4 form a closed cycle with respect to sodium, sulfur and calcium and is the main concept of the so-called recausticizing process where sodium carbonate is reacted to regenerate sodium hydroxide.

The recovery boiler also generates high pressure steam which is fed to turbogenerators, reducing the steam pressure for the mill use and generating electricity.

A modern kraft pulp mill is more than self-sufficient in its electrical generation and normally will provide a net flow of energy which can be used by an associated paper mill or sold to neighboring industries or communities through to the local electrical grid. Additionally, bark and wood residues are often burned in a separate power boiler to generate steam.

Although recovery boilers using G.H. Tomlinson's invention have been in general use since the early 1930s, attempts have been made to find a more efficient process for the recovery of cooking chemicals. Weyerhaeuser has operated a Chemrec first generation black liquor entrained flow gasifier successfully at its New Bern plant in North Carolina, while a second generation plant is run in pilot scale at Smurfit Kappa's plant in Piteå, Sweden.

An additional technology is employed to lower the use of lime. In "partial borate autocausticizing" (PBAC), boric acid is added which produces sodium borate in place of sodium carbonate.

=== Blowing ===
The finished cooked wood chips are blown to a collection tank called a blow tank that operates at atmospheric pressure. This releases a lot of steam and volatiles. The volatiles are condensed and collected; in the case of northern softwoods this consists mainly of raw turpentine.

=== Screening ===
Screening of the pulp after pulping is a process whereby the pulp (called accept) is separated from large shives, knots, dirt and other debris (called reject).

The screening section consists of different types of sieves (screens) and centrifugal cleaning. The sieves are normally set up in a multistage cascade operation because considerable amounts of good fibres can go to the reject stream when trying to achieve maximum purity in the accept flow.

The fiber containing shives and knots are separated from the rest of the reject and reprocessed either in a refiner or is sent back to the digester. The content of knots is typically 0.5–3.0% of the digester output, while the shives content is about 0.1–1.0%.

=== Washing ===
The brownstock from the blowing goes to the washing stages where the used cooking liquors are separated from the cellulose fibers. Normally a pulp mill has 3-5 washing stages in series. Washing stages are also placed after oxygen delignification and between the bleaching stages as well. Pulp washers use countercurrent flow between the stages such that the pulp moves in the opposite direction to the flow of washing waters. Several processes are involved: thickening / dilution, displacement and diffusion. The dilution factor is the measure of the amount of water used in washing compared with the theoretical amount required to displace the liquor from the thickened pulp. Lower dilution factor reduces energy consumption, while higher dilution factor normally gives cleaner pulp. Thorough washing of the pulp reduces the chemical oxygen demand (COD).

Several types of washing equipment are in use, including pressure and atmospheric diffusers; vacuum drum washers; drum displacers; and wash presses.

=== Bleaching ===
In a modern mill, brownstock (cellulose fibers containing approximately 5% residual lignin) produced by the pulping is first washed to remove some of the dissolved organic material and then further delignified by a variety of bleaching stages.

In the case of a plant designed to produce pulp to make brown sack paper or linerboard for boxes and packaging, the pulp does not always need to be bleached to a high brightness. Bleaching decreases the mass of pulp produced by about 5%, decreases the strength of the fibers and adds to the cost of manufacture.

=== Process chemicals and reagents ===
Process chemicals are added to improve the production process:

- Impregnation aids. Surfactants may be used to improve impregnation of the wood chips with the cooking liquors.
- Anthraquinone is used as a digester additive. It works as a redox catalyst by oxidizing cellulose and reducing lignin. Its action protects the cellulose from degradation and makes the lignin more water-soluble.
- An emulsion breaker can be added in the soap separation to speed up and improve the separation of soap from the used cooking liquors by flocculation.
- Defoamers remove foam and speed up the production process. Drainage of washing equipment is improved and gives cleaner pulp.
- Dispersing agents, detackifiers and complexing agents keep the system cleaner and reduce the need for maintenance stops.
- Fixation agents fix finely dispersed potential deposits to the fibers and thereby transport them out of the process.

==== Liquors ====
- White liquor an aqueous solution of sodium hydroxide and sodium sulfide. The main reagent for delignification.
- Black liquor is the product of the delignification by the white liquor. It is depleted in sulfur and contains various resin soaps.
- Green liquor is the aqueous extract of smelt, the product of the recovery boiler. It is an aqueous solution of sodium carbonate and sodium sulfide (produced from sodium sulfate) and containing fine greenish particles of iron sulfides. Via the process called causticizing, green liquor is treated with lime to give white liquor.

== Comparison with other pulping processes ==
Pulp produced by the kraft process is stronger than that made by other pulping processes—it maintains a high effective sulfur ratio (sulfidity), an important determiner of the strength of the paper. Acidic sulfite processes degrade cellulose more than the kraft process, leading to weaker fibers.

As well, kraft pulping removes most of the lignin originally present in the wood, whereas mechanical pulping processes leave most of the lignin in the fibers. Lignin is hydrophobic in nature, and that hydrophobicity interferes with the formation of the hydrogen bonds between cellulose (and hemicellulose) in the fibers, which is needed for the strength of paper. (Strength refers to tensile strength and resistance to tearing.)

Kraft pulp is darker than other wood pulps, but it can be bleached to make very white pulp. Fully bleached kraft pulp is used to make high-quality paper where strength, whiteness, and resistance to yellowing are important. Kraft pulp's high cellulose and low lignin content is suited for paper for printing and writing, In contrast, mechanical pulp is produced by grinding wood without removing lignin. The lignin retained in mechanical pulp provides the opacity and bulk necessary for newsprint, but it results in lower tensile strength and limits the pulp's use in higher-grade applications.

The kraft process can use a wider range of fiber sources than most other pulping processes. All types of wood, including very resinous types like southern pine, and non-wood species like bamboo and kenaf can be used in the kraft process.

== Byproducts and emissions ==
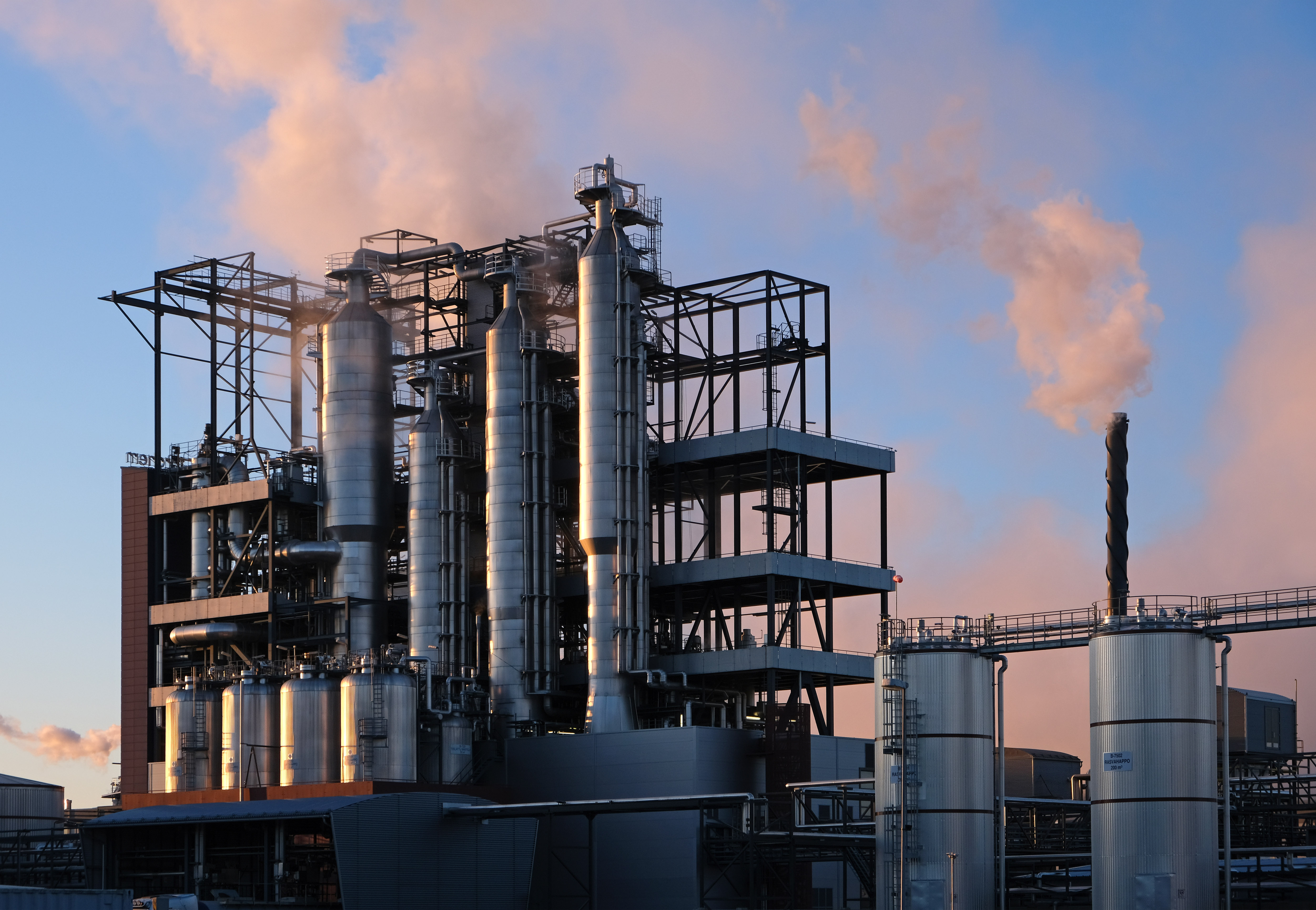
Forchem tall oil refinery in Rauma, Finland

The main byproducts of kraft pulping are crude sulfate turpentine and tall oil soap. The availability of these is strongly dependent on wood species, growth conditions, storage time of logs and chips, and the mill's process. Pines are the most extractive-rich woods. The raw turpentine is volatile and is distilled off the digester, while the raw soap is separated from the spent black liquor by decantation of the soap layer formed on top of the liquor storage tanks. From pines the average yield of turpentine is 5–10 kg/t pulp and of crude tall oil is 30–50 kg/t pulp.

Volatile organosulfur compounds are byproducts, especially methyl mercaptan, dimethyl sulfide, and dimethyl disulfide. These species result from the demethylation of methyl ethers, which are prevalent in lignin. The sulfur dioxide emissions of kraft-pulp mills are much lower than those from sulfite mills. In the ambient air outside a typical modern kraft-pulp mill, the sulfur-dioxide odour is perceivable only during disturbance situations, for example when the mill is shut down for maintenance, or during an extended power outage. Control of odours is achieved through the collection and burning of these odorous gases in the recovery boiler alongside the black liquor. In modern mills, where well-dried solids are burned in the recovery boiler, little sulfur dioxide leaves the boiler. At high boiler temperatures, the residues from the black liquor droplets react with sulfur dioxide, thereby effectively scavenging it by forming odourless sodium sulfate.

Pulp mills are almost always located near large bodies of water due to their substantial demand for water. Delignification of chemical pulps can release considerable amounts of organic material into rivers or lakes. The wastewater effluent has a high biological oxygen demand (BOD) and dissolved organic carbon (DOC). Other polluting components are chlorates, heavy metals, and chelating agents. The effluents can be treated in a biological effluent treatment plant.

Pulp and paper mills sometimes use chlorine bleaches. This chlorine can also lead to the emission of chlorocarbons such as carbon tetrachloride.

== See also ==
- H-factor
- Johan Richter
- Kappa number
- Organosolv
- Paper chemicals
- Soda pulping
