= Sulfite process =

Industrial process to extract pure cellulose from wood pulp

The sulfite process produces wood pulp that is almost pure cellulose fibers by treating wood chips with solutions of sulfite and bisulfite ions. These chemicals cleave the bonds between the cellulose and lignin components of the lignocellulose. A variety of sulfite/bisulfite salts are used, including sodium (Na^{+}), calcium (Ca^{2+}), potassium (K^{+}), magnesium (Mg^{2+}), and ammonium (NH_{4}^{+}). The lignin is converted to lignosulfonates, which are soluble and can be separated from the cellulose fibers. For the production of cellulose, the sulfite process competes with the Kraft process which produces stronger fibers and is less environmentally costly.

== History ==
The use of wood to make pulp for paper began with the development of mechanical pulping in the 1840s by Charles Fenerty in Nova Scotia and by F. G. Keller in Germany. Chemical processes quickly followed, first with Julius Roth's use of sulfurous acid to treat wood in 1857, followed by Benjamin Chew Tilghman's US patent on the use of calcium bisulfite, Ca(HSO_{3})_{2}, to pulp wood in 1867. Almost a decade later in 1874 the first commercial sulfite pulp mill was built in Sweden. It used magnesium as the counter ion and was based on work by Carl Daniel Ekman.

By 1900 sulfite pulping had become the dominant means of producing wood pulp, surpassing mechanical pulping methods. The competing chemical pulping process, the sulfate or kraft process was developed by Carl F. Dahl in 1879 and the first kraft mill started (in Sweden) in 1890. The first sulphite mill in the United States was the Richmond Paper Company in Rumford, Rhode Island in the mid-1880s. The invention of the recovery boiler by G. H. Tomlinson in the early 1930s allowed kraft mills to recycle almost all of their pulping chemicals. This, along with the ability of the kraft process to accept a wider variety of types of wood and produce stronger fibers made the kraft process the dominant pulping process starting in the 1940s. Sulfite pulps now account for less than 10% of the total chemical pulp production and the number of sulfite mills continues to decrease.

Magnesium was the standard counter ion until calcium replaced it in the 1950s.

== Pulping liquor preparation ==
The pulping liquor for most sulfite mills is generated by treating various bases (alkali metal or alkaline earth hydroxides) with sulfur dioxide:

SO_{2} + MOH → MHSO_{3}
MHSO_{3} + MOH → M_{2}SO_{3} + H_{2}O

Similar reactions are effected with divalent cations (Mg2+, Ca2+) and using carbonates in place of hydroxide.

The ratio of sulfite to bisulfite depends on pH; above pH=7, sulfite predominates.

Calcium-based

The earliest process used calcium, obtained as inexpensive calcium carbonate, and there was little incentive to recover the inorganic materials. At least in Sweden the brown liquor from this process was previously frequently used for producing ethanol, while with other brown liquors the fermentable hexose sugars are left to contribute to the energy needed in the recovery process. Calcium sulfite, which is poorly soluble, converts to calcium bisulfite only at low pH. Therefore calcium-based sulfite processes require acidic conditions.

Ammonia-based

Ammonia-based processes do not allow recovery of the pulping chemicals since ammonia or ammonium salts are oxidized to nitrogen and nitrogen oxides when burned.

Magnesium-based

The recovery process used in magnesium-based sulfite pulping the "Magnefite" process is well developed. The concentrated brown liquor is burned in a recovery boiler, producing magnesium oxide and sulfur dioxide, both of which are recovered from the flue gases. Magnesium oxide is recovered in a wet scrubber to give a slurry of magnesium hydroxide.

MgO + H_{2}O → Mg(OH)_{2}

This magnesium hydroxide slurry is then used in another scrubber to absorb sulfur dioxide from the flue gases producing a magnesium bisulfite solution that is clarified, filtered and used as the pulping liquor.

Mg(OH)_{2} + 2 SO_{2} → Mg(HSO_{3})_{2}

Sodium-based

Sodium-based processes use a recovery system similar to that used in the kraft recovery process, except that there is no "lime cycle".

== Processes involved in sulfite pulping ==
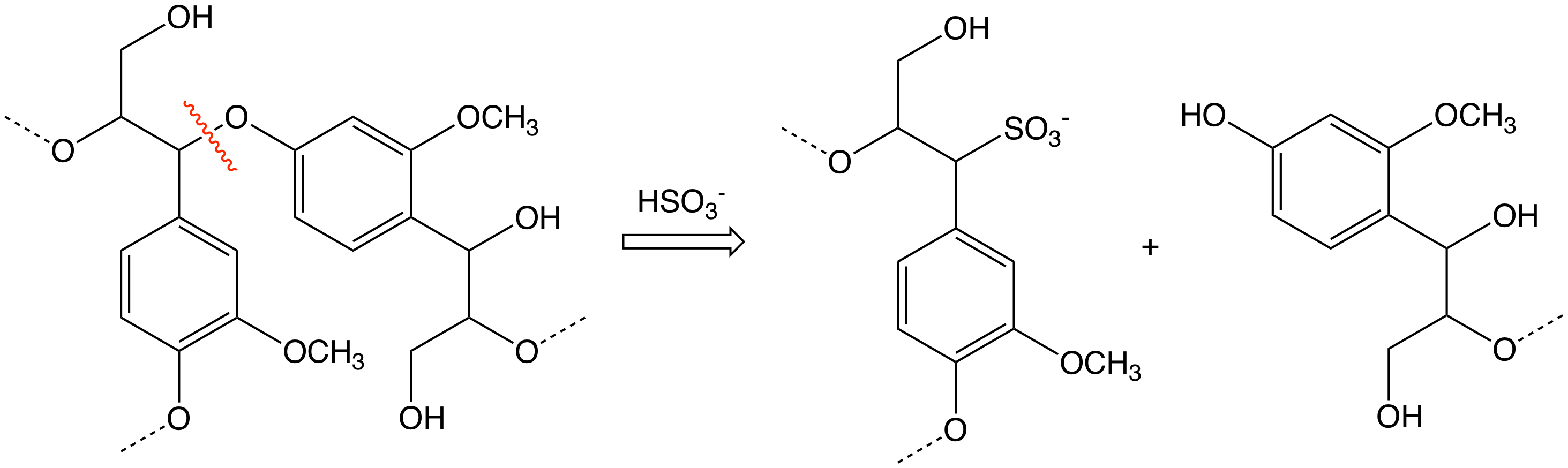
Scheme representing one lignin depolymerization reaction in the sulfite process.

The process is conducted in large pressure vessels called digesters. Sulfite pulping is carried out between pH 1.5 and 5. The pulp is in contact with the pulping chemicals for 4 to 14 hours and at temperatures ranging from 130 to 160 °C (266 to 320 °F), again depending on the chemicals used.

Most of the intermediates involved in delignification in sulfite pulping are resonance-stabilized carbocations formed either by protonation of carbon-carbon double bonds or acidic cleavage of ether bonds which connect many of the constituents of lignin. It is the latter reaction which is responsible for most lignin degradation in the sulfite process. The electrophilic carbocations react with bisulfite ions (HSO_{3}^{−})to give sulfonates.

R-O-R' + H^{+} → R^{+} + R'OH
R^{+} + HSO_{3}^{−} → R-SO_{3}H

The sulfite process does not degrade lignin to the same extent that the kraft process does and the lignosulfonates from the sulfite process are useful byproducts.

=== Chemical recovery ===
The spent cooking liquor from sulfite pulping is usually called brown liquor, but the terms red liquor, thick liquor and sulfite liquor are also used (compared to black liquor in the kraft process). Pulp washers, using countercurrent flow, remove the spent cooking chemicals and degraded lignin and hemicellulose. The extracted brown liquor is concentrated, in multiple effect evaporators. The concentrated brown liquor can be burned in the recovery boiler to generate steam and recover the inorganic chemicals for reuse in the pulping process or it can be neutralized to recover the useful byproducts of pulping. Recent developments in Chemrec's black liquor gasification process, adapting the technology to use in the sulfite pulping process, could make second generation biofuels production an alternative to the conventional recovery boiler technology. Around 1906 Gösta Ekström a Swedish engineer patented a process of ethanol generation from the residual 2-2.5% fermentable hexose sugars in the spent liquor.

The sulfite process can use calcium, ammonium, magnesium or sodium as a base.

== Applications ==
The sulfite process is acidic and one of the drawbacks is that the acidic conditions hydrolyze some of the cellulose, which means that sulfite pulp fibers are not as strong as kraft pulp fibers. The yield of pulp (based on wood used) is higher than for kraft pulping and sulfite pulp is easier to bleach.

=== Commodity ===
Sulfite pulp remains an important commodity, especially for specialty papers and as a source of cellulose for non-paper applications. It is used to make fine paper, tissue, glassine, and to add strength to newsprint.

=== Dissolving pulp ===
A special grade of bleached sulfite pulp is known as dissolving pulp which is the raw material for a wide variety of cellulose derivatives, for example rayon, cellophane, cellulose acetate and methylcellulose.

Rayon is a reconstituted cellulose fiber used to make many fabrics.

Cellophane is a clear reconstituted cellulose film used in wrapping and windows in envelopes.

Cellulose acetate was used to make flexible films for photographic use, computer tapes and so on and also to make fibers.

Methylcellulose and other cellulose ether derivatives are used in a wide range of everyday products from adhesives to baked goods to pharmaceuticals.

== Byproducts ==
Sulfite pulping is generally less destructive than kraft pulping, so there are more usable byproducts.

=== Lignosulfonates ===
Chief among sulfite process byproducts are lignosulfonates, which find a wide variety of uses where a relatively inexpensive agent is needed to make a water dispersion of a water-insoluble material. Lignosulfonates are used in tanning leather, making concrete, drilling mud, drywall and so on.

Oxidation of lignosulfonates was used to produce vanillin (artificial vanilla), and this process is still used by one supplier (Borregaard, Norway) while all North American production by this route ceased in the 1990s.

=== Other byproducts ===
Acid hydrolysis of hemicelluloses during sulfite pulping produces monosaccharides, predominantly mannose for softwoods and xylose for hardwoods, which can be fermented to produce ethanol.

== See also ==
- Pulp mill
