= Pulp (paper) =

Fibrous material used notably in papermaking

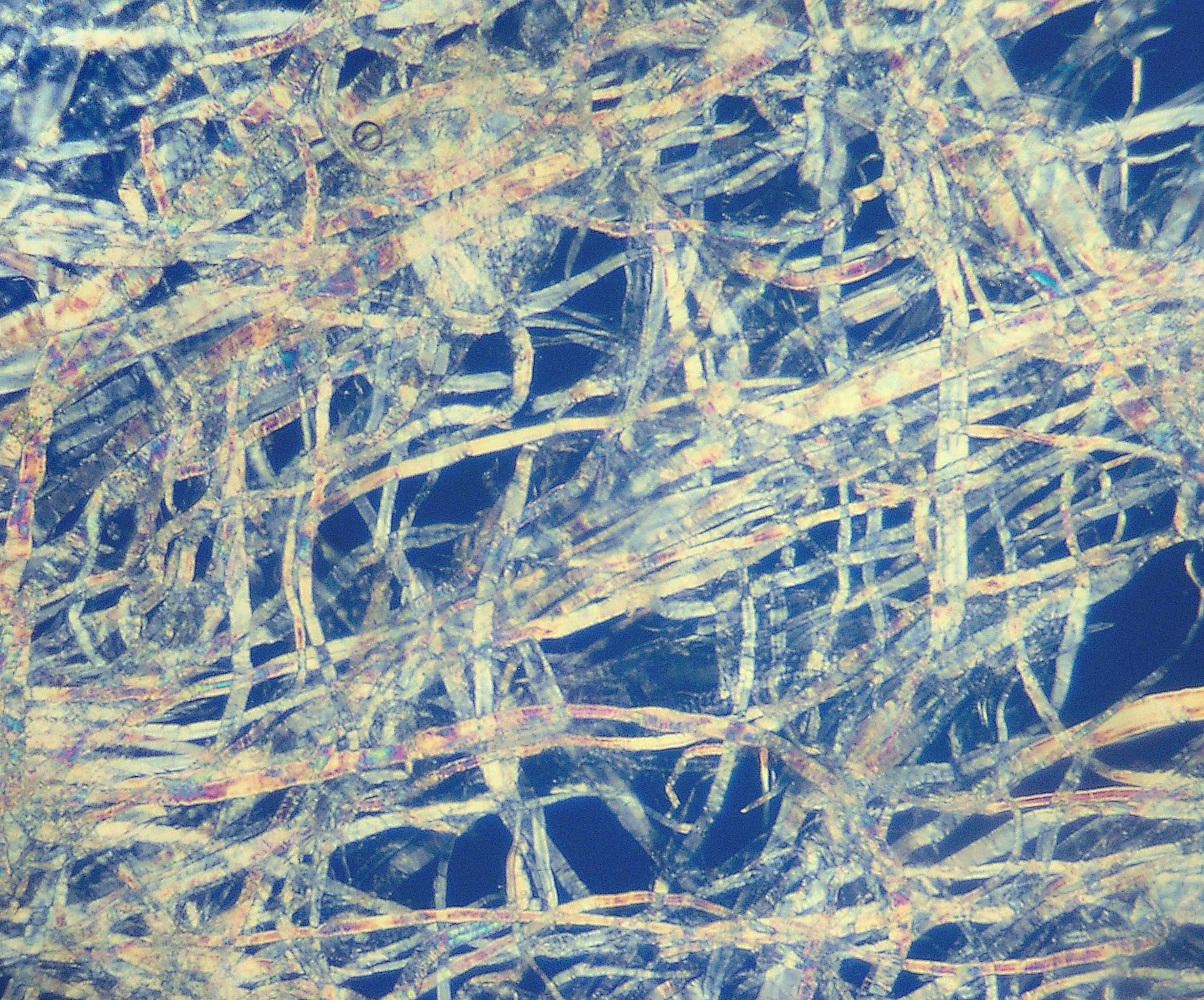
Structural fibres of pulp

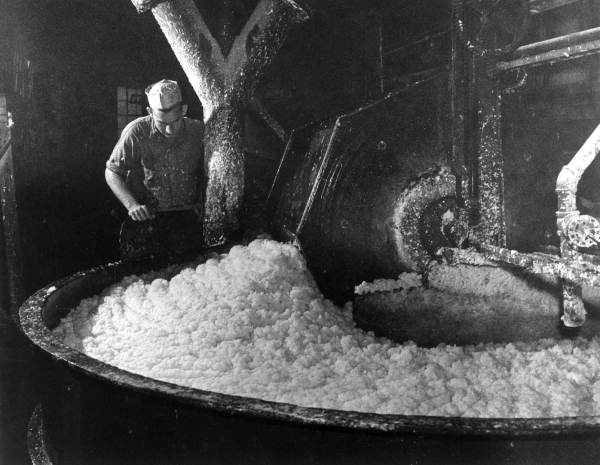
Pulp at a paper mill near Pensacola, 1947

Pulp is a fibrous lignocellulosic material prepared by chemically, semi-chemically, or mechanically isolating the cellulosic fibers of wood, fiber crops, waste paper, or rags. Mixed with water and other chemicals or plant-based additives, pulp is the major raw material used in papermaking and the industrial production of other paper products.

== History ==
Before the widely acknowledged invention of papermaking by Cai Lun in China around AD 105, paper-like writing materials such as papyrus and amate were produced by ancient civilizations using plant materials which were largely unprocessed. Strips of bark or bast material were woven together, beaten into rough sheets, dried, and polished by hand. Pulp used in modern and traditional papermaking is distinguished by the maceration process which produces a finer, more regular slurry of cellulose fibers which are pulled out of solution by a screen and dried to form sheets or rolls. The earliest paper produced in China consisted of bast fibers from the paper mulberry (kozo) plant along with hemp rag and net scraps. By the 6th century, the mulberry tree was domesticated by farmers in China specifically for the purpose of producing pulp to be used in the papermaking process. In addition to mulberry, pulp was also made from bamboo, hibiscus bark, blue sandalwood, straw, and cotton. Papermaking using pulp made from hemp and linen fibers from tattered clothing, fishing nets and fabric bags spread to Europe in the 13th century, with an ever-increasing use of rags being central to the manufacture and affordability of rag paper, a factor in the development of printing. By the 1800s, production demands on the newly industrialized papermaking and printing industries led to a shift in raw materials, most notably the use of pulpwood and other tree products which today make up more than 95% of global pulp production.

Five seminal steps in ancient Chinese papermaking outlined in a woodcut
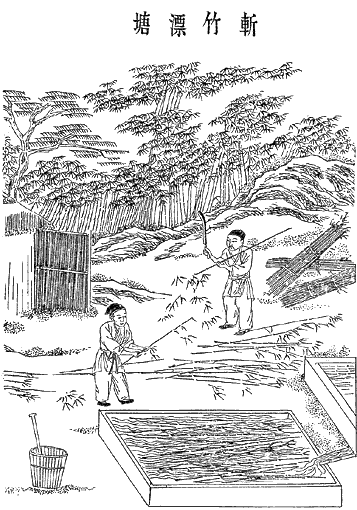
Step 1, Harvesting

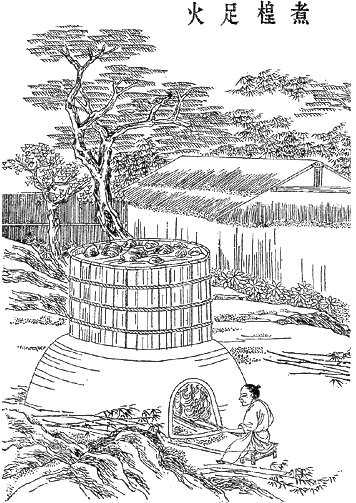
Step 2, Cooking

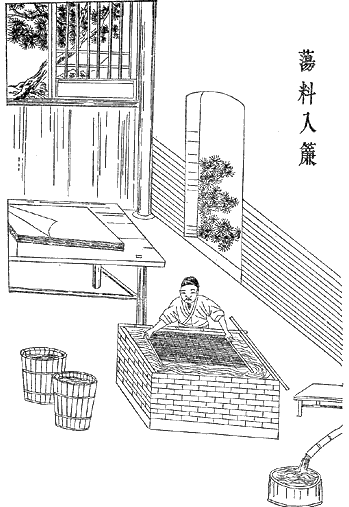
Step 3, Making sheets

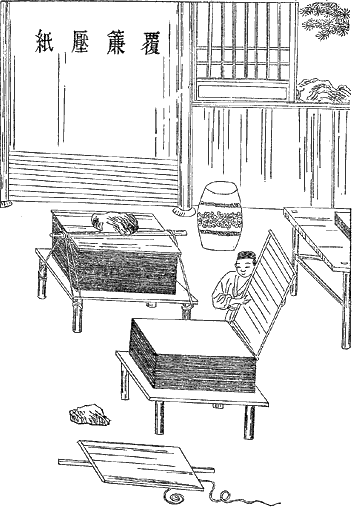
Step 4, Packaging

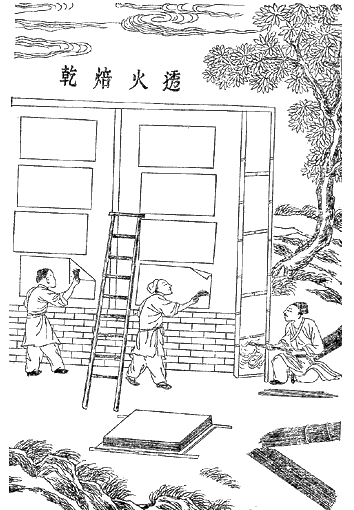
Step 5, Drying

The use of wood pulp and the invention of automatic paper machines in the late 18th- and early 19th-century contributed to paper's status as an inexpensive commodity in modern times. While some of the earliest examples of paper made from wood pulp include works published by Jacob Christian Schäffer in 1765 and Matthias Koops in 1800, large-scale wood paper production began in the 1840s with unique, simultaneous developments in mechanical pulping made by Friedrich Gottlob Keller in Germany and by Charles Fenerty in Nova Scotia. Chemical processes quickly followed, first with J. Roth's use of sulfurous acid to treat wood, then by Benjamin Tilghman's U.S. patent on the use of calcium bisulfite, Ca(HSO_{3})_{2}, to pulp wood in 1867. Almost a decade later, the first commercial sulfite pulp mill was built, in Sweden. It used magnesium as the counter ion and was based on work by Carl Daniel Ekman. By 1900, sulfite pulping had become the dominant means of producing wood pulp, surpassing mechanical pulping methods. The competing chemical pulping process, the sulfate, or kraft, process, was developed by Carl F. Dahl in 1879; the first kraft mill started, in Sweden, in 1890. The invention of the recovery boiler, by G.H. Tomlinson in the early 1930s, allowed kraft mills to recycle almost all of their pulping chemicals. This, along with the ability of the kraft process to accept a wider variety of types of wood and to produce stronger fibres, made the kraft process the dominant pulping process, starting in the 1940s.

Global production of wood pulp in 2006 was 175 million tons (160 million tonnes). In the previous year, 63 million tons (57 million tonnes) of market pulp (not made into paper in the same facility) was sold, with Canada being the largest source at 21 percent of the total, followed by the United States at 16 percent. The wood fiber sources required for pulping are "45% sawmill residue, 21% logs and chips, and 34% recycled paper" (Canada, 2014). Chemical pulp made up 93% of market pulp.

== Wood pulp ==
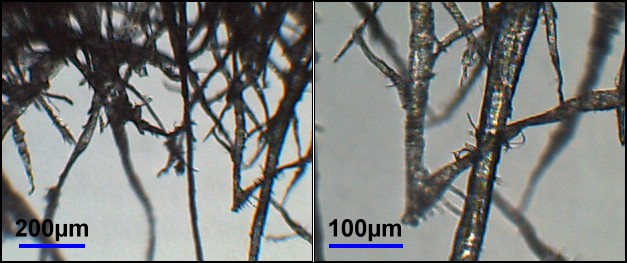
Fibres in wood pulp

The timber resources used to make wood pulp are referred to as pulpwood. While in theory any tree can be used for pulp-making, coniferous trees are preferred because the cellulose fibers in the pulp of these species are longer, and therefore make stronger paper. Some of the most commonly used trees for paper making include softwoods such as spruce, pine, fir, larch and hemlock, and hardwoods such as eucalyptus, aspen and birch. There is also increasing interest in genetically modified tree species (such as GM eucalyptus and GM poplar) because of several major benefits these can provide, such as increased ease of breaking down lignin and increased growth rate.

A pulp mill is a manufacturing facility that converts wood chips or other plant fibre source into a thick fiberboard which can be shipped to a paper mill for further processing. Pulp can be manufactured using mechanical, semi-chemical or fully chemical methods (kraft and sulfite processes). The finished product may be either bleached or non-bleached, depending on the customer requirements.

Wood and other plant materials used to make pulp contain three main components (apart from water): cellulose fibers (desired for papermaking), lignin (a three-dimensional polymer that binds the cellulose fibres together) and hemicelluloses (shorter branched carbohydrate polymers). The aim of pulping is to break down the bulk structure of the fibre source, be it chips, stems or other plant parts, into the constituent fibres.

Chemical pulping achieves this by degrading the lignin and hemicellulose into small, water-soluble molecules which can be washed away from the cellulose fibres without depolymerizing the cellulose fibres (chemically depolymerizing the cellulose weakens the fibres). The various mechanical pulping methods, such as groundwood (GW) and refiner mechanical pulping (RMP), physically tear the cellulose fibres one from another. Much of the lignin remains adhering to the fibres. Strength is impaired because the fibres may be cut. There are a number of related hybrid pulping methods that use a combination of chemical and thermal treatment to begin an abbreviated chemical pulping process, followed immediately by a mechanical treatment to separate the fibres. These hybrid methods include thermomechanical pulping, also known as TMP, and chemithermomechanical pulping, also known as CTMP. The chemical and thermal treatments reduce the amount of energy subsequently required by the mechanical treatment, and also reduce the amount of strength loss suffered by the fibres.

Global pulp production by category (2000)
Pulp category	Production [M ton]
Chemical	131.2
Kraft	117.0
Sulfite	7.0
Semichemical	7.2
Mechanical	37.8
Nonwood	18.0
Total virgin fibres	187.0
Recovered fibres	147.0
Total pulp	334.0

=== Harvesting trees ===
Creating pulp begins with harvesting wood from trees, and forest management is necessary to ensure a continued supply. Pulp tree plantations account for 16 percent of world pulp production, old-growth forests 9 percent, and second- and third- and more generation forests account for the rest. Reforestation is practiced in most areas, so trees are a renewable resource. The FSC (Forest Stewardship Council), SFI (Sustainable Forestry Initiative), PEFC (Programme for the Endorsement of Forest Certification), and other bodies certify paper made from trees harvested according to guidelines meant to ensure good forestry practices.

The number of trees consumed depends on whether mechanical processes or chemical processes are used. It has been estimated that based on a mixture of softwoods and hardwoods 12 metres (40 ft) tall and 15–20 centimetres (6–8 in) in diameter, it would take an average of 24 trees to produce 0.9 tonne (1 ton) of printing and writing paper, using the kraft process (chemical pulping). Mechanical pulping is about twice as efficient in using trees, since almost all of the wood is used to make fibre, therefore it takes about 12 trees to make 0.9 tonne (1 ton) of mechanical pulp or newsprint.

There are roughly two short tons in a cord of wood.

=== Preparation for pulping ===
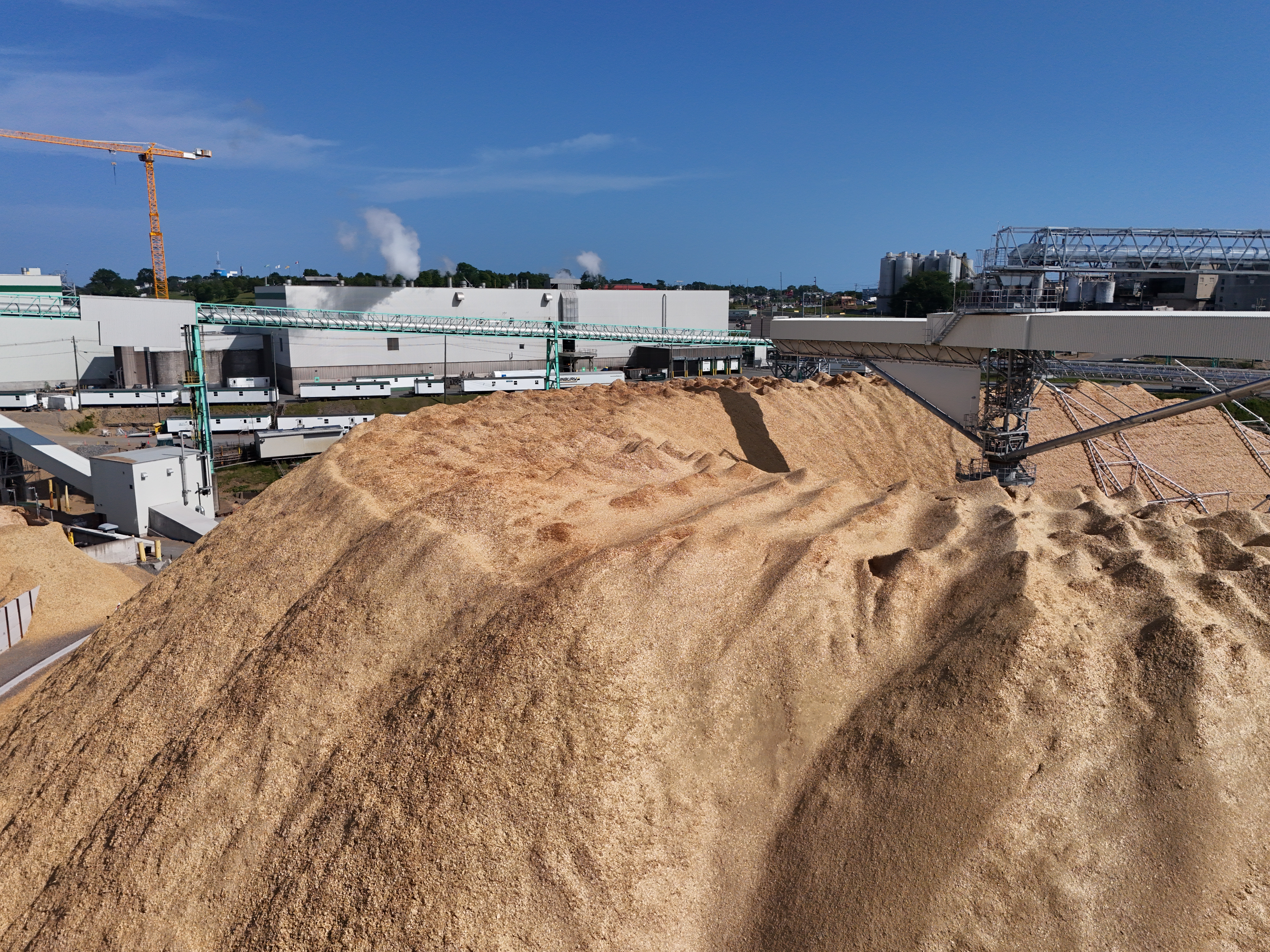
A wood-chip stockpile with elevated conveyor systems

Woodchipping is the act and industry of chipping wood for pulp, but also for other processed wood products and mulch. Only the heartwood and sapwood are useful for making pulp. Bark contains relatively few useful fibers and is removed and used as fuel to provide steam for use in the pulp mill. Most pulping processes require that the wood be chipped and screened to provide uniform sized chips.

=== Pulping ===
There are a number of different processes which can be used to separate the wood fiber:

==== Mechanical pulp ====
Manufactured grindstones with embedded silicon carbide or aluminum oxide can be used to grind small wood logs called "bolts" to make stone groundwood pulp (SGW). If the wood is steamed prior to grinding it is known as pressurised groundwood pulp (PGW). Most modern mills use chips rather than logs and ridged metal discs called refiner plates instead of grindstones. If the chips are just ground up with the plates, the pulp is called refiner mechanical pulp (RMP) and if the chips are steamed while being refined the pulp is called thermomechanical pulp (TMP). Steam treatment significantly reduces the total energy needed to make the pulp and decreases the damage (cutting) to fibres. Mechanical pulps are used for products that require less strength, such as newsprint and paperboards.

==== Thermomechanical pulp ====
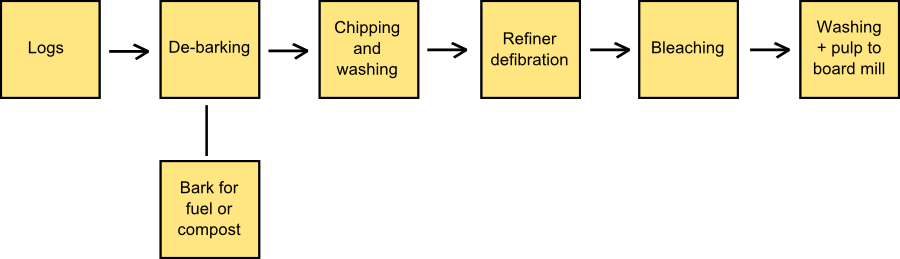
Mechanical pulping process

Thermomechanical pulp is pulp produced by processing wood chips using heat (thus "thermo-") and a mechanical refining movement (thus "-mechanical"). It is a two-stage process where the logs are first stripped of their bark and converted into small chips. These chips have a moisture content of around 25–30 percent. A mechanical force is applied to the wood chips in a crushing or grinding action which generates heat and water vapour and softens the lignin thus separating the individual fibres. The pulp is then screened and cleaned, any clumps of fibre are reprocessed. This process gives a high yield of fibre from the timber (around 95 percent) and as the lignin has not been removed, the fibres are hard and rigid.

==== Chemi-thermomechanical pulp ====
Wood chips can be pre-treated with sodium carbonate, sodium hydroxide, sodium sulfate and other chemicals prior to refining with equipment similar to a mechanical mill. The conditions of the chemical treatment are much less vigorous (lower temperature, shorter time, less extreme pH) than in a chemical pulping process since the goal is to make the fibers easier to refine, not to remove lignin as in a fully chemical process. Pulps made using these hybrid processes are known as chemi-thermomechanical pulps (CTMP).

==== Chemical pulp ====
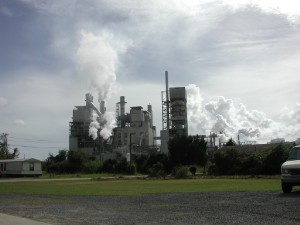
International Paper Company, a pulp mill that makes fluff pulp for use in absorbent products with the Kraft process

Chemical pulp is produced by combining wood chips and chemicals in large vessels called digesters. There, heat and chemicals break down lignin, which binds cellulose fibres together, without seriously degrading the cellulose fibres. Chemical pulp is used for materials that need to be stronger or combined with mechanical pulps to give a product different characteristics. The kraft process is the dominant chemical pulping method, with the sulfite process second. Historically soda pulping was the first successful chemical pulping method.

==== Recycled pulp ====
Recycled pulp is also called deinked pulp (DIP). DIP is recycled paper which has been processed by chemicals, thus removing printing inks and other unwanted elements and freeing the paper fibres. The process is called deinking.

DIP is used as raw material in papermaking. Many newsprint, toilet paper and facial tissue grades commonly contain 100 percent deinked pulp and in many other grades, such as lightweight coated for offset and printing and writing papers for office and home use, DIP makes up a substantial proportion of the furnish.

==== Organosolv pulping ====
Organosolv pulping uses organic solvents at temperatures above 140 °C to break down lignin and hemicellulose into soluble fragments. The pulping liquor is easily recovered by distillation. The reason for using a solvent is to make the lignin more soluble in the cooking liquor. Most common used solvents are methanol, ethanol, formic acid and acetic acid often in combination with water.

==== Alternative pulping methods ====
Research is under way to develop biopulping (biological pulping), similar to chemical pulping but using certain species of fungi that are able to break down the unwanted lignin, but not the cellulose fibres. In the biopulping process, the fungal enzyme lignin peroxidase selectively digests lignin to leave remaining cellulose fibres. This could have major environmental benefits in reducing the pollution associated with chemical pulping. The pulp is bleached using chlorine dioxide stage followed by neutralization and calcium hypochlorite. The oxidizing agent in either case oxidizes and destroys the dyes formed from the tannins of the wood and accentuated (reinforced) by sulfides present in it.

Steam exploded fibre is a pulping and extraction technique that has been applied to wood and other fibrous organic material.

=== Bleaching ===
The pulp produced up to this point in the process can be bleached to produce a white paper product. The chemicals used to bleach pulp have been a source of environmental concern, and recently the pulp industry has been using alternatives to chlorine, such as chlorine dioxide, oxygen, ozone and hydrogen peroxide.

== Alternatives to wood pulp ==
Pulp made from non-wood plant sources or recycled textiles is manufactured today largely as a speciality product for fine-printing and art purposes. Modern machine- and hand-made art papers made with cotton, linen, hemp, abaca, kozo, and other fibers are often valued for their longer, stronger fibers and their lower lignin content. Lignin, present in virtually all plant materials, contributes to the acidification and eventual breakdown of paper products, often characterized by the browning and embrittling of paper with a high lignin content such as newsprint. 100% cotton or a combination of cotton and linen pulp is widely used to produce documents intended for long-term use, such as certificates, currency, and passports.

Today, some groups advocate using field crop fibre or agricultural residues instead of wood fibre as a more sustainable means of production.

There is enough straw to meet much of North America's book, magazine, catalogue and copy paper needs. Agricultural-based paper does not come from tree farms. Some agricultural residue pulps take less time to cook than wood pulps. That means agricultural-based paper uses less energy, less water and fewer chemicals. Pulp made from wheat and flax straw has half the ecological footprint of pulp made from forests.

Hemp paper is a possible replacement, but processing infrastructure, storage costs and the low usability percentage of the plant means it is not a ready substitute.

However, wood is also a renewable resource, with about 90 percent of pulp coming from plantations or reforested areas. Non-wood fibre sources account for about 5–10 percent of global pulp production, for a variety of reasons, including seasonal availability, problems with chemical recovery, brightness of the pulp etc. In China, as of 2009, a higher proportion of non-wood pulp processing increased use of water and energy.

Nonwovens are in some applications alternatives to paper made from wood pulp, like filter paper or tea bags.

Comparison of typical feedstocks used in pulping
Component	Wood	Nonwood
Carbohydrates	65–80%	50–80%
– Cellulose	40–45%	30–45%
– Hemicellulose	23–35%	20–35%
Lignin	20–30%	10–25%
Extractives	2–5%	5–15%
Proteins	<0.5%	5–10%
Inorganics	0.1–1%	0.5–10%
– SiO_{2}	<0.1%	0.5–7%

== Market pulp ==
Market pulp is any variety of pulp that is produced in one location, dried and shipped to another location for further processing. Important quality parameters for pulp not directly related to the fibres are brightness, dirt levels, viscosity and ash content. In 2004 it accounted for about 55 million metric tons of market pulp.

Air dry pulp is the most common form to sell pulp. This is pulp dried to about 10 percent moisture content. It is normally delivered as sheeted bales of 250 kg. The reason to leave 10 percent moisture in the pulp is that this minimizes the fibre to fibre bonding and makes it easier to disperse the pulp in water for further processing to paper.

Roll pulp or reel pulp is the most common delivery form of pulp to non traditional pulp markets. Fluff pulp is normally shipped on rolls (reels). This pulp is dried to 5–6 percent moisture content. At the customer this is going to a comminution process to prepare for further processing.

Some pulps are flash dried. This is done by pressing the pulp to about 50 percent moisture content and then let it fall through silos that are 15–17 m high. Gas fired hot air is the normal heat source. The temperature is well above the char point of cellulose, but large amount of moisture in the fibre wall and lumen prevents the fibres from being incinerated. It is often not dried down to 10 percent moisture (air dry). The bales are not as densely packed as air dry pulp.

== Environmental concerns ==
The major environmental impacts of producing wood pulp come from its impact on forest sources and from its waste products.

=== Forest resources ===
The impact of logging to provide the raw material for wood pulp is an area of intense debate. Modern logging practices, using forest management seek to provide a reliable, renewable source of raw materials for pulp mills. The practice of clear cutting is a particularly sensitive issue since it is a very visible effect of logging. Reforestation, the planting of tree seedlings on logged areas, has also been criticized for decreasing biodiversity because reforested areas are monocultures. Logging of old growth forests accounts for less than 10 percent of wood pulp, but is one of the most controversial issues.

=== Effluents from pulp mills ===
The process effluents are treated in a biological effluent treatment plant, which guarantees that the effluents are not toxic in the recipient.

Mechanical pulp is not a major cause for environmental concern since most of the organic material is retained in the pulp, and the chemicals used (hydrogen peroxide and sodium dithionite) produce benign byproducts (water and sodium sulfate (finally), respectively).

Chemical pulp mills, especially kraft mills, are energy self-sufficient and very nearly closed cycle with respect to inorganic chemicals.

Bleaching with chlorine produces large amounts of organochlorine compounds, including polychlorinated dibenzo-p-dioxins, polychlorinated dibenzofurans (PCDD/Fs). Many mills have adopted alternatives to chlorinated bleaching agents thereby reducing emissions of organochlorine pollution.

=== Odor problems ===
The kraft pulping reaction in particular releases foul-smelling compounds. The sulfide reagent that degrades lignin structure also causes some demethylation, yielding methanethiol, dimethyl sulfide, and dimethyl disulfide. These same compounds are released during many forms of microbial decay, including the internal microbial action in Camembert cheese, although the kraft process is a chemical one and does not involve any microbial degradation. These compounds have extremely low odor thresholds and disagreeable smells.

== Applications ==
The main applications for pulp are paper and board production. The furnish of pulps used depends on the quality on the finished paper. Important quality parameters are wood furnish, brightness, viscosity, extractives, dirt count and strength.

Chemical pulps are used for making nanocellulose.

Speciality pulp grades have many other applications. Dissolving pulp is used in making regenerated cellulose that is used textile and cellophane production. It is also used to make cellulose derivatives. Fluff pulp is used in diapers, feminine hygiene products and nonwovens.

=== Paper production ===
The Fourdrinier Machine is the basis for most modern papermaking, and it has been used in some variation since its conception. It accomplishes all the steps needed to transform pulp into a final paper product.

== Economics ==
In 2009, NBSK pulp sold for $650/ton in the United States. The price had dropped due to falling demand when newspapers reduced their size, in part, as a result of the recession. By 2024 this price had recovered to $1315/ton.

== See also ==
- Acid paper
- Nanocellulose
- Paper chemicals
- Pulp mill
- Pulpwood
- Tree-free paper
- Johan Richter, developer of the process for continuous cooking of pulp
- World Forestry Congress

== Bibliography ==
- "Pulp and Paper", Environment Canada, Government of Canada, 2014, archived from the original on 2016-04-21
- Schäffer, Jacob Christian (1765). Versuche und Muster ohne alle Lumpen oder doch mit enem geringen Zusatze derselben Papier zu machen.
