= Oxonium ion =

Cation containing an oxygen atom with 3 bonds and 1+ formal charge

In chemistry, an oxonium ion is any cation containing an oxygen atom that has three bonds and 1+ formal charge. The simplest oxonium ion is the hydronium ion (H_{3}O^{+}).

== Alkyloxonium ==
Hydronium is one of a series of oxonium ions with the formula R_{n}H_{3−n}O^{+}. Oxygen is usually pyramidal with an sp^{3} hybridization.

Those with n = 1 are called primary oxonium ions ROH^{+}_{2}, an example being protonated alcohol (e.g. protonated methanol is methyloxonium CH_{3}OH^{+}_{2}). In acidic media, the oxonium functional group produced by protonating an alcohol can be a leaving group in the E2 elimination reaction. The product is an alkene. Extreme acidity, heat, and dehydrating conditions are usually required. Other hydrocarbon oxonium ions are formed by protonation or alkylation of alcohols or ethers.

Secondary oxonium ions have the formula R_{2}OH^{+}, an example being protonated ethers (e.g. protonated dimethyl ether is dimethyloxonium (CH_{3})_{2}OH^{+}).

Tertiary oxonium ions have the formula R_{3}O^{+}, an example being trimethyloxonium (CH_{3})_{3}O^{+}. Tertiary alkyloxonium salts are useful alkylating agents. For example, triethyloxonium tetrafluoroborate [(CH_{3}CH_{2})_{3}O]^{+}[BF_{4}]^{−}, a white crystalline solid, can be used, for example, to produce ethyl esters when the conditions of traditional Fischer esterification are unsuitable. It is also used for preparation of enol ethers and related functional groups.

general pyramidal oxonium ion	skeletal formula of the trimethyloxonium cation	ball-and-stick model of trimethyloxonium	space-filling model of trimethyloxonium

Oxatriquinane and oxatriquinacene are unusually stable oxonium ions, first described in 2008. Oxatriquinane does not react with boiling water or with alcohols, thiols, halide ions, or amines, although it does react with stronger nucleophiles such as hydroxide, cyanide, and azide.

== Oxocarbenium ions ==
Another class of oxonium ions encountered in organic chemistry is the oxocarbenium ions, obtained by protonation or alkylation of a carbonyl group e.g. R−C=−R′ which forms a resonance structure with the fully-fledged carbocation R−−O−R′ and is therefore especially stable:

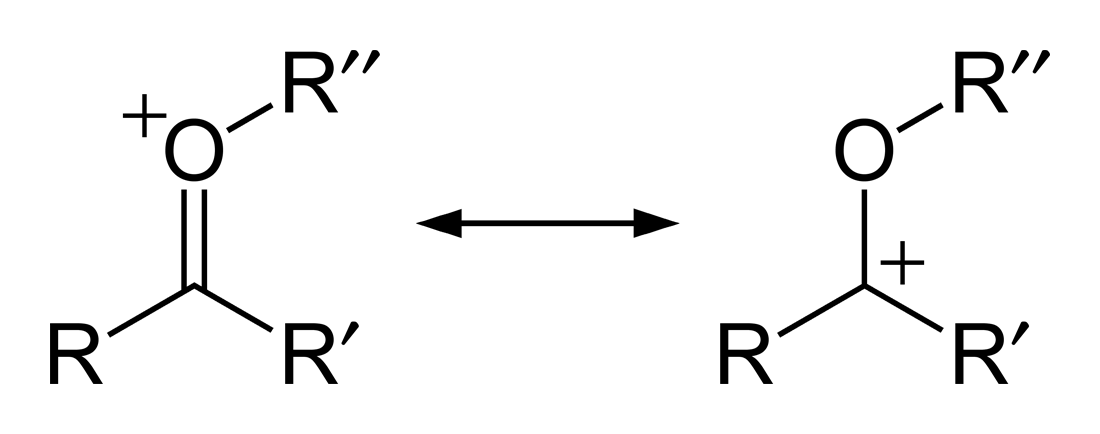

== Gold-stabilized species ==
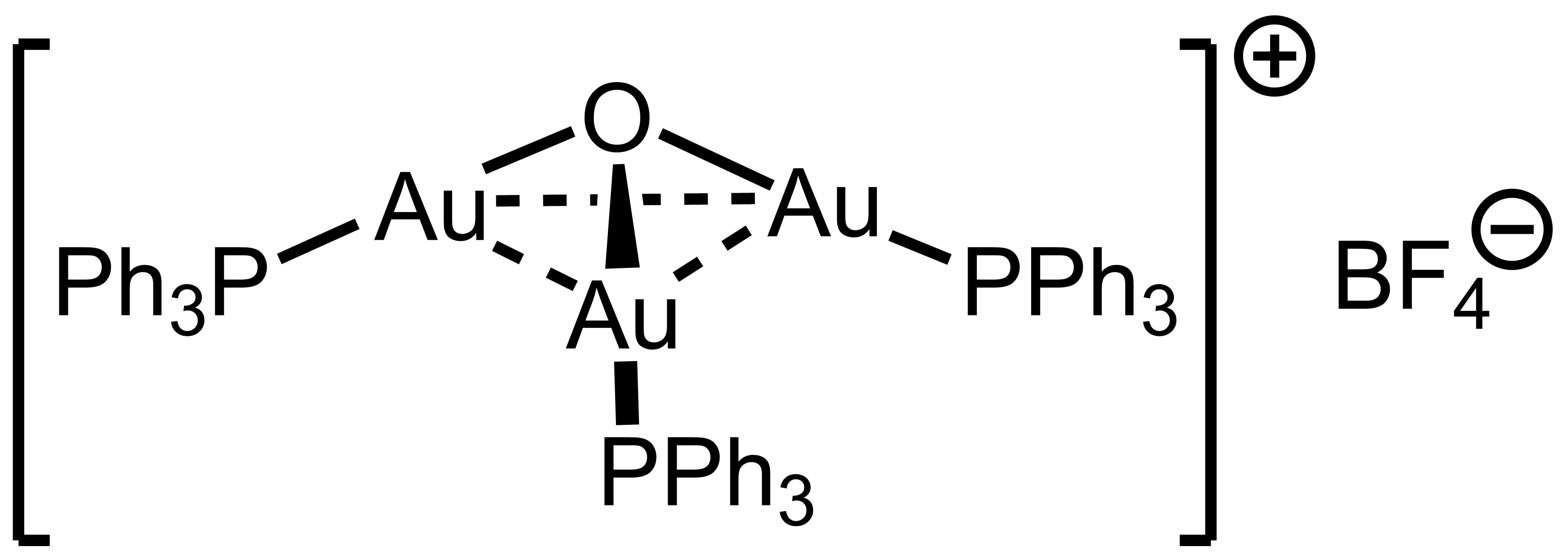

An unusually stable oxonium species is the gold complex tris[triphenylphosphinegold(I)]oxonium tetrafluoroborate, [(Ph_{3}PAu)_{3}O]^{+}[BF_{4}]^{−}, where the intramolecular aurophilic interactions between the gold atoms are believed responsible for the stabilisation of the cation. This complex is prepared by treatment of Ph_{3}PAuCl with Ag_{2}O in the presence of NaBF_{4}:

3 Ph_{3}PAuCl + Ag_{2}O + Na^{+}[BF_{4}]^{−} → [(Ph_{3}PAu)_{3}O]^{+}[BF_{4}]^{−} + 2 AgCl + NaCl

It has been used as a catalyst for the propargyl Claisen rearrangement.

== Relevance to natural product chemistry ==
Complex bicyclic and tricyclic oxonium ions have been proposed as key intermediates in the biosynthesis of a series of natural products by the red algae of the genus Laurencia.

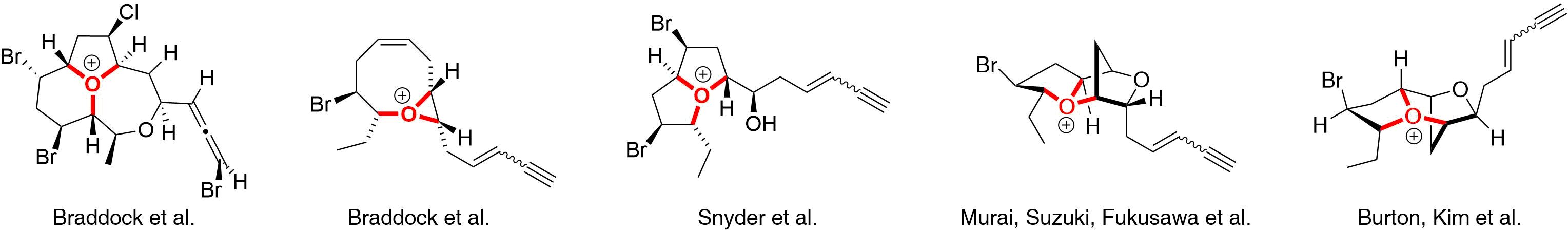

Several members of these elusive species have been prepared explicitly by total synthesis, demonstrating the possibility of their existence. The key to their successful generation was the use of a weakly coordinating anion (Krossing's anion, [Al(pftb)_{4}]^{−}, pftb = perfluoro-tert-butoxy) as the counteranion. As shown in the example below, this was executed by a transannular halide abstraction strategy through the reaction of the oxonium ion precursor (an organic halide) with the silver salt of the Krossing's anion Ag[Al(pftb)_{4}]•CH_{2}Cl_{2}, generating the desired oxonium ion with simultaneous precipitation of inorganic silver halides. The resulting oxonium ions were characterized comprehensively by nuclear magnetic resonance spectroscopy at low temperature (−78 °C) with support from density functional theory computation.

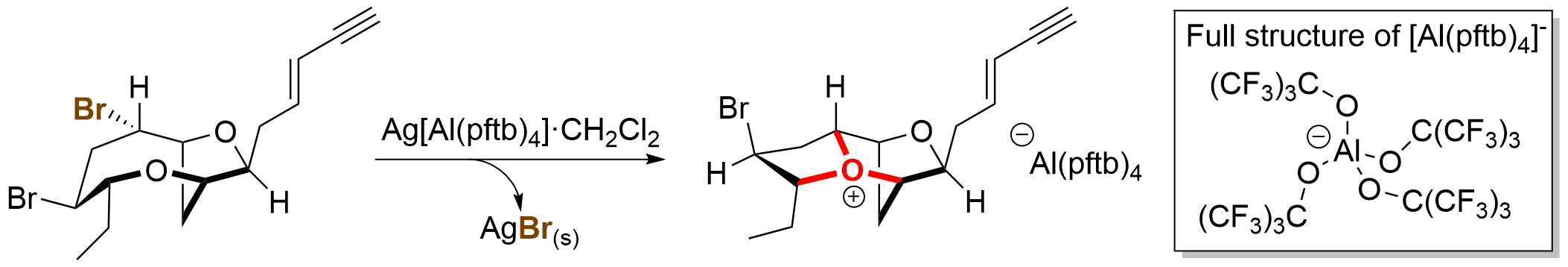

These oxonium ions were also demonstrated to directly give rise to multiple related natural products by reacting with various nucleophiles, such as water, bromide, chloride, and acetate.

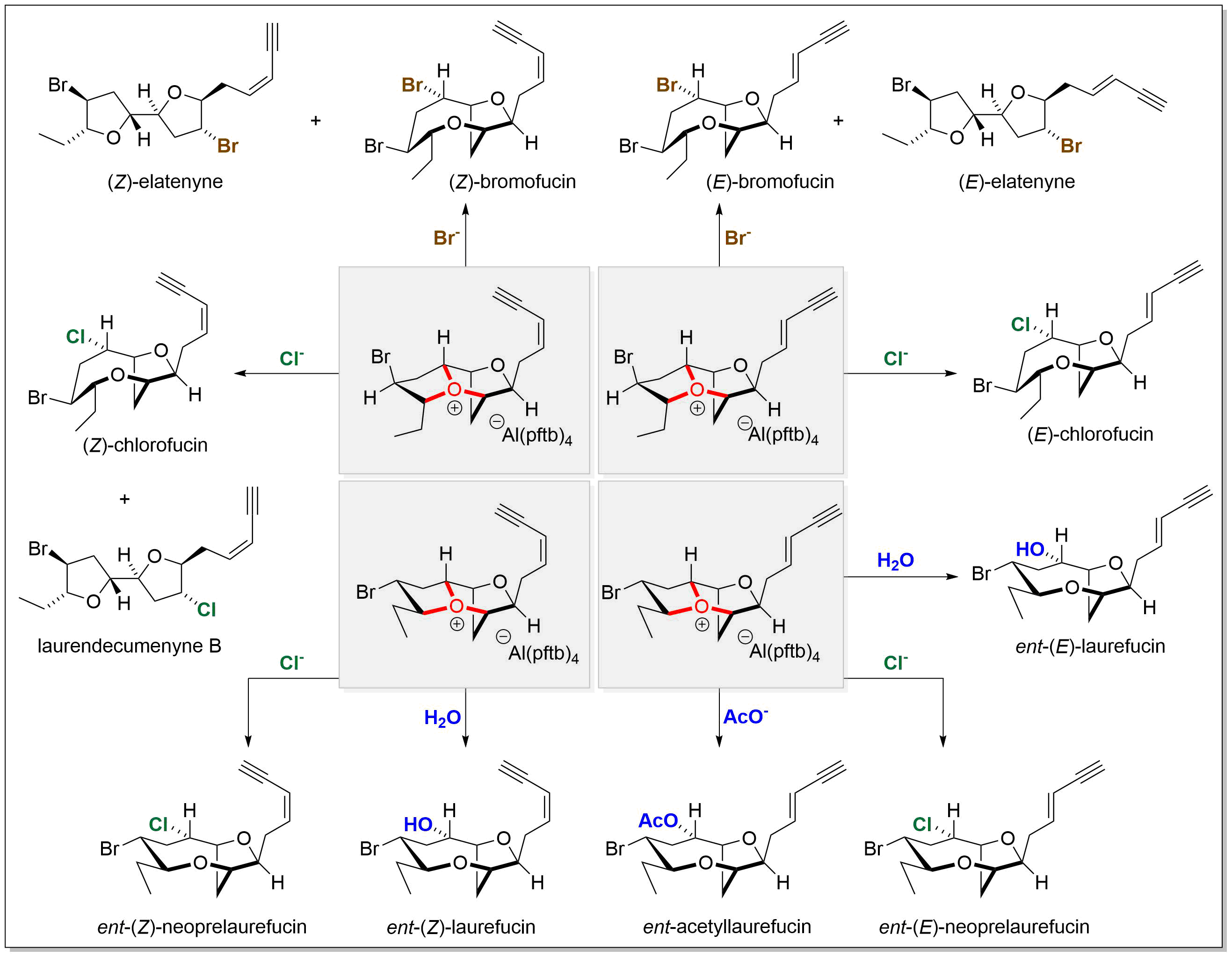

== See also ==
- Acylium ion, a type of oxonium ion with the structure R−C≡O^{+}
- Onium ion, a +1 cation derived by protonation of a hydride (includes oxonium ions)
- Pyrylium, a subtype of oxonium ion
- Sulfonium, a sulfur analog that can be chiral
