= DTU Roadrunners =

Danish sustainable transport project

(Denmark) DTU Roadrunners
- Founded: 2004

DTU Roadrunners is a student driven project at the Technical University of Denmark competing in the Shell Eco-marathon races. The team participates in one or both of the two classes at Shell Eco-Marathon Europe: the UrbanConcept class and the Prototype class with the cars Dynamo and Innovator respectively. The team consists of 20 to 30 students. Project work in the course is based on the CDIO-working form and students are thus responsible for the development, construction and operation of the vehicles.

== UrbanConcept ==
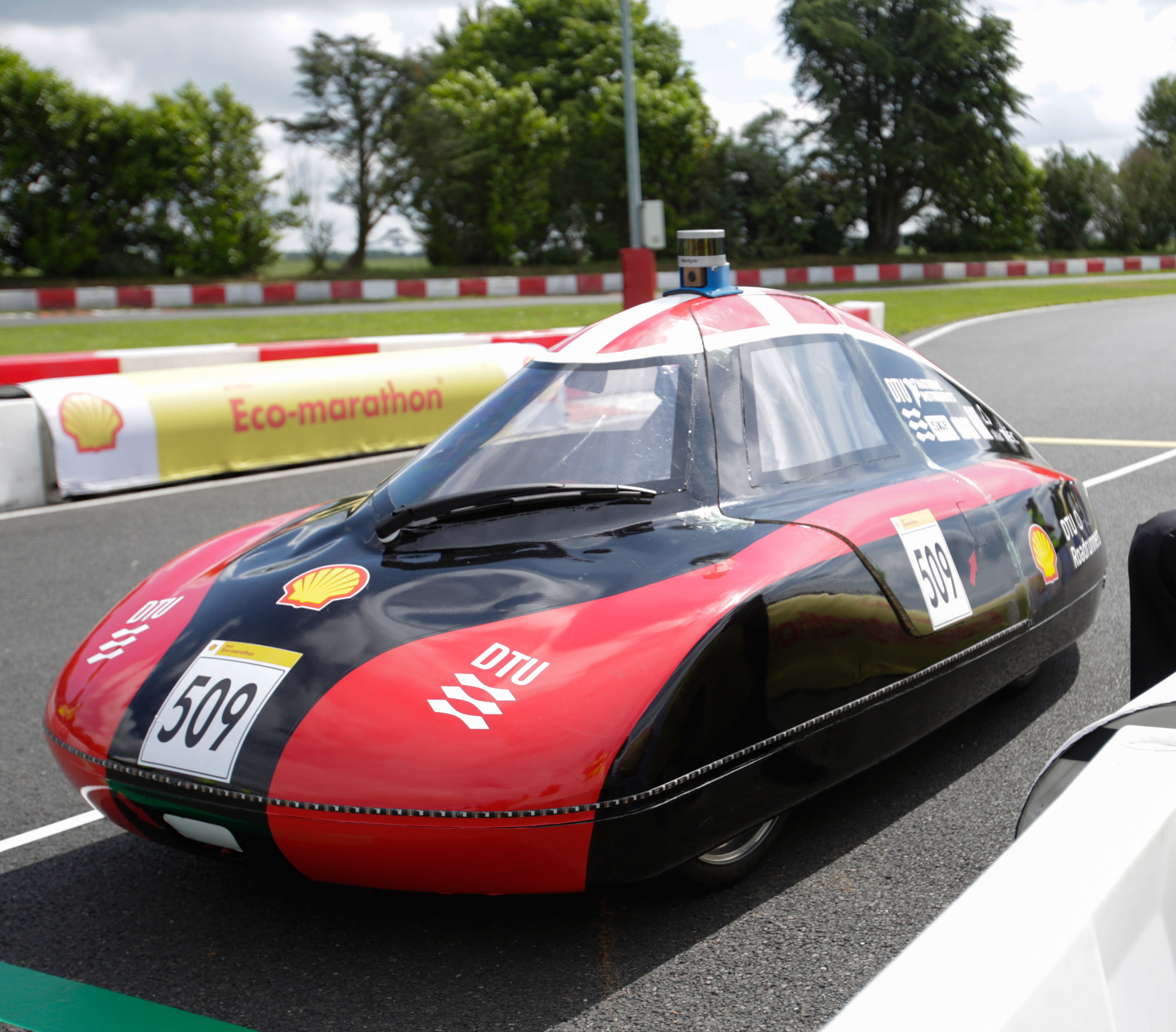
DTU Dynamo 14.0 at the Shell Eco-marathon France 2018

The UrbanConcept category in the Shell Eco-Marathon has the aim to create a very fuel-efficient car that looks similar to a small city car.

=== Results ===
Race Results for DTU Dynamo
Year	Car	Engine type	Fuel	km/L	Pos.	Track
2005	Dynamo 1.0	Fuel cell	Hydrogen	671	1	Circuit Paul Armagnac
2006	Dynamo 2.0	Fuel cell	Hydrogen	810	1	Circuit Paul Armagnac
2007	Dynamo 3.0	Internal combustion	DME	306	1	Circuit Paul Armagnac
2008	Dynamo 4.0	Internal combustion	DME	265	5	Circuit Paul Armagnac
2009	Dynamo 5.0	Internal combustion	DME	589	1	EuroSpeedway Lausitz
2010	Dynamo 6.0	Internal combustion	GTL	348	1	EuroSpeedway Lausitz
2011	Dynamo 7.0	Internal combustion	Ethanol	509	1	EuroSpeedway Lausitz
2012	Dynamo 8.0	Internal combustion	Ethanol	611.1	1	Ahoy! Street circuit, Rotterdam
2013	Dynamo 9.0	Internal combustion	Ethanol	612.3	1	Ahoy! Street circuit, Rotterdam
2014	Dynamo 10.0	Internal combustion	Ethanol	599	1	Ahoy! Street circuit, Rotterdam
2015	Dynamo 11.0/DTU Phoenix	Internal combustion	Ethanol	665	1	Ahoy! Street circuit, Rotterdam
2016	Dynamo 12.0	Internal combustion	Ethanol	DNF	-	Queen Elizabeth Olympic Park
2017	Dynamo 13.0	Internal combustion	Ethanol	449.2	2	Queen Elizabeth Olympic Park
2018	Dynamo 14.0	Internal combustion	Ethanol	374.2	1	Queen Elizabeth Olympic Park
2019	Dynamo 15.0	Internal combustion	Ethanol	429.4	1	Mercedes-Benz World
2022	Dynamo 16.0	Internal combustion	Ethanol	501.73	1	TT Circuit Assen
2023	Dynamo 17.0	Internal combustion	Ethanol	459.98	1	Circuit Paul Armagnac
2024	Dynamo 18.0	Internal combustion	Ethanol	414	1	Circuit Paul Armagnac
2025	Dynamo 19.0	Internal combustion	Ethanol	517.5	1	de:Silesia Ring

== Autonomous UrbanConcept ==
The Autonomous UrbanConcept challenge was launched in 2018 with multiple challenges for self-driving vehicles. DTU Dynamo became the first student-built car to complete a lap on the Shell Eco-Marathon track fully autonomously.

=== Results ===
Race Results for the Autonomous UrbanConcept
Year	Car	Pos.	Track
2018	Dynamo 14.0	1	Queen Elizabeth Olympic Park
2019	Dynamo 15.0	2	Circuit Park Berghem
2022	Dynamo 16.0	1	Circuit Paul Armagnac

== Prototype ==
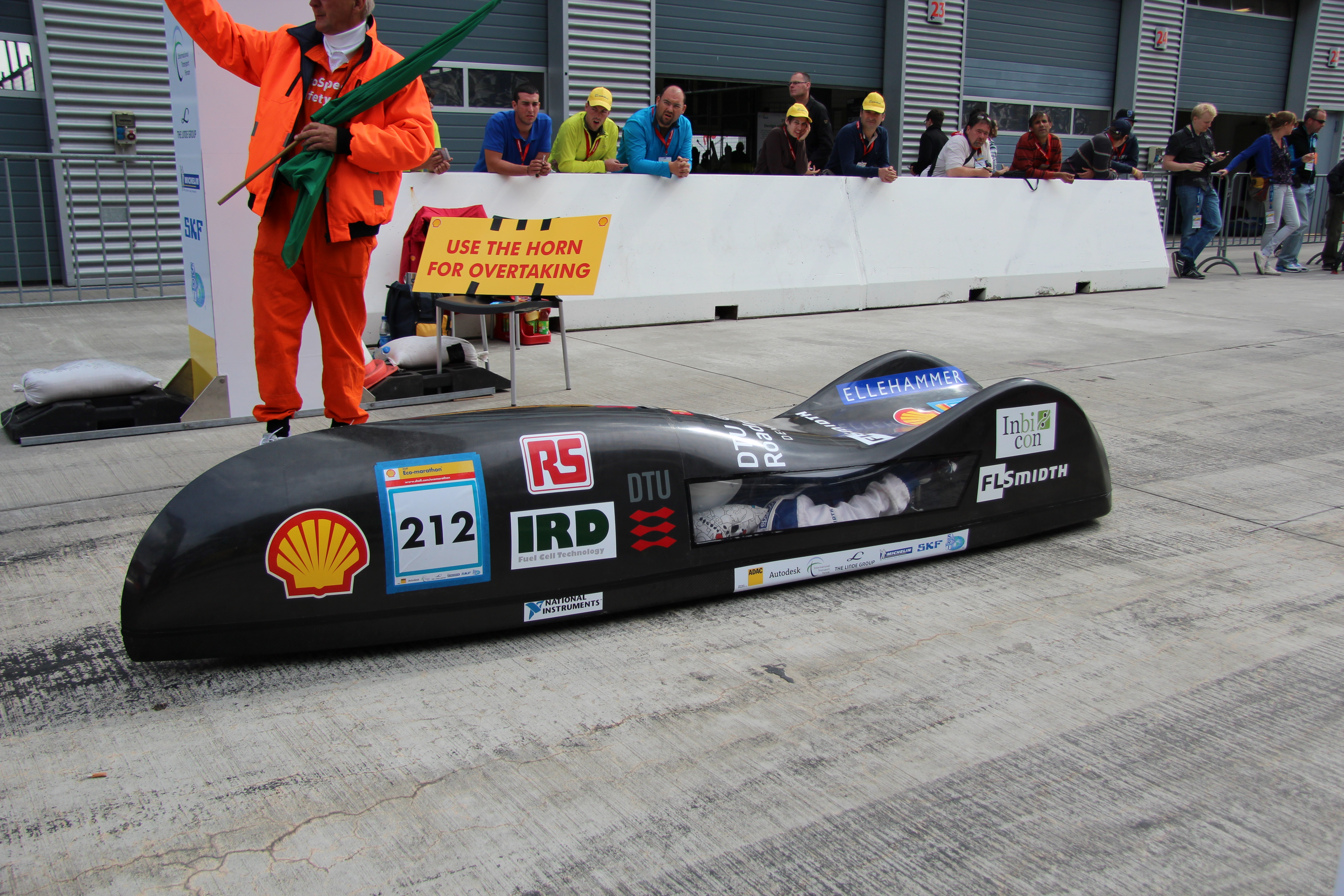
DTU Innovator at Shell Eco-Marathon 2011

=== Results ===
Race Results for DTU Innovator
Year	Car	Engine type	Fuel	km/L	Pos.	Track
2004	Spirit of Copenhagen	Internal combustion	DME	583	5	Circuit Paul Armagnac
2005	Innovator 1.0	Internal combustion	DME	-	-	Circuit Paul Armagnac
2006	Innovator 1.0	Internal combustion	DME	DNF	-	Circuit Paul Armagnac
	Spirit of Copenhagen	Internal combustion	DME	780		Rockingham Motor Speedway
2007	Innovator 2.0	Fuel cell	Hydrogen	1633	6	Circuit Paul Armagnac
2008	Innovator 3.0	Fuel cell	Hydrogen	2328	8	Circuit Paul Armagnac
2009	Innovator 4.0	Fuel cell	Hydrogen	3549	1	EuroSpeedway Lausitz
2010	Innovator 4.0	Fuel cell	Hydrogen	DNF	-	EuroSpeedway Lausitz
2011	Innovator 4.0	Fuel cell	Hydrogen	DNF	-	EuroSpeedway Lausitz
2016	Innovator 2016	Internal combustion	Gasoline	670	9	Queen Elizabeth Olympic Park
