= Oxatriquinacene =

Oxonium ion

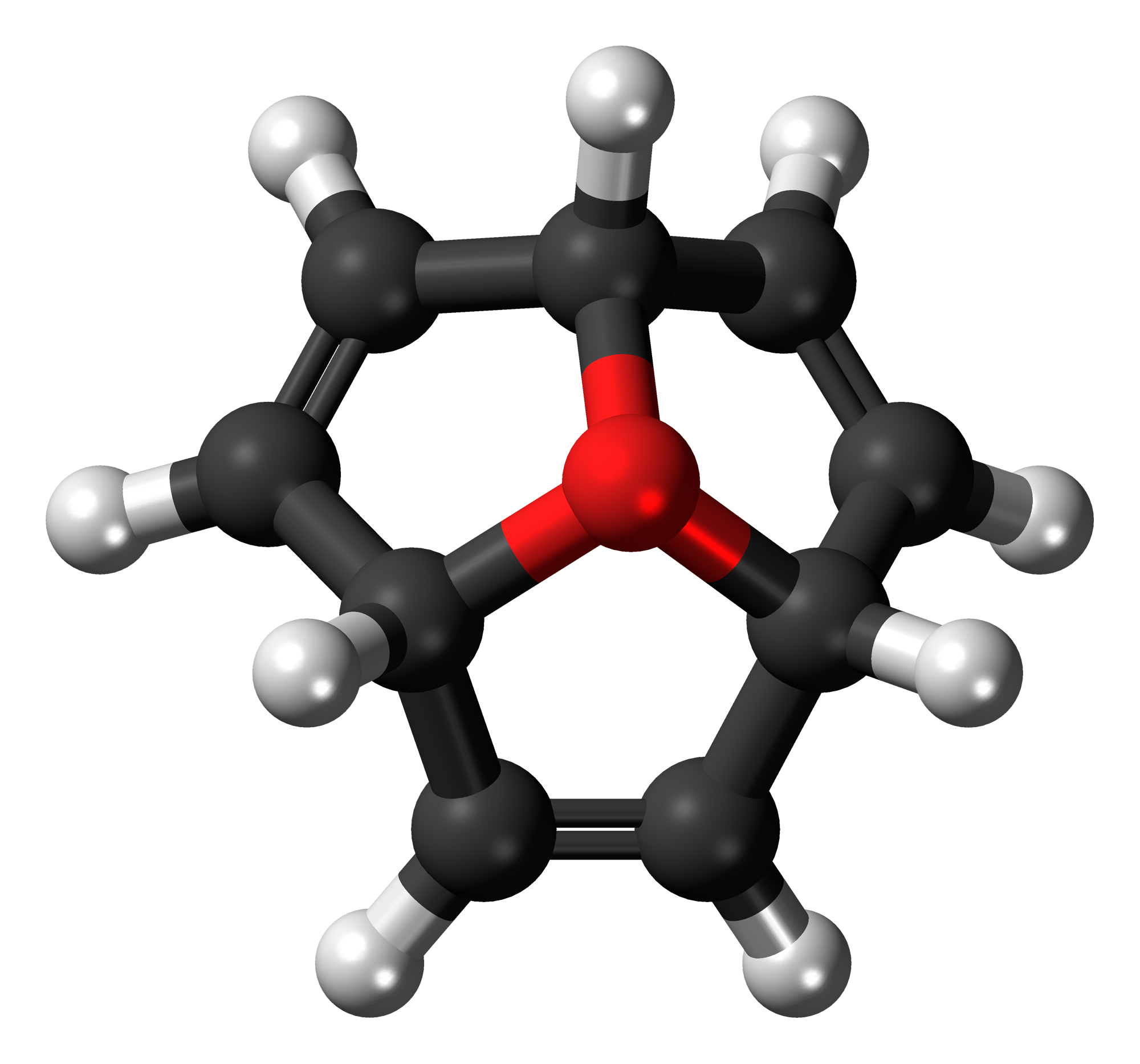

Names
- Preferred IUPAC name (2as,4as,6as)-4a,6a-Dihydro-2a^{1}λ^{4}-oxacyclopenta[cd]pentalen-2a^{1}(2aH)-ylium

Identifiers
| CAS Number | 1056450-16-8 |
| 3D model (JSmol) | Interactive image |
| ChemSpider | 32675183 |
| PubChem CID | 66553020 |
| CompTox Dashboard (EPA) | DTXSID001027148 |
- InChI: InChI=1S/C9H9O/c1-2-8-5-6-9-4-3-7(1)10(8)9/h1-9H/q+1/t7-,8+,9- Key: YQBOZXASCNTXGC-AYMMMOKOSA-N; InChI=1/C9H9O/c1-2-8-5-6-9-4-3-7(1)10(8)9/h1-9H/q+1/t7-,8+,9- Key: YQBOZXASCNTXGC-AYMMMOKOBA
- SMILES: C1=C[C@@H]2[O+]3[C@H]1C=C[C@@H]3C=C2

Properties
| Chemical formula | C_{9}H_{9}O |
| Molar mass | 133.167 |
- Except where otherwise noted, data are given for materials in their standard state (at 25 °C [77 °F], 100 kPa). Infobox references

Oxatriquinacene is an organic cation with formula C_{9}H_{9}O^{+}. It is an oxonium ion, with a tricoordinated oxygen atom with +1 charge connected to carbons 1,4, and 7 of a cyclononatriene ring, forming three fused pentagonal cycles. The compound may possess weak tris-homoaromatic character.

Oxatriquinacene has remarkable stability compared to other oxonium cations, although not as extreme as that of the similar oxatriquinane. It reacts with water, but can be dissolved in acetonitrile. It is of interest as a possible precursor to oxaacepentalene, a hypothetical neutral aromatic species.

Oxatriquinacene was obtained in 2008 by Mascal and coworkers, through a variant of the synthesis that led them to oxatriquinane.

== See also ==
- Triethyloxonium tetrafluoroborate
- Brookhart's acid
- Pyrylium salt
