= Oxonium =

Oxonium may refer to:

- Oxonium ion, any ion which contains a tricoordinated oxygen atom, RR'R"O^{+}
- Oxonium, an IUPAC name for the simplest oxonium ion, hydronium, H_{3}O^{+}
- Oxonium (often abbreviated to Oxon.), sometimes used in university circles as a Latin name for Oxford University in England
