= EU Project Renew =

Alternative fuel project

Renew was a European four-year project (2004–07) to prove different concepts of fuel production from biomass. Established and funded by the European Union's Sixth Framework Programme in January 2004, the Renew consortium consisted of 33 partners from 9 European countries. More than half of the partners were industrial enterprises, while the others were research and development institutes with the special expertise needed to perform the individual research and development tasks.

The project was divided into six sub-projects, four of which were dedicated to the optimisation and analysis of the fuel production process and production routes for biofuels from lignocellulosic feedstock, also known as second generation biofuel.

== Partners ==
=== Automotive industry ===
- Volkswagen, Wolfsburg, Germany
- Daimler Chrysler, Stuttgart, Germany
- Renault through REGIENOV, Boulogne Billancourt, France
- Volvo through VTEC, Gothenburg, Sweden

=== R&D institutes and universities ===
- AICIA (Asociacion de investigacion Y Cooperacion Industrial de Andalucia), Seville, Spain
- CERTH (National Centre for Research and Technology-Hellas), Thermi, Thessaloniki, Greece
- CRES (Center for Renewable Energy Sources), Pikermi, Greece
- CUTEC, Clausthal-Zellerfeld, Germany
- EEE (Europäisches Zentrum für Erneuerbare Energie), Güssing, Austria
- Lunds Universitet Dept. of Environmental and Energy System Studies, Lund, Sweden
- Forschungszentrum Karlsruhe Institut für technische Chemie, Karlsruhe, Germany
- IEE (Institute of Energy and Environment), Leipzig, Germany
- INiG (Instytut Nafty i Gazu), Kraków, Poland
- ITN (Instytut Technoligii Nafty; English: Institute of Petroleum Processing), Kraków, Poland
- PSI (Paul Scherrer Institute), Villingen, Switzerland
- TUV (Technische Universität Wien), Vienna, Austria
- ZSW (Center for Solar Energy and Hydrogen Research), Stuttgart, Germany

=== Fuel distribution ===
- BP, Bochum, Germany
- Total, Paris La Défense, France

=== Plant engineering and construction ===
- Chemrec, Stockholm, Sweden
- Repotec - Renewable Power Technologies Umwelttechnik, Güssing, Austria
- UET (Umwelt- und Energietechnik Freiberg), Freiberg, Germany

=== Plant operator ===
- Abengoa, Sevilla, Spain
- Biomasse-Kraftwerk Güssing, Güssing, Austria
- Södra Cell, Mörrum, Sweden

=== Agriculture and forestry biomass research ===
- EC BREC/CLN (EC Baltic Renewable Energy Centre), Warsaw, Poland
- STFI (now Innventia), Stockholm, Sweden
- National University of Ireland, Dublin, Ireland

=== Services ===
- B.A.U.M. Consult, Munich, Germany
- Ecotraffic, Stockholm, Sweden
- ESU-services, Uster, Switzerland
- SYNCOM F&E Beratung, Ganderkesee, Germany

=== Investors ===
- EDF (Electricité de France), Chatou, France

== Sub-projects ==
- Product optimization of BTL production
- Process optimization of BTL production
- Black liquor to DME/methanol
- Optimization of Bioethanol production
- Biofuel Assessment
- Training
