= Oxatriquinane =

Ion

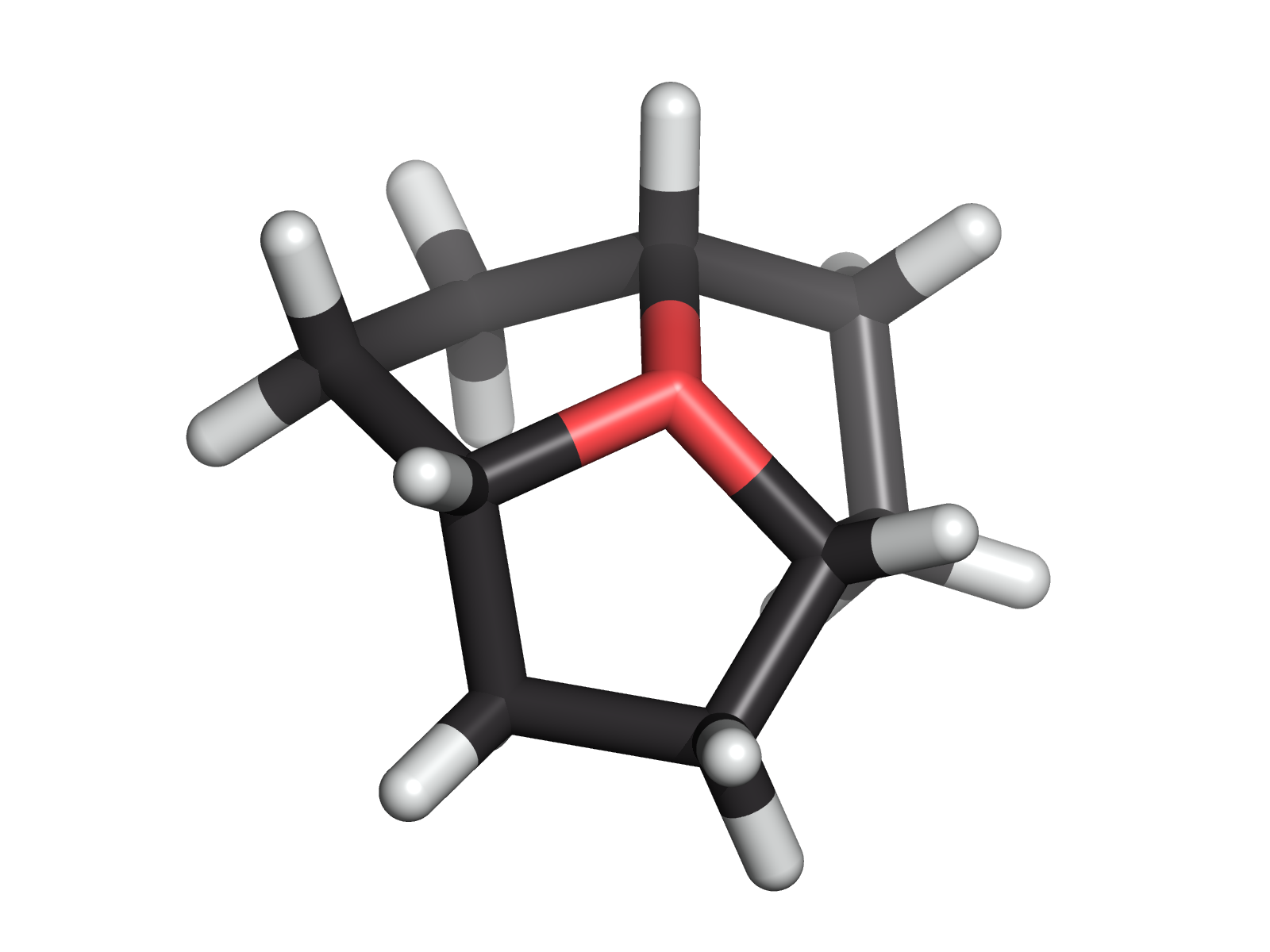

Names
- Preferred IUPAC name (2as,4as,6as)-Octahydro-2a^{1}λ^{4}-oxacyclopenta[cd]pentalene-2a^{1}(1H)-ylium

Identifiers
CAS Number	1056549-35-9
3D model (JSmol)	Interactive image
ChemSpider	21402960
PubChem CID	57459997
UNII	7H9V7B36FY
- InChI: InChI=1S/C9H15O/c1-2-8-5-6-9-4-3-7(1)10(8)9/h7-9H,1-6H2/q+1/t7-,8+,9- Key: BVKXDOLLNZJDKZ-AYMMMOKOSA-N; InChI=1/C9H15O/c1-2-8-5-6-9-4-3-7(1)10(8)9/h7-9H,1-6H2/q+1/t7-,8+,9- Key: BVKXDOLLNZJDKZ-AYMMMOKOBR
- SMILES: [H][C@@]12[O+]3[C@@](CC2)([H])CC[C@]3([H])CC1

Properties
Chemical formula	C_{9}H_{15}O
Molar mass	139.218 g·mol^{−1}
- Except where otherwise noted, data are given for materials in their standard state (at 25 °C [77 °F], 100 kPa). verify (what is ?) Infobox references

Oxatriquinane (oxoniaperhydrotriquinacene) is an alkyl oxonium ion with formula (CH_{2}CH_{2}CH)_{3}O^{+}. It has a cyclononane backbone, with a tricoordinated oxygen connected to carbon 1, 4, and 7, forming three fused pentagonal rings. In contrast to most trialkyloxonium ions, oxatriquinane hydrolyzes slowly.

== History ==
Oxatriquinane was first described in 2008. Its five-step synthesis starts from 1,4,7-cyclononatriene. Its C–O bond lengths are 1.54 Å. The C−O−C angles are acute.

== Reactions ==
Oxonium ions normally are strong alkylating agents and are hydrolytically sensitive. Oxatriquinane does not react with boiling water or with alcohols, thiols, halide ions, or amines, although it does react with stronger nucleophiles such as hydroxide, cyanide, and azide. The ability of the oxygen to enter into a fourth covalent bond has been of some theoretical interest and was achieved using carborane acid. As illustrated by the structures of most metal oxides, oxygen compounds routinely have bonds to >3 elements in other classes of compounds.

== Analogs ==
Related species include oxatriquinacene, the tri-unsaturated analog, which is of interest as a possible precursor to oxaacepentalene, a neutral aromatic species. 1,4,7-Tri-tert-butyloxatriquinane has also been synthesized. This compound contains significant amounts of intramolecular steric strain, resulting in further bond elongation to give C–O bond lengths of 1.622 Å, the longest recorded in any species.

Oxatriquinacene

Oxaacepentalene

== Notes ==
1. Triquinane is more often used in the natural product literature to refer to three angularly fused cyclopentane rings sharing a common quaternary carbon in the center, a structure which contains one more carbon atom at the periphery. Moreover, substitution by O^{+} is more properly designated by the prefix oxonia. Nevertheless, the authors who first prepared the cation called it oxatriquinane, and the name has been perpetuated in the literature. A semisystematic name in line with standard nomenclature would be 2a^{1}-oxonia-1,2,3,4,5,6-hexahydrotriquinacene.
