= Trimethyloxonium tetrafluoroborate =

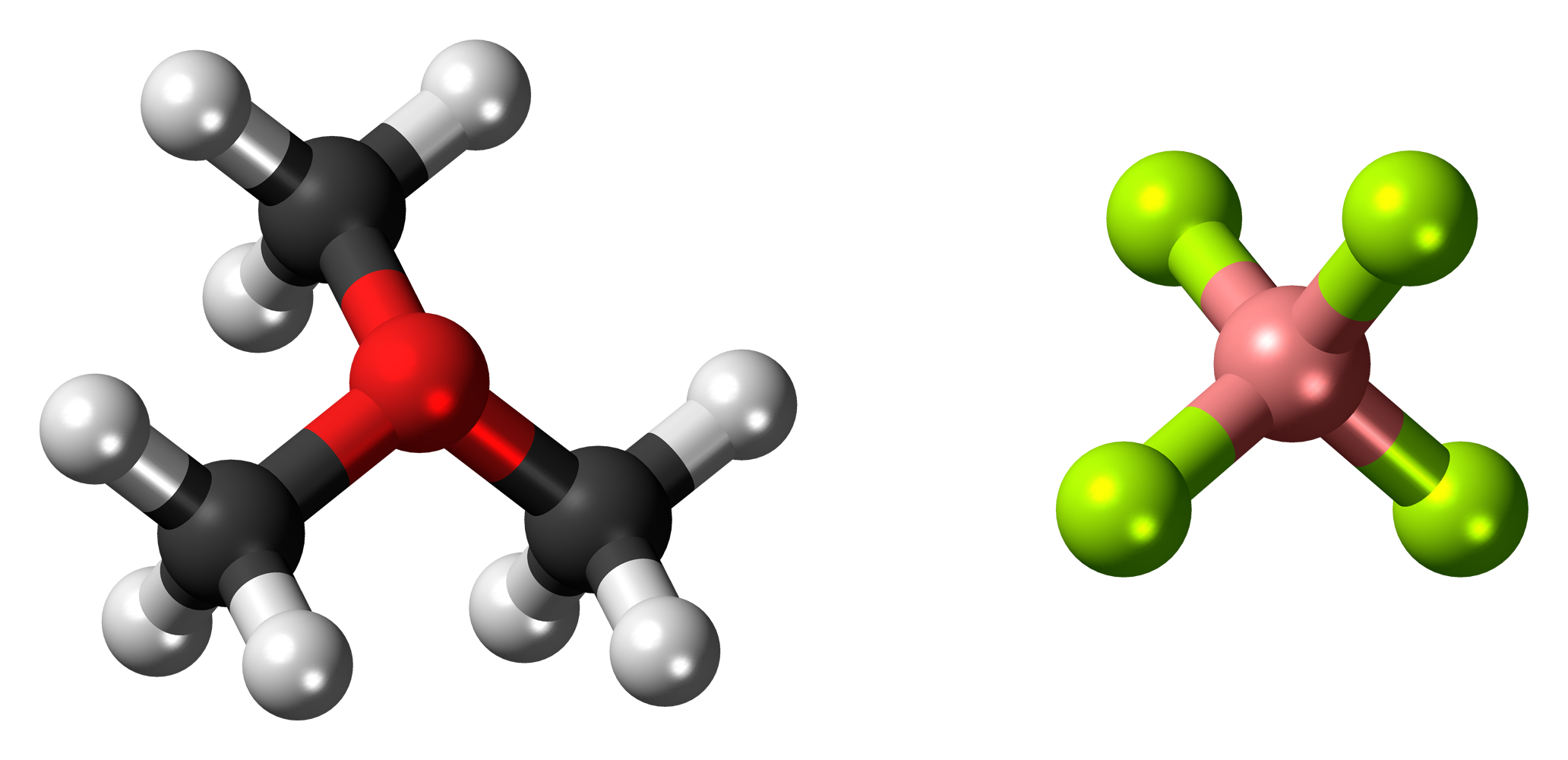

Names
- IUPAC name Trimethyloxonium tetrafluoroborate
- Other names Meerwein's salt Trimethyloxonium fluoroborate

Identifiers
CAS Number	420-37-1
3D model (JSmol)	Interactive image
ChemSpider	2016863
ECHA InfoCard	100.006.360
PubChem CID	2735153
UNII	BFC3NMU8S8
CompTox Dashboard (EPA)	DTXSID20883377
- InChI: InChI=1S/C3H9O.BF4/c1-4(2)3;2-1(3,4)5/h1-3H3;/q+1;-1 Key: CZVZBKHWOFJNCR-UHFFFAOYSA-N
- SMILES: F[B-](F)(F)F.[O+](C)(C)C

Properties
Chemical formula	[(CH_{3})_{3}O]^{+}[BF_{4}]^{−}
Molar mass	147.91 g·mol^{−1}
Appearance	White solid
Melting point	179.6–180 °C (355.3–356.0 °F; 452.8–453.1 K)
- Except where otherwise noted, data are given for materials in their standard state (at 25 °C [77 °F], 100 kPa). Infobox references

Trimethyloxonium tetrafluoroborate is the organic compound with the formula [(CH_{3})_{3}O]^{+}[BF_{4}]^{−}. (It is sometimes called "Meerwein's salt" after Hans Meerwein. (Note: Meerwein's salt classically referred to triethyloxonium tetrafluoroborate. However, in recent years, the trimethyloxonium salt has also been called Meerwein's salt.)) This salt is a strong methylating agent, being a synthetic equivalent of CH^{+}_{3}. It is a white solid that rapidly decomposes upon exposure to atmospheric moisture, although it is robust enough to be weighed quickly without inert atmosphere protection. Triethyloxonium tetrafluoroborate is a closely related compound.

== Preparation and reactions ==
The compound is prepared by the reaction of boron trifluoride with dimethyl ether and epichlorohydrin:

4 Me_{2}O·BF_{3} + 2 Me_{2}O + 3 C_{2}H_{3}OCH_{2}Cl → 3 [Me_{3}O]^{+}[BF_{4}]^{−} + B[(OCH(CH_{2}Cl)CH_{2}OMe]_{3}

The salt hydrolyzes readily:

[Me_{3}O]^{+}[BF_{4}]^{−} + H_{2}O → Me_{2}O + MeOH + H^{+}[BF_{4}]^{−}

Trimethyloxonium tetrafluoroborate is generally ranked as the strongest commercially available reagent for electrophilic methylation, being stronger than methyl sulfonate esters, including methyl triflate and methyl fluorosulfonate ("magic methyl"). Only the exotic dimethylhalonium reagents ([Me_{2}X]^{+}[SbF_{6}]^{−}, X = Cl, Br, I), methyl carboranate reagents, and the transiently generated methyldiazonium cation (MeN^{+}_{2}) are stronger sources of electrophilic methyl groups.

This compound is rapidly destroyed by atmospheric moisture and is best stored in an argon atmosphere at −20 °C. The degradation products of this reagent are corrosive, although are considerably less hazardous than methyl triflate or methyl fluorosulfonate, as they do not evaporate.

Trimethyloxonium tetrafluoroborate is useful for the methyl esterification of carboxylic acids under conditions where acid-catalyzed reactions cannot be used:

RCO_{2}H + (CH_{3})_{3}OBF_{4} → RCO_{2}CH_{3} + (CH_{3})_{2}O + H^{+}[BF_{4}]^{−}
