= Methyl trifluoromethanesulfonate =

- Structural formula of methyl triflate

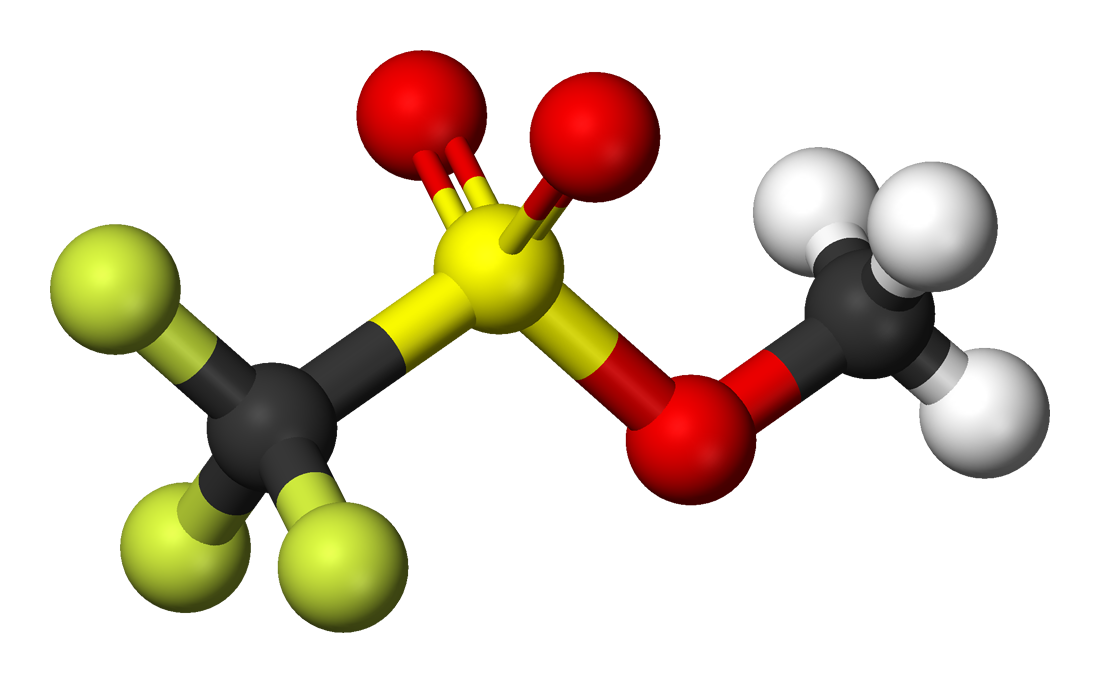
- Ball-and-stick model of methyl triflate

Names
- Preferred IUPAC name Methyl trifluoromethanesulfonate
- Other names Trifluoromethanesulfonic acid, methyl ester Triflic acid, methyl ester, methyl triflate

Identifiers
CAS Number	333-27-7
3D model (JSmol)	Interactive image
ChemSpider	9153
ECHA InfoCard	100.005.793
EC Number	206-371-7
PubChem CID	9526
UNII	7B25Z22EPV
UN number	2924
CompTox Dashboard (EPA)	DTXSID6049272
- InChI: InChI=1S/C2H3F3O3S/c1-8-9(6,7)2(3,4)5/h1H3 Key: OIRDBPQYVWXNSJ-UHFFFAOYSA-N; InChI=1/C2H3F3O3S/c1-8-9(6,7)2(3,4)5/h1H3 Key: OIRDBPQYVWXNSJ-UHFFFAOYAL
- SMILES: COS(=O)(=O)C(F)(F)F

Properties
Chemical formula	C_{2}H_{3}F_{3}O_{3}S
Molar mass	164.10 g·mol^{−1}
Appearance	Colourless Liquid
Density	1.496 g/mL
Melting point	−64 °C (−83 °F; 209 K)
Boiling point	100 °C (212 °F; 373 K)
Solubility in water	Hydrolyzes

Hazards
- Occupational safety and health (OHS/OSH)
Main hazards	reactive and toxic substance
- GHS labelling
Pictograms	(GHS02: Flammable) (GHS05: Corrosive) (GHS06: Toxic)
Signal word	Danger
Hazard statements	H226, H301, H311, H314, H330
Precautionary statements	P210, P233, P303+P361+P353, P304+P340+P310, P305+P351+P338, P380
Flash point	38 °C (100 °F; 311 K)

Related compounds
Related compounds	Methyl fluorosulfonate
- Except where otherwise noted, data are given for materials in their standard state (at 25 °C [77 °F], 100 kPa). verify (what is ?) Infobox references

Methyl trifluoromethanesulfonate, also commonly called methyl triflate and abbreviated MeOTf, is the organic compound with the formula CF_{3}SO_{2}OCH_{3}. It is a colourless liquid which finds use in organic chemistry as a powerful methylating agent. The compound is closely related to methyl fluorosulfonate (FSO_{2}OCH_{3}). Although there has yet to be a reported human fatality, several cases were reported for methyl fluorosulfonate (LC_{50} (rat, 1 h) = 5 ppm), and methyl triflate is expected to have similar toxicity based on available evidence.

== Synthesis ==
Methyl triflate is commercially available, however it may also be prepared in the laboratory by using dimethyl sulfate to methylate triflic acid.

CF_{3}SO_{2}OH + (CH_{3}O)_{2}SO_{2} → CF_{3}SO_{2}OCH_{3} + CH_{3}OSO_{2}OH

== Reactivity ==
=== Hydrolysis ===
Upon contact with water, methyl triflate loses its methyl group, forming triflic acid and methanol:

CF_{3}SO_{2}OCH_{3} + H_{2}O → CF_{3}SO_{2}OH + CH_{3}OH

=== Methylation ===
One ranking of methylating agents is (CH_{3})_{3}O^{+} > CF_{3}SO_{2}OCH_{3} ≈ FSO_{2}OCH_{3} > (CH_{3})_{2}SO_{4} > CH_{3}I. Methyl triflate will alkylate many functional groups which are very poor nucleophiles such as aldehydes, amides, and nitriles. It does not methylate benzene or the bulky 2,6-di-tert-butylpyridine. Its ability to methylate N-heterocycles is exploited in certain deprotection schemes.

=== Cationic polymerization ===
Methyl triflate initiates the living cationic polymerization of lactide and other lactones including β-propiolactone, ε-caprolactone and glycolide.

Polymerization of ε-caprolactone initiated by methyl triflate

Cyclic carbonates like trimethylene carbonate and neopentylene carbonate (5,5-dimethyl-1,3-dioxan-2-one) can be polymerized to the corresponding polycarbonates. 2-alkyl-2-oxazolines, for example 2-ethyl-2-oxazoline, are also polymerized to poly(2-alkyloxazoline)s.

== Applications ==
=== Radiochemistry ===
Carbon-11 methyl triflate ([11C]MeOTf), or methyl triflate containing the carbon-11 isotope, is commonly used in radiochemistry to synthesize radioactively labeled compounds that can be traced in living organisms using positron emission tomography (PET). For example, [11C]MeOTf has been used extensively in the production of Pittsburgh Compound B, which first allowed β-amyloid plaques to be imaged in a living brain.

== See also ==
- Triflate
- Magic methyl
