= Triethyloxonium tetrafluoroborate =

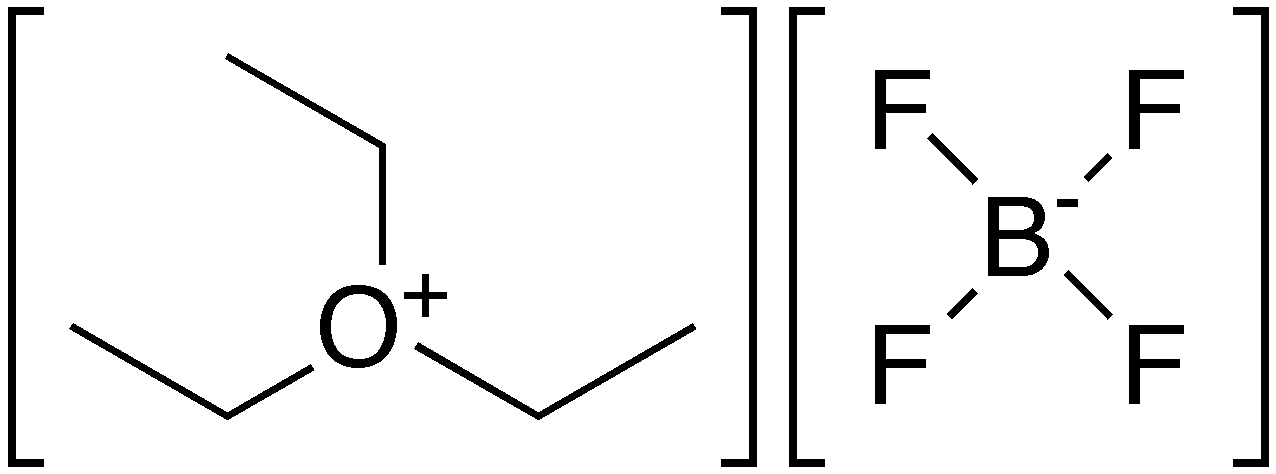

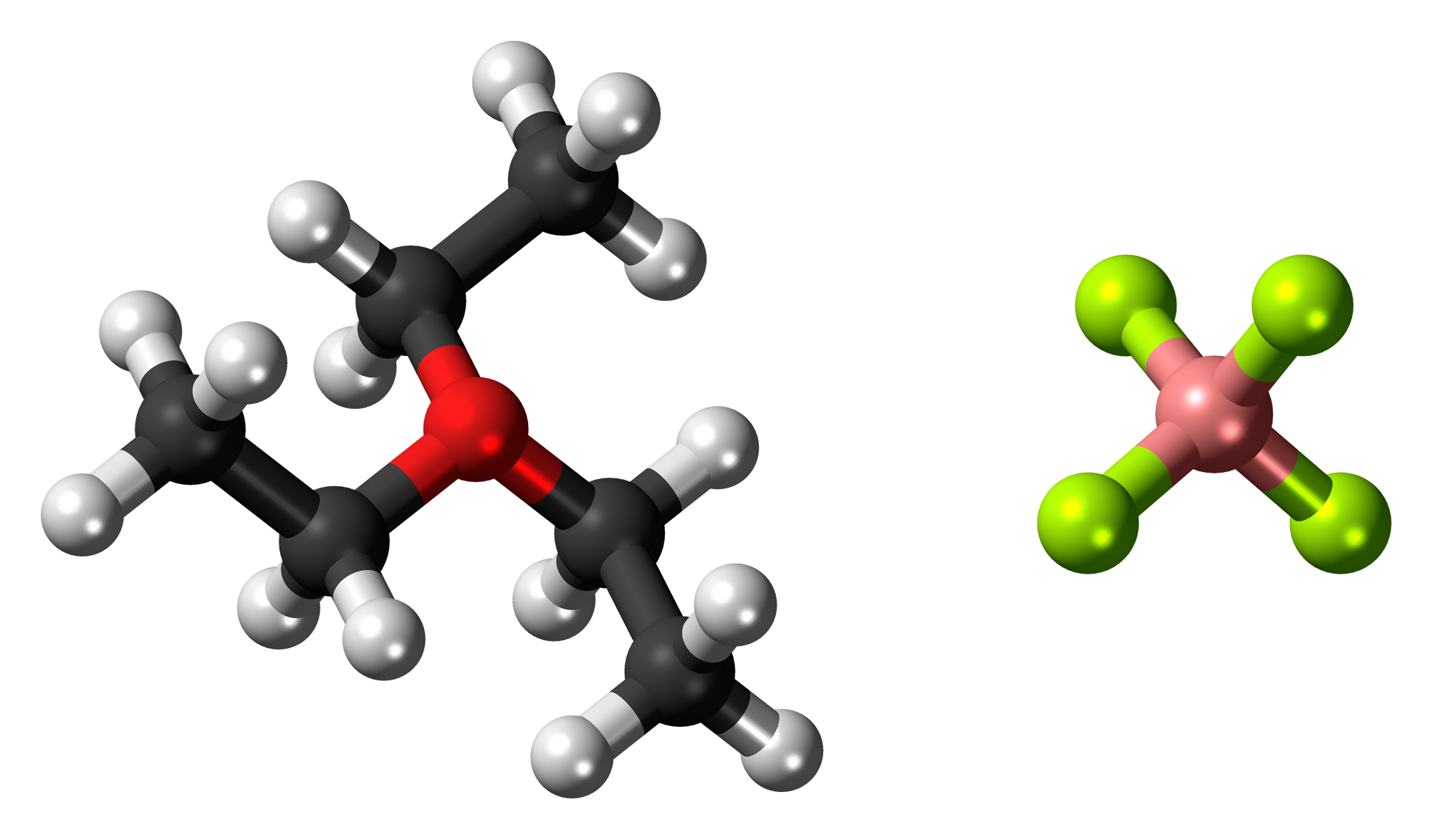

Names
- IUPAC name Triethyloxonium tetrafluoroborate

Identifiers
CAS Number	368-39-8
3D model (JSmol)	Interactive image
Beilstein Reference	3598090
ChemSpider	2006158
ECHA InfoCard	100.006.096
PubChem CID	2723982
UNII	Z0B19DD36J
UN number	3261
CompTox Dashboard (EPA)	DTXSID20883372
- InChI: InChI=1S/C6H15O.BF4/c1-4-7(5-2)6-3;2-1(3,4)5/h4-6H2,1-3H3;/q+1;-1 Key: IYDQMLLDOVRSJJ-UHFFFAOYSA-N
- SMILES: F[B-](F)(F)F.CC[O+](CC)CC

Properties
Chemical formula	[(CH_{3}CH_{2})_{3}O]^{+}[BF_{4}]^{−}
Molar mass	189.99 g·mol^{−1}
Melting point	91 to 92 °C (196 to 198 °F; 364 to 365 K)
Solubility in water	Reacts

Hazards
- GHS labelling
Pictograms	(GHS05: Corrosive)
Signal word	Danger
Hazard statements	H314
Precautionary statements	P260, P280, P303+P361+P353, P304+P340+P310, P305+P351+P338, P310, P363
- Except where otherwise noted, data are given for materials in their standard state (at 25 °C [77 °F], 100 kPa). verify (what is ?) Infobox references

Triethyloxonium tetrafluoroborate is the organic oxonium compound with the formula [(CH_{3}CH_{2})_{3}O]^{+}[BF_{4}]^{−}. It is often called Meerwein's reagent or Meerwein's salt after its discoverer Hans Meerwein. Also well known and commercially available is the related trimethyloxonium tetrafluoroborate. The compounds are white solids that dissolve in polar organic solvents. They are strong alkylating agents. Aside from the BF^{−}_{4} salt, many related derivatives are available.

== Synthesis and reactivity ==
Triethyloxonium tetrafluoroborate is prepared from boron trifluoride, diethyl ether, and epichlorohydrin:

4 Et_{2}O·BF_{3} + 2 Et_{2}O + 3 C_{2}H_{3}OCH_{2}Cl → 3 [Et_{3}O]^{+}[BF_{4}]^{−} + B(OCH(CH_{2}Cl)CH_{2}OEt)_{3}

where the Et stands for ethyl. The trimethyloxonium salt is available from dimethyl ether via an analogous route. These salts do not have long shelf-lives at room temperature. They degrade by hydrolysis:

[Et_{3}O]^{+}[BF_{4}]^{−} + H_{2}O → Et_{2}O + EtOH + H^{+}[BF_{4}]^{−}

The propensity of trialkyloxonium salts for alkyl-exchange can be advantageous. For example, trimethyloxonium tetrafluoroborate, which reacts sluggishly due to its low solubility in most compatible solvents, may be converted in situ to higher alkyl/more soluble oxoniums, thereby accelerating alkylation reactions.

This reagent is useful for esterification of carboxylic acids under conditions where acid-catalyzed reactions are infeasible:

RCO_{2}H + (C_{2}H_{5})_{3}OBF_{4} → RCO_{2}C_{2}H_{5} + (C_{2}H_{5})_{2}O + HBF_{4}

== Structure ==
The structure of triethyloxonium tetrafluoroborate has not been characterized by X-ray crystallography, but the structure of triethyloxonium hexafluorophosphate has been examined. The measurements confirm that the cation is pyramidal with C–O–C angles in the range 109.4°–115.5°. The average C–O distance is 1.49 Å.

== Safety ==
Triethyloxonium tetrafluoroborate is a very strong alkylating agent, although the hazards are diminished because it is non-volatile. It releases strong acid upon contact with water. The properties of the methyl derivative are similar.
