= Chemrec =

Swedish company that developed black liquor gasification (BLG) technology

Chemrec AB
- Type: Privately held company
- Industry: Black liquor gasification and biofuels
- Genre: Cleantech
- Founded: 1989
- Headquarters: Stockholm, Sweden
- Number of locations: 1
- Key people: Jonas Rudberg (Board member)
- Number of employees: 1

Chemrec AB (Chemrec) English: /ˈkɛmrɛk/ is a Stockholm, Sweden-based company that has worked on the development of black liquor gasification (BLG) technology for energy and chemicals recovery at pulp mills.

The company's process for gasification of black liquor from the chemical pulp industry is claimed to increase the yield of high-value energy products from 15 to 16% in modern recovery boilers to 22–23% for the BLG electricity concept (BLGCC) or to 55% for the BLG bio fuel concept (BLGMF), with 90+% green-house gas reduction. Low-cost, low-grade and abundant biomass energy then needs to be brought to the mill for a feed-stock swap to replace the gasified black liquor as feed-stock for production of steam and electricity in a biomass boiler, resulting in a total yield from added biomass to bio fuels of 70% for the BLGMF concept.

== Ownership history ==
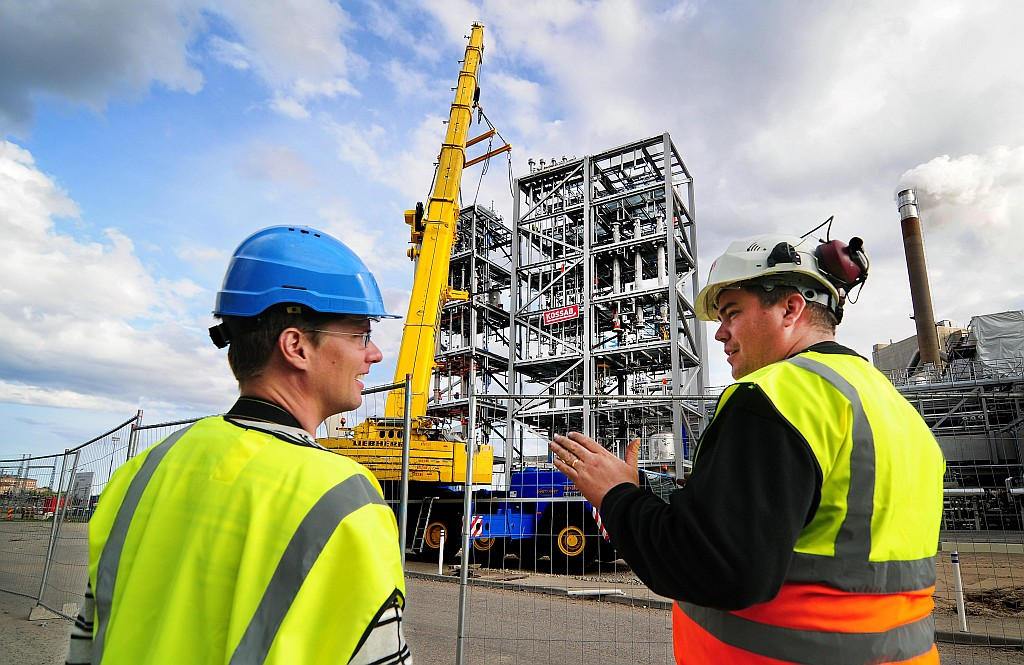
Installation of the BioDME synthesis towers at Chemrec's pilot facility in Piteå, Sweden, on May 23, 2010

Chemrec's technology originated in the mid-1980s with an invention by Jan-Erik Kignell who was awarded the Royal Swedish Academy of Engineering Sciences' Gold Medal for this feat in 1993. Kignell sold his black liquor gasification patent to the Swedish rolling bearing company SKF, which steel division worked on gasification in the late 1980s, but concluded that the technology related to black liquor was too far removed from the company's core business, upon which other inventors Nils Bernhard and Lars Stigsson acquired the patents in 1989 and founded Chemrec (an abbreviation of "chemical recovery") to exploit the technology.

In 1990 Kvaerner (Norwegian engineering and construction services company) bought Chemrec and remained the sole owner until 2000. When Kvaerner experienced financial difficulties and divested several non-core businesses in 2000 Babcock Borsig (German industrial equipment manufacturing group) acquired a majority position in Chemrec. Babcock Borsig filed for bankruptcy in 2002 and Nykomb Synergetics (Swedish energy and chemical industry development and operating company) at the time a minority owner, acquired Chemrec from the bankruptcy estate. In 2003–2006 Nykomb Synergetics was the sole owner of Chemrec.

Between 2006 and 2013 Chemrec succeeded in attracting a total of approx. USD 45 M capital contributions by means of rights issues reserved to the following Venture Capital companies:

- Vantage Point Venture Partners LP, San Bruno, California, USA (2006–2010)
- Volvo Technology Transfer AB, Göteborg, Sweden (2006–2013)
- Environmental Technologies Fund LP, London, UK (2008–2013)

== Technology development ==
During the period from 1988, Chemrec developed two pilot plants for first-generation atmospheric air-blown BLG gasifiers, first 1988–1989 with 3 tds/d (ton black liquor solids per day) capacity at SKF, Hofors, Sweden, then 1990–1994 with 75 tds/d capacity at AssiDomän, Frövi, Sweden, and followed by scale-up to the first commercial demo-plant, with this technology and 330 tds/d capacity which started up in 1996 at Weyerhaeuser's New Bern, North Carolina, US, pulp mill and operated 48,000 hours. Funding for the New Bern plant was arranged by Weyerhaeuser in collaboration with Chemrec and the U.S. DOE Energy Efficiency and Renewable Energy division.

Concurrently Chemrec initiated development of its second-generation pressurized BLG technology in a 15-bar pressurized pilot plant at StoraEnso, Skoghall, Sweden, which from 1993 operated air-blown with 6 tds/d capacity and after rebuild in 1996 operated until 2000 as oxygen-blown with 10 tds/d capacity.

Thereafter a new 30-bar 20 tds/d development plant (DP-1) at Smurfit Kappa, Piteå, Sweden, started-up in 2005 and logged 28,000 hours gasifier operation whereof 12,000 hours with syngas-fed methanol and DME synthesis operation.

Within the "BioDME" project, supported by the European Commission's Seventh Framework Programme (FP7), the Swedish Energy Agency, an industry consortium including Swedish pulp & paper companies, Danish Haldor Topsoe, specialist in production of heterogeneous catalysts and the design of process plants based on catalytic processes, Swedish truck manufacturer Volvo AB, Chemrec built the world's first pilot plant for synthesis of BioMethanol and BioDME adjacent to the DP-1 gasification development plant in Piteå, with production start in 2010 for operation on syngas from the Chemrec plant.

In 2013 the Piteå plant was transferred to Luleå University of Technology (LTU) and continued operation until it was mothballed in 2016, waiting for next project funding to be completed.

The Domsjö Biofuel project was during the period 2009-2012 developed by Chemrec in close co-operation with Domsjö Fabriker in Örnsköldsvik, Sweden with the objective of building a new BLG based energy and chemical recovery plant on the site

In 2009 the Swedish Energy Agency awarded Chemrec a grant of SEK 500 million (approx. €55M as at January 2011) towards the construction of a SEK 3.2 billion (approx. €350M) industrial scale commercial demonstration Chemrec gasification and biofuels plant at the Domsjö Fabriker biorefinery complex in Örnsköldsvik, Sweden. The grant was approved by EU's Directorate-General for Competition in January, 2011, following assessment of the project under the EU framework for State aid for research and development and innovation. This represented the largest public award so far to an EU second generation biofuels project.

After having secured €200M, more than half of €350M total project funding, including the €55M grant and €145M pledged by mill owner, EPC contractor and Int. Oil & Gas major, debt financing of the remaining €150M was prevented mainly due to lenders assessment of political risk.

Summary: In 2012 Lack of stable regulatory framework stopped the project!

-Recent Chemrec pressurized and oxygen-blown BLG technology developments further increasing fuel yield include addition of pyrolysis oil to the BL feed and addition of renewable hydrogen to green CO_{2} from the syngas cleaning process. -The planned next development step is scale up of the pressurized and oxygen blown BLG version to 550 tds/d for implementation of a commercial demonstration plant.

=== Black liquor properties ===
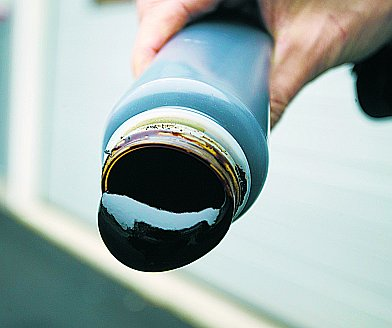
Black liquor sample

Black liquor is a biomass feedstock with unique properties.

First of all, it is available at existing industrial sites in large quantities.

Secondly it is a liquid. This makes it possible to easily feed it by pumping into the pressurized gasifier. With biomass in solid or pulverized form this becomes significantly more difficult. The liquid state also makes the black liquor easy to atomize into a fine mist that reacts very quickly in the gasifier.

Thirdly, the gasification of black liquor char is more rapid than for any other feedstock as the inherently high sodium and potassium content of black liquor acts as a catalyst.

These properties makes it possible to apply the high temperature, entrained flow gasification principle to black liquor. This type of gasification process provides many advantages over alternative gasification technologies:

- It is a very rapid, single-stage gasification process with low reactor volume
- It minimizes the need for raw syngas clean-up as the Chemrec process directly provides a raw syngas of excellent quality with
1. Complete carbon conversion
2. No tar formation
3. Low methane content

For all practical purposes sodium-based sulfite liquor, the sulfite process equivalent of black liquor, is equally or even better suited for gasification.

=== Investment cost and energy efficiency ===
Black liquor gasification fulfills two investment-intensive duties with a single process; it provides the pulp mill with needed black liquor recovery capacity at the same time as it produces syngas for biofuels production. In this way the total investment demand decreases.

The Chemrec gasification process had a substantially higher thermal efficiency than the process it replaces - the Tomlinson recovery boiler.

The location within a pulp mill complex provided benefits. First, environmental permitting was generally easier than for a greenfield industrial activity. Secondly, the pulp mill infrastructure for raw material supply, utilities and energy reuse further reduced investment and provided the opportunity for net energy cost reduction.

Chemrec's BLG technology producing syngas as feed-stock for second generation biofuels synthesis has in the European Community's Sixth Framework Programme project Renew been shown to yield lower production cost than any other studied technology. EUCAR / Concawe / JRC's Well-to-Wheels analysis of future automotive fuels and powertrains in the European context shows that methanol and DME produced via black liquor gasification has extremely high well-to-wheels efficiency and very high greenhouse gas reduction.

== Licensing ==
Chemrec AB is currently an Intellectual Property (IP) Holding Company offering an EPC/EPCM company the required license to practice the Chemrec BLG Technology.

The following Chemrec BLG units are examples from the wide range of possible tailor-made installations:

A300 Booster

The 300 tons/day atmospheric air-blown unit increases pulp production through improved black liquor recovery capacity and flexibility in chemical recovery. The A300 Booster is installed in parallel with the mill's existing recovery boiler. A significant benefit of this system is that it can be installed while the recovery boiler continues to operate, thus avoiding down time and lost production.

OX300 Booster

The OX300 atmospheric oxygen-blown Booster not only increases the black liquor recovery capacity but also produces a fuel gas suitable as lime kiln fuel. In this way lime kiln fuel costs and the mill carbon footprint can be significantly reduced.

P500 Expansion Unit

The 500 tons/day pressurized oxygen-blown unit offers mills additional capacity and increased yield, while producing significant volumes of sustainable, low-carbon biofuels.

P2000 Replacement Unit

The 2000 tons/day pressurized oxygen-blown unit replaces recovery boilers entirely, granting improved pulp yield, while producing significant volumes of sustainable, low-carbon biofuels.

P2000 Combined Cycle Unit

The 2000 tons/day pressurized unit oxygen-blown replaces recovery boilers entirely, granting improved pulp yield, while doubling “green power” production.

== See also ==
- Black liquor
- Gasification
- Second generation biofuels
- Kraft process
- Sulfite process
