= Black liquor =

Industrial by-product

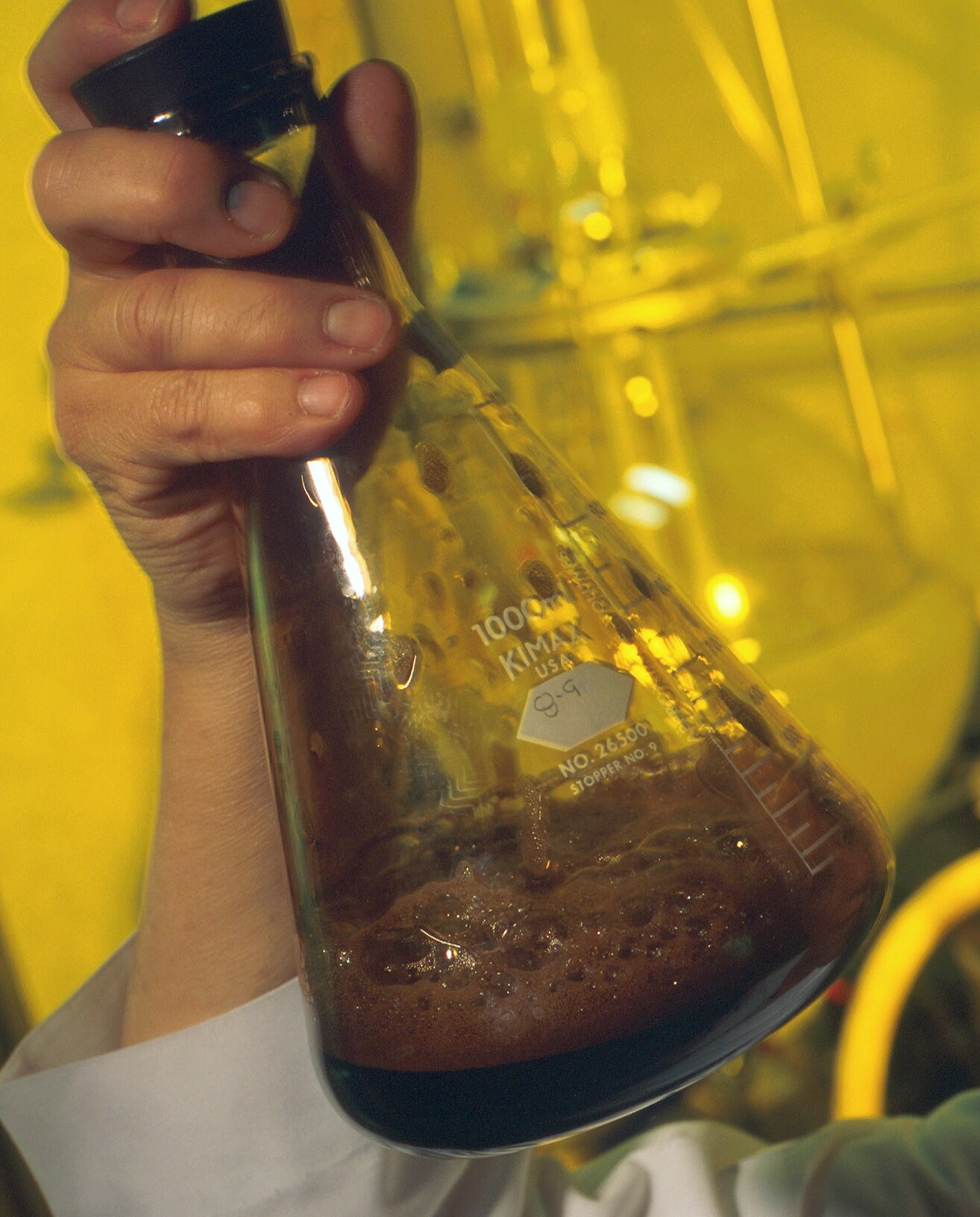
A black liquor sample

In industrial chemistry, black liquor is the by-product from the kraft process when digesting pulpwood into paper pulp removing lignin, hemicelluloses and other extractives from the wood to free the cellulose fibers.

The equivalent material in the sulfite process is usually called brown liquor, but the terms red liquor, thick liquor and sulfite liquor are also used.

== Composition ==
Approximately seven tonnes of black liquor are produced in the manufacture of one tonne of pulp.

The black liquor is an aqueous suspension of lignin residues, hemicellulose, and the inorganic chemicals used in the process. The black liquor comprises 15% solids by weight of which two thirds are organic chemicals and the remainder are inorganic. Normally the organics in black liquor are 40–45% soaps, 35–45% lignin and 10–15% other organics.

The organic matter in the black liquor is made up of water/alkali soluble degradation components from the wood. Lignin is degraded to shorter fragments with sulphur content at 1–2% and sodium content at about 6% of the dry solids. The extractives gives tall oil soap and crude turpentine.

The residual lignin components currently serve for hydrolytic or pyrolytic conversion or just burning only. Fresh black liquor is highly alkaline and highly reducing (reactive toward air). Some of the detailed properties are affected by the identity of the source trees, e.g. softwood vs hardwoods. In view of these properties, release of black liquor poses an environmental threat.

== History ==
Early kraft pulp mills discharged black liquor to watercourses. Black liquor is quite toxic to aquatic life, and causes a very dark caramel color in the water. The invention of the recovery boiler by G.H. Tomlinson in the early 1930s was a milestone in the advancement of the kraft process.

By the 1990s, most kraft mills were consuming nearly all of their black liquor byproduct, and purifying the remainder in biological treatment plants, reducing the environmental effect of the waste waters below the level of scientific significance, except perhaps in very small streams. Even in the 21st century, some small kraft mills remained (producing at most a few tons of pulp per day) that discharged all black liquor. However, these are rapidly disappearing. Some kraft mills, particularly in North America, still recovered under 98% of the black liquor in 2007, which can cause some environmental contamination, even when biologically treated. The general trend is for such obsolete mills to modernize or shut down.

In August 2011, a fish and mollusk kill occurred on the Pearl River when a neighboring Louisiana paper mill accidentally discharged black liquor due to a problem in its waste water treatment system.

== Usage ==
The black liquor contains more than half of the energy content of the wood fed into the digester of a kraft pulp mill. It is normally concentrated to 65–80% by multi-effect evaporators and burned in a recovery boiler to produce energy and recover the cooking chemicals. The viscosity increases as the concentration goes up. At about 50–55% solids the salt solubility limit is reached. Tall oil is an important byproduct separated from the black liquor with skimming before it goes to the evaporators or after the first evaporator stage.

=== Energy source for the pulp mill ===
Pulp mills have used black liquor as an energy source since at least the 1930s. Most kraft pulp mills use recovery boilers to recover and burn much of the black liquor they produce, generating steam and recovering the cooking chemicals (sodium hydroxide and sodium sulfide used to separate lignin from the cellulose fibres needed for papermaking). This has helped paper mills reduce problems with water emissions, reduce their use of chemicals by recovery and reuse, and become nearly energy self-sufficient by producing, on average, 66 percent of their own electricity needs on-site.

In the United States, paper companies have consumed nearly all of the black liquor they produce since the 1990s. As a result, the forest products industry has become one of the United States' leading generators of carbon-neutral renewable energy, producing approximately 28.5 terawatt hours of electricity annually.

=== Use as biofuel feedstock ===
==== Gasification ====
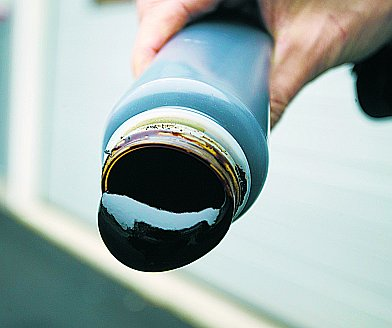
Black liquor as used for gasification

New waste-to-energy methods to recover and utilize the energy in the black liquor have been developed. The use of black liquor gasification has the potential to achieve higher overall energy efficiency than the conventional recovery boiler, while generating an energy-rich syngas from the liquor. The syngas can be burnt in a gas turbine combined cycle to produce electricity (usually called BLGCC for Black Liquor Gasification Combined Cycle; similar to IGCC) or converted through catalytic processes into chemicals or fuels such as methanol, dimethyl ether (DME), or F-T diesel (usually called BLGMF for Black Liquor Gasification for Motor Fuels). This gasification technology is currently under operation in a 3 MW pilot plant at Chemrec's test facility in Piteå, Sweden. The DME synthesis step will be added in 2011 in the "BioDME" project, supported by the European Commission's Seventh Framework Programme (FP7) and the Swedish Energy Agency.

Used for biofuels production, the black liquor gasification route has been shown to have very high conversion efficiency and greenhouse gas reduction potential.

==== Hydrothermal liquefaction ====
Hydrothermal liquefaction is suitable for converting black liquor to advanced biofuels due to the process's ability to handle high moisture inputs.

==== Extraction of lignin ====
Where recovery boiler capacity is limited and a bottleneck in the pulp mill, the lignin in the black liquor may be extracted, then exported or used as fuel in the mill's lime kiln. This often replaces fossil-based fuel with biofuel.

== U.S. tax credit 2007–2010 ==
A tax credit created by the U.S. Congress in 2005 as part of the 2005 Highway Bill to reward and support the use of liquid alternative fuel derived from hydrocarbons in the transportation sector was expanded in 2007 to include non-mobile uses of liquid alternative fuel derived from biomass. This change meant that, in addition to fish processors, animal renderers and meat packers, kraft pulp producers became eligible for the tax credit as a result of their generation and use of black liquor to make energy. For one large company (International Paper) this could amount to as much as $3.7 billion in benefits. Weyerhaeuser announced in May 2009 that it was also pursuing the tax credit. Some paper industry analysts criticized the paper industry's eligibility for the alternative fuel mix tax credit on the grounds that it increased fossil fuel use, but the industry countered that adding a fossil fuel was a requirement of the law and that, regardless, this did not result in a net increase in fossil fuel use since companies were merely replacing the existing fossil fuel they already mixed with black liquor—natural gas—with one of the three fuels specified by the law: gasoline, kerosene or diesel. The bio-fuel credit for black liquor ended on January 1, 2010.
