= Dynamo 7.0 =

DTU Dynamo 7.0
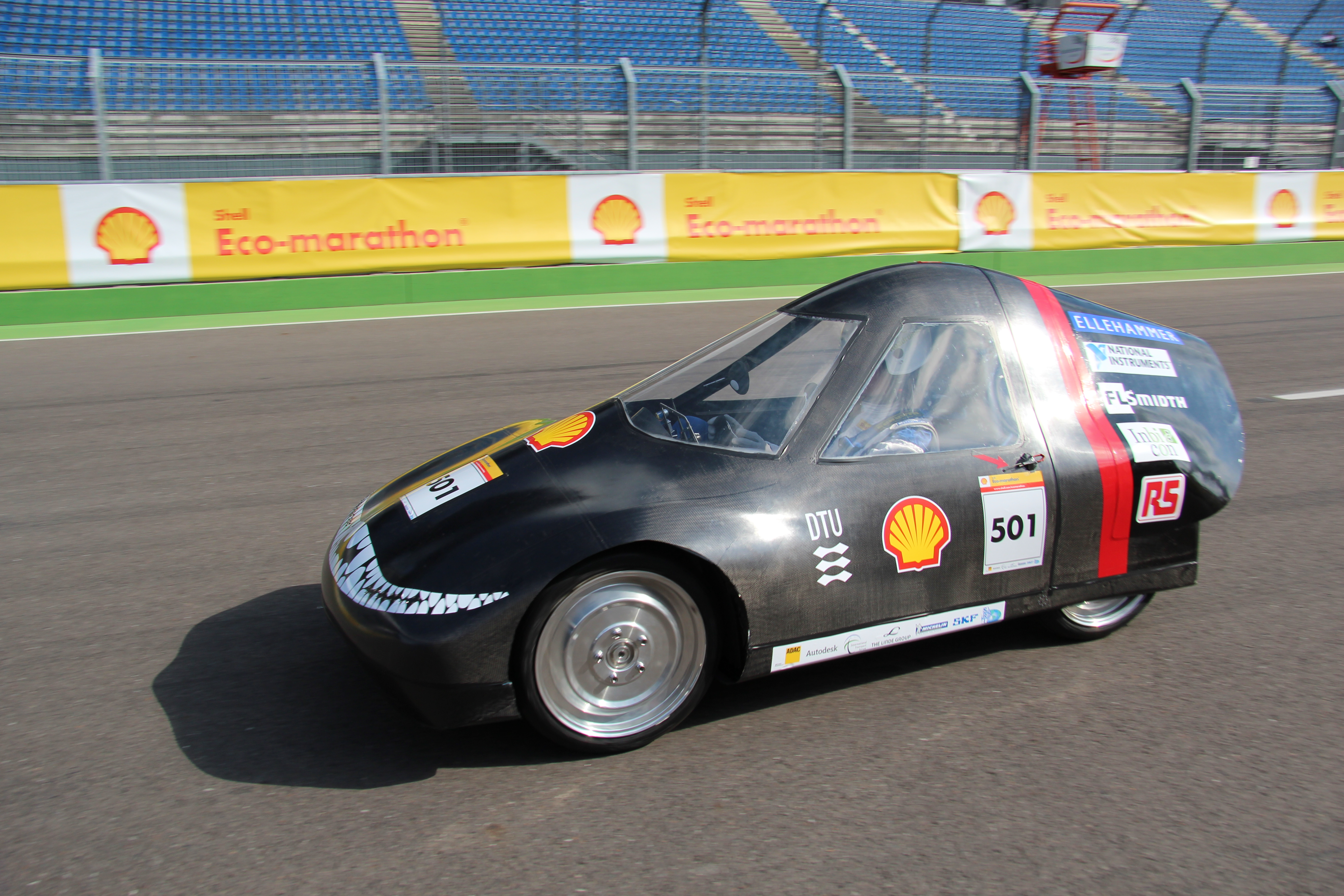

Overview
- Assembly: Kongens Lyngby, Denmark

Powertrain
- Engine: 49 cm^{3} single-cylinder 3 valve SOHC
- Transmission: 2-speed manual

Dimensions
- Kerb weight: approx. 120 kg

Chronology
- Predecessor: Dynamo 6.0
- Successor: Dynamo 8.0

The Dynamo 7.0 is the seventh generation car run by DTU Roadrunners to compete in the Urban Concept class in the Shell Eco-marathon Europe. The car is developed by students at the Technical University of Denmark with the single purpose of achieving the best fuel economy as possible.

The Dynamo 7.0 features a 49 cm^{3} moped engine run on second generation second generation bioethanol.

In the 2011 Shell Eco-marathon Europe the Dynamo 7.0 achieved a record of 509.4 km/L (gasoline equivalent) at the EuroSpeedway Lausitz racetrack, placing it first in the category of Urban Concept cars with internal combustion engines.

== Design and technology ==
=== Engine and drive train ===
A 49 cc four-stroke spark ignited engine originating from a high-end moped is powering the Dynamo 7.0. The engine was in its originally application running on gasoline but has been modified to run on ethanol as a green alternative. For this purpose the engine control unit (ECU) had to be replaced by a custom programmable ECU developed by students participating in the project. The programmable ECU enables user control of the air–fuel ratio. During a race the engine is run with a lean mixture to optimize fuel efficiency resulting in a thermal efficiency of approximately 30 percent.

Engine performance
	Gasoline	Ethanol
Power [kW]	1.8 @ 5500 rpm	2.0 @ 6000 rpm
Torque [Nm]	3.4 @ 4000 rpm	3.5 @ 4000 rpm

The car has only one wheel drive, meaning the engine transfers the torque to the rear right wheel. Torque is transferred to the wheel through a 2-speed manual transmission with an automatic dry clutch.

=== Body and chassis ===
The car is made with separate chassis and bodywork. The aluminium chassis features double wishbone-style suspension. The suspension has no dampers and only act as linkage between the vehicle and the wheel enabling adjustments of ride height, camber and toe.

The body is made from carbon-fiber-reinforced polymer. It carries no structural loads and acts only as a housing guiding the air around the car. The aerodynamics of an eco-marathon challenger is a key parameter to optimize fuel efficiency. Therefore a spoiler was installed subsequently to improve the initial design which suffered from a somewhat high drag coefficient. The body is equipped with LED indicator, head- and rear light.

The car is capable of carrying only the driver together with a suitcase-like object stored in the engine compartment.

== Race results ==
During the Shell Eco-marathon 2011 at EuroSpeedway Lausitz a total of five valid attempts were made. In each attempts improvement in fuel economy was made. This was achieved by optimizing several settings in the car including gear-ratio, fuel amount regulation, clutch engagement and aerodynamics.

2011 Race results
Attempt number	Result [km/L]
1	338.3
2	428.3
3	457.5
4	473.5
5	509.4
