= 2-Ethyl-2-oxazoline =

Names
- Preferred IUPAC name 2-Ethyl-4,5-dihydro-1,3-oxazole
- Other names 2-Ethyloxazoline

Identifiers
CAS Number	10431-98-8
3D model (JSmol)	Interactive image
ChemSpider	59786
ECHA InfoCard	100.030.817
PubChem CID	66412
UNII	B8CD92T4P5
CompTox Dashboard (EPA)	DTXSID9065075
- InChI: InChI=1S/C5H9NO/c1-2-5-6-3-4-7-5/h2-4H2,1H3 Key: NYEZZYQZRQDLEH-UHFFFAOYSA-N
- SMILES: CCC1=NCCO1

Properties
Chemical formula	C_{5}H_{9}NO
Molar mass	99.133 g·mol^{−1}
Density	0.982 g/mL
Melting point	−62 °C (−80 °F; 211 K)
Boiling point	128.4 °C (263.1 °F; 401.5 K)
- Except where otherwise noted, data are given for materials in their standard state (at 25 °C [77 °F], 100 kPa). Infobox references

2-Ethyl-2-oxazoline (EtOx) is an oxazoline which is used particularly as a monomer for the cationic ring-opening polymerization to poly(2-alkyloxazoline)s. This type of polymers are under investigation as readily water-soluble and biocompatible materials for biomedical applications.

== Production ==
=== From propionic acid and derivatives ===
Carboxylic acids, carboxylic esters, carboxylic amides and nitriles can react with 2-amino alcohols at 200 °C upon dehydration to the corresponding N-(2-hydroxy)carbamide, which react further at 260–280 °C upon dehydration to the 2-alkyl-2-oxazoline.

Synthese von 2-Ethyl-2-oxazolin aus Carbonsäurederivaten

For example, N-(2-hydroxyethyl)propionamide is first formed from propionic acid and ethanolamine in 74% yield which can be dehydrated to give 2-ethyl-2-oxazoline in about 75% yield.

Synthese von 2-Ethyl-2-oxazolin über N-(2-Hydroxyethyl)propionamid

Less drastic reaction conditions require the dehydration of the N-(2-hydroxyethyl)propionamide in vacuo in the presence of iron(III)chloride, which delivers the product in 90% yield. An even higher yield of 96.2% is obtained by heating with zinc acetate.

An economic one-pot reaction is heating the salt of propionic acid with ethanolamine at 200 °C in vacuo in the presence of zinc chloride yielding 82% 2-ethyl-2-oxazoline. From the water-containing distillate pure 2-ethyl-2-oxazoline can be isolated by extraction with diethylbenzene and subsequent distillation or by distillation only after addition of diethyl phosphite or dimethyldichlorosilane. The product can be dried to a residual water content of 10 ppm.

In another one-pot reaction propionic acid is converted first with 2-aminoethanol to 2-hydroxyethylamide, than reacted with boric acid at 130 °C yielding a boric acid ester which is finally thermolyzed at 280 °C in 92% yield to 2-ethyl-2-oxazoline.

Synthese von 2-Ethyl-2-oxazolin über Boratester

From propionic acid and thionyl chloride can be obtained propanoyl chloride, which reacts with ethanolamine in the presence of an acid scavenger (for example pyridine) to N-propionyl-2-aminoethanol. With further thionyl chloride this reacts further to 2-chloroethylamide. With the chloride ion as a better leaving group, this intermediate is cyclized by simple heating to the oxazoline. Water must be excluded due to the tendency of oxazolines towards ring-opening by chloride ions during protonation of the imine nitrogen.

Synthese von 2-Ethyl-2-oxazolin über Propionsäureäurechlorid

The direct reaction of propanoyl chloride with 2-chloroethylamine hydrochloride in the presence of triethylamine avoids the formation of water.

Synthese von 2-Ethyl-2-oxazolin mit Chlorethylamin

=== From propanal ===
Propanal reacts with 2-aminoethanol in t-butanol to 2-ethyl-2-oxazoline in the presence of the iodinating reagent 1,3-diiodo-5,5-dimethylhydantoin (DIH) and potassium carbonate.

Synthese von 2-Ethyl-2-oxazolin aus Propionaldehyd

== Properties ==
2-Ethyl-2-oxazoline is a readily water-soluble, colorless liquid which is also soluble in a variety of organic solvents and possesses an amine-like smell. Aqueous solutions react alkaline. The compound is stable in alkaline but hydrolyses under acid action.

== Applications ==
In anhydrous form, 2-ethyl-2-oxazoline is mostly used as a monomer.

The cationic ring-opening polymerization of 2-ethyl-2-oxazoline can be initiated by alkylation with e.g. methyl tosylate or triflates (in particular methyl triflate) and leads to the water-soluble poly(2-ethyl-2-oxazoline) which is a propionyl-substituted linear polyethylenimine and can also be seen as a pseudo-polypeptide.

Kationische lebende Polymerisation von 2-Ethyl-2-oxazolin

The polymerization of 2-ethyl-2-oxazoline can also be carried out as living cationic polymerization.

Copolymers with other 2-alkyl-2-oxazolines and other monomers allow the preparation of random copolymers and block copolymers.

The copolymers obtained can be used as biocompatible drug carriers, in coatings and adhesives, and in many other applications.

The elimination of the propionyl group from poly (2-ethyl-2-oxazoline) yields linear polyethyleneimine.

Herstellung von Linearem Polyethylenimin aus Poly(2-ethyloxazolin)
