= Methyl fluorosulfonate =

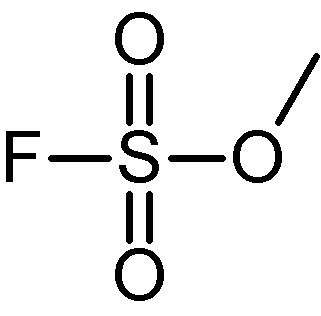

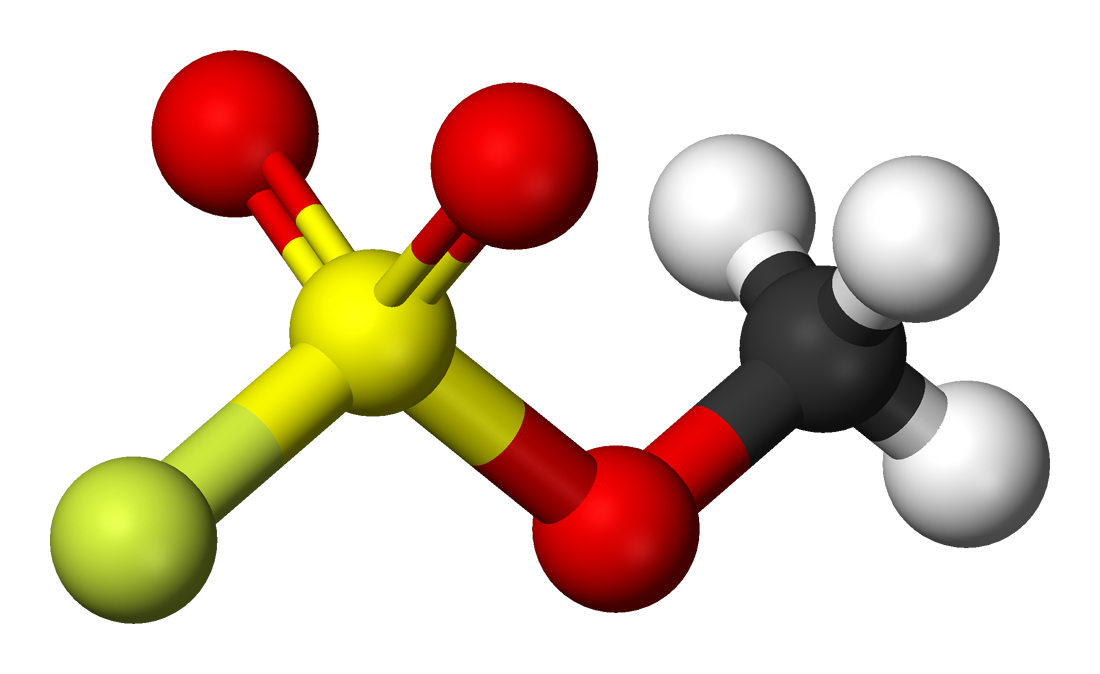

Names
- Preferred IUPAC name Methyl sulfurofluoridate
- Other names: Methyl fluorosulphonate; Fluorosulfonic acid, methyl ester; Methyl fluorosulphate; Magic methyl

Identifiers
CAS Number	421-20-5
3D model (JSmol)	Interactive image
ChemSpider	9486
ECHA InfoCard	100.006.369
PubChem CID	9870
UNII	N015VFJ94Z
CompTox Dashboard (EPA)	DTXSID8073180
- InChI: InChI=1S/CH3FO3S/c1-5-6(2,3)4/h1H3 Key: MBXNQZHITVCSLJ-UHFFFAOYSA-N; InChI=1/CH3FO3S/c1-5-6(2,3)4/h1H3 Key: MBXNQZHITVCSLJ-UHFFFAOYAW
- SMILES: FS(=O)(=O)OC

Properties
Chemical formula	CH_{3}FO_{3}S
Molar mass	114.09 g·mol^{−1}
Density	1.45 g/mL
Boiling point	93 °C (199 °F; 366 K)
- Except where otherwise noted, data are given for materials in their standard state (at 25 °C [77 °F], 100 kPa). verify (what is ?) Infobox references

Methyl fluorosulfonate, also known as magic methyl, is the organic compound with the formula FSO_{2}OCH_{3}. It is a colorless liquid that is used as a strong methylating agent in organic synthesis. Because of several fatal industrial accidents involving this compound, it has largely been replaced by the related reagent methyl trifluoromethanesulfonate.

== Synthesis and reactions ==
It is prepared by distillation of an equimolar mixture of fluorosulfonic acid and dimethyl sulfate. It was originally produced by the reaction of methanol with fluorosulfonic acid.

Methyl fluorosulfonate is a highly electrophilic reagent for methylation. It is ranked as less powerful than methyl trifluoromethanesulfonate.

== Toxicity ==
Toxicity of this reagent is equivalent to that of phosgene with an inhaled LC_{50} (rat, 1 hour) of about 5 ppm. Several cases of poisoning resulting in death from pulmonary edema have been reported.
