= Peter Klason =

Swedish chemist

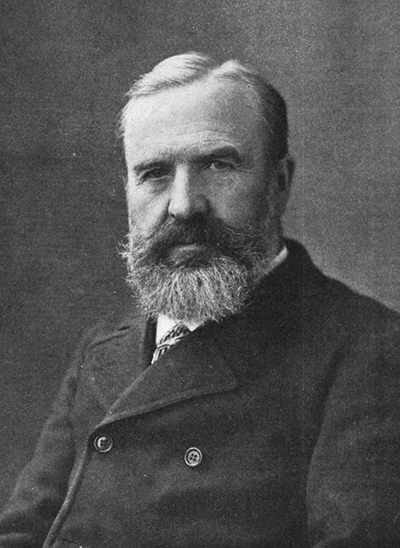
Peter Klason in 1908.

Johan Peter Clason (4 April 1848 in Årstad, Halland County – 1 January 1937 in St. Matthew's parish, Stockholm) was a Swedish chemist. Johan Peter Clason was the son of domain curator, Christopher Adam Claesson and Elna Helena Billing, and was descended from a family originally been called Claus. Johan Peter Clason was the son in law of Carl Johan Hill. Clason became a student in Lund in 1868, PhD and associate professor of the organic chemistry laboratory in 1874 and 1887, all at Lund University. In 1890 he was appointed professor of chemistry and chemical technology at the Technical University in Stockholm.

Clason was a disciple of Christian Wilhelm Blomstrand and authored a memory drawing of his teacher (of the Academy of Sciences Lefnadsteckningar, band 4, 1909). A series of works of organic chemistry and in particular of mercaptans and other sulfur compounds, like dimethyl sulfate, were performed during his time at Lund. They meant in practical terms a simple determination method for organic sulfhydrater, which much later found use in his investigation of the production of sulphate cellulose emerging smelly substances, which he showed in the material consists of methyl mercaptan.
