= Dimethyl sulfate =

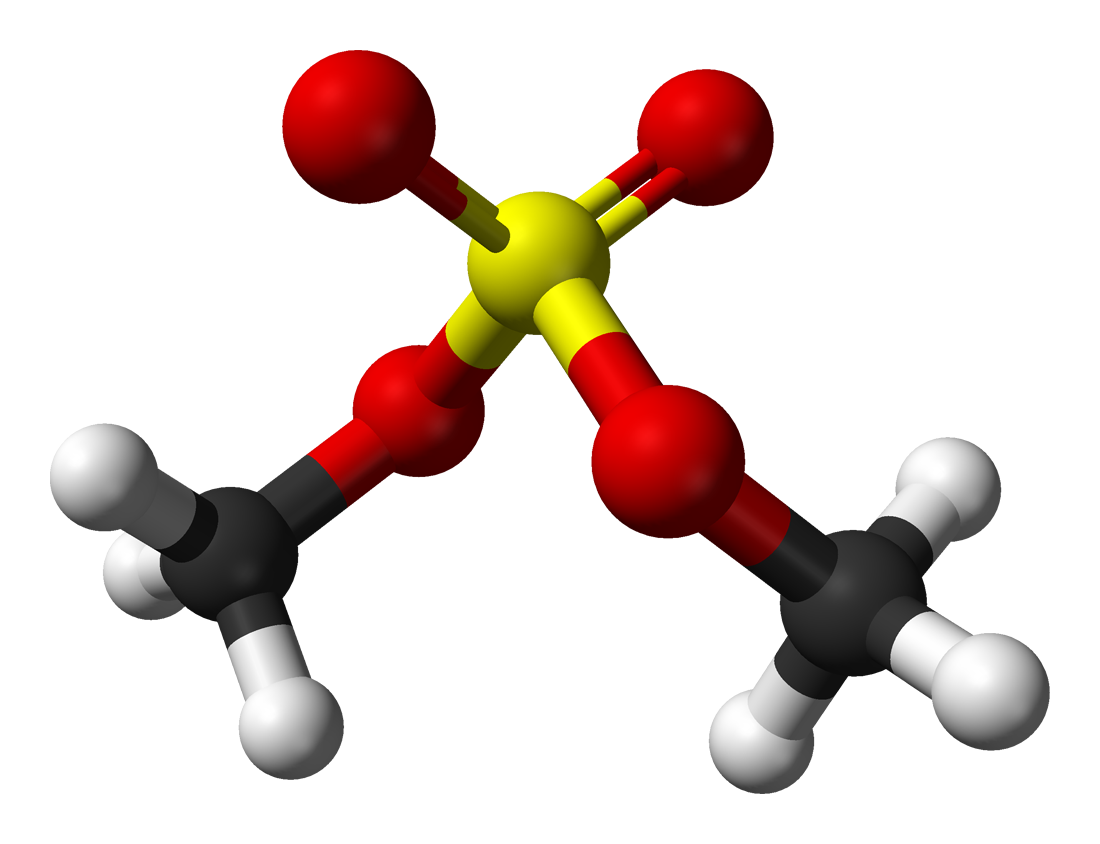

Names
- Preferred IUPAC name Dimethyl sulfate
- Other names Dimethyl sulphate; Sulfuric acid dimethyl ester; Dimethyl ester of sulfuric acid; Methyl sulfate, di-

Identifiers
| CAS Number | 77-78-1 |
| 3D model (JSmol) | Interactive image |
| Abbreviations | DMS; DMSO_{4} Me_{2}SO_{4} |
| ChEBI | CHEBI:59050 |
| ChEMBL | ChEMBL162150 |
| ChemSpider | 6252 |
| ECHA InfoCard | 100.000.963 |
| KEGG | C19177 |
| PubChem CID | 6497 |
| UNII | JW5CW40Z50 |
| CompTox Dashboard (EPA) | DTXSID5024055 |
- InChI: InChI=1S/C2H6O4S/c1-5-7(3,4)6-2/h1-2H3 Key: VAYGXNSJCAHWJZ-UHFFFAOYSA-N; InChI=1/C2H6O4S/c1-5-7(3,4)6-2/h1-2H3 Key: VAYGXNSJCAHWJZ-UHFFFAOYAK
- SMILES: COS(=O)(=O)OC

Properties
| Chemical formula | C_{2}H_{6}O_{4}S |
| Molar mass | 126.13 g·mol^{−1} |
| Appearance | Colorless, oily liquid |
| Odor | faint, onion-like |
| Density | 1.33 g/ml, liquid |
| Melting point | −32 °C (−26 °F; 241 K) |
| Boiling point | 188 °C (370 °F; 461 K) (decomposes) |
| Solubility in water | Reacts |
| Solubility | Methanol, dichloromethane, acetone |
| Vapor pressure | 0.1 mmHg (20 °C) |
| Magnetic susceptibility (χ) | −62.2×10^{−6} cm^{3}/mol |

Hazards
- Occupational safety and health (OHS/OSH)
| Main hazards | Extremely toxic, contact hazard, inhalation hazard, corrosive, environmental hazard, carcinogenic, mutagenic |
- GHS labelling
| Pictograms | (GHS08: Health hazard) (GHS05: Corrosive) (GHS06: Toxic) |
| Signal word | Danger |
| Hazard statements | H301, H314, H317, H330, H335, H341, H350 |
| NFPA 704 (fire diamond) | 4 2 1 |
| Flash point | 83 °C; 182 °F; 356 K |
- Lethal dose or concentration (LD, LC)
| LC_{50} (median concentration) | 8.6 ppm (rat, 4 hr); 75 ppm (guinea pig, 20 min); 53 ppm (mouse); 32 ppm (guinea pig, 1 hr) |
| LC_{Lo} (lowest published) | 97 ppm (human, 10 min) |
- NIOSH (US health exposure limits)
| PEL (Permissible) | TWA 1 ppm (5 mg/m^{3}) [skin] |
| REL (Recommended) | Ca TWA 0.1 ppm (0.5 mg/m^{3}) [skin] |
| IDLH (Immediate danger) | Ca [7 ppm] |

Related compounds
| Related compounds | Diethyl sulfate, methyl triflate, dimethyl carbonate |
- Except where otherwise noted, data are given for materials in their standard state (at 25 °C [77 °F], 100 kPa). verify (what is ?) Infobox references

Dimethyl sulfate (DMS) is a chemical compound with formula (CH_{3}O)_{2}SO_{2}. As the diester of methanol and sulfuric acid, its formula is often written as (CH_{3})_{2}SO_{4} or Me_{2}SO_{4}, where CH_{3} or Me is methyl. Me_{2}SO_{4} is mainly used as a methylating agent in organic synthesis. Me_{2}SO_{4} is a colourless oily liquid with a slight onion-like odour. Like all strong alkylating agents, Me_{2}SO_{4} is highly toxic. Its use as a laboratory reagent has been superseded to some extent by methyl triflate, CF_{3}SO_{3}CH_{3}, the methyl ester of trifluoromethanesulfonic acid.

== History ==
Impure dimethyl sulfate was prepared in the early 19th century. J. P. Claesson later extensively studied its preparation.

It was investigated for possible use in chemical warfare in World War I in 75% to 25% mixture with methyl chlorosulfonate (CH_{3}ClO_{3}S) called "C-stoff" in Germany, or with chlorosulfonic acid called "Rationite" in France.

The esterification of sulfuric acid with methanol was described in 1835:

2 CH_{3}OH + H_{2}SO_{4} ⇌ (CH_{3})_{2}SO_{4} + 2 H_{2}O

== Production ==
Dimethyl sulfate is produced commercially by the continuous reaction of dimethyl ether with sulfur trioxide:

CH_{3}OCH_{3} + SO_{3} → (CH_{3})_{2}SO_{4}

Dimethyl sulfate can be synthesized in the laboratory by several methods. The reaction of methyl nitrite and methyl chlorosulfonate also results in dimethyl sulfate:

CH_{3}ONO + (CH_{3})OSO_{2}Cl → (CH_{3})_{2}SO_{4} + NOCl

Despite its obvious appeal, the esterification of sulfuric acid with methanol produces only minute quantities of dimethyl sulfate. The equilibrium constant does not favour its formation. Additionally, any dimethyl sulfate that is formed can react further and irreversibly with methanol to give methyl bisulfate and dimethyl ether:

(CH_{3})_{2}SO_{4} + CH_{3}OH → CH_{3}−O−S(=O)_{2}−OH + (CH_{3})_{2}O

== Reactions and uses ==
Dimethyl sulfate is a reagent for the methylation of phenols, amines, and thiols. One methyl group is transferred more quickly than the second. Methyl transfer is assumed to occur via an S_{N}2 reaction. Compared to other methylating agents, dimethyl sulfate is preferred by the industry because of its low cost and high reactivity.

=== Methylation at oxygen ===
Commonly dimethyl sulfate is employed to methylate phenols.

C_{6}H_{5}ONa + (CH_{3}O)_{2}SO_{2} → C_{6}H_{5}OCH_{3} + (CH_{3}O)SO_{3}Na

In some cases, simple alcohols are also methylated, as illustrated by the conversion of tert-butanol to t-butyl methyl ether:

(CH_{3})_{3}COH + (CH_{3}O)_{2}SO_{2} →(CH_{3})_{3}COCH_{3} + (CH_{3}O)SO_{3}H

The methylation of sugars is called Haworth methylation. The methylation of ketones is called the Lavergne reaction.

=== Methylation at amine nitrogen ===
Me_{2}SO_{4} is used to prepare both quaternary ammonium salts or tertiary amines:

C_{6}H_{5}CH=NC_{4}H_{9} + (CH_{3}O)_{2}SO_{2} → C_{6}H_{5}CH=N^{+}(CH_{3})C_{4}H_{9}[CH_{3}OSO_{3}]^{−}

Quaternized fatty ammonium compounds are used as a surfactant or fabric softener. Methylation to create a tertiary amine is illustrated as:

CH_{3}(C_{6}H_{4})NH_{2} + (CH_{3}O)_{2}SO_{2} (in NaHCO_{3} aq) → CH_{3}(C_{6}H_{4})N(CH_{3})_{2} + Na(CH_{3})SO_{4}

=== Methylation at sulfur ===
Thiolate salts are easily methylated by Me_{2}SO_{4} to give methyl thioethers:

RSNa + (CH_{3}O)_{2}SO_{2} →CH_{3}SR + (CH_{3}O)SO_{3}Na

In a related example:

p-CH_{3}C_{6}H_{4}SO_{2}Na + (CH_{3}O)_{2}SO_{2} → p-CH_{3}C_{6}H_{4}SO_{2}CH_{3} + Na(CH_{3})SO_{4}

This method has been used to prepare thioesters from thiocarboxylic acids:

RC(O)SH + (CH_{3}O)_{2}SO_{2} → RC(O)S(CH_{3}) + HOSO_{3}CH_{3}

=== Reactions with nucleic acids ===
Dimethyl sulfate (DMS) is used to determine the secondary structure of RNA. At neutral pH, DMS methylates unpaired adenine and cytosine residues at their canonical Watson–Crick faces, but it cannot methylate base-paired nucleotides. Using the method known as DMS-MaPseq, RNA is incubated with DMS to methylate unpaired bases. Then the RNA is reverse-transcribed; the reverse transcriptase frequently adds an incorrect DNA base when it encounters a methylated RNA base. These mutations can be detected via sequencing, and the RNA is inferred to be single-stranded at bases with above-background mutation rates.

Dimethyl sulfate can affect the base-specific cleavage of DNA by attacking the imidazole rings present in guanine. Dimethyl sulfate also methylates adenine in single-stranded portions of DNA (for example, those with proteins like RNA polymerase progressively melting and re-annealing the DNA). Upon re-annealing, these methyl groups interfere with adenine-guanine base-pairing. Nuclease S1 can then be used to cut the DNA in single-stranded regions (anywhere with a methylated adenine). This is an important technique for analyzing protein-DNA interactions.

== Alternatives ==
Although dimethyl sulfate is highly effective and affordable, its very high toxicity has encouraged the use of other methylating reagents such as methyl iodide, which is less hazardous but more expensive, or dimethyl carbonate, which is far less reactive but has far lower toxicity than dimethyl sulfate or methyl iodide. In general, the toxicity of methylating agents is correlated with their efficiency as methyl transfer reagents.

== Safety ==
Dimethyl sulfate is carcinogenic and mutagenic, highly poisonous, corrosive, and environmentally hazardous. It is absorbed through the skin, mucous membranes, and gastrointestinal tract, and can cause a fatal delayed respiratory tract reaction. An ocular reaction is also common. There is no strong odor or immediate irritation to warn of lethal concentration in the air. The LD_{50} (acute, oral) is 205 mg/kg (rat) and 140 mg/kg (mouse), and LC_{50} (acute) is 45 ppm per 4 hours (rat). The vapor pressure of 65 Pa is sufficiently large to produce a lethal concentration in air by evaporation at 20 °C. Delayed toxicity allows potentially fatal exposures to occur prior to development of any warning symptoms. Symptoms may be delayed 6–24 h. Concentrated solutions of bases (ammonia, alkalis) can be used to hydrolyze minor spills and residues on contaminated equipment, but the reaction may become violent with larger amounts of dimethyl sulfate (see ICSC). Although the compound hydrolyses, treatment with water cannot be assumed to decontaminate it.

One hypothesis regarding the apparently mysterious 1994 "toxic lady" incident is that the person at the centre of the incident had built up dimethyl sulfone crystals in her blood, which were converted by an unknown mechanism to dimethyl sulfate vapour that poisoned attending medical staff.
