= Dimethyl ether =

Dimethyl Ether
Skeletal formula of dimethyl ether with all implicit hydrogens shown
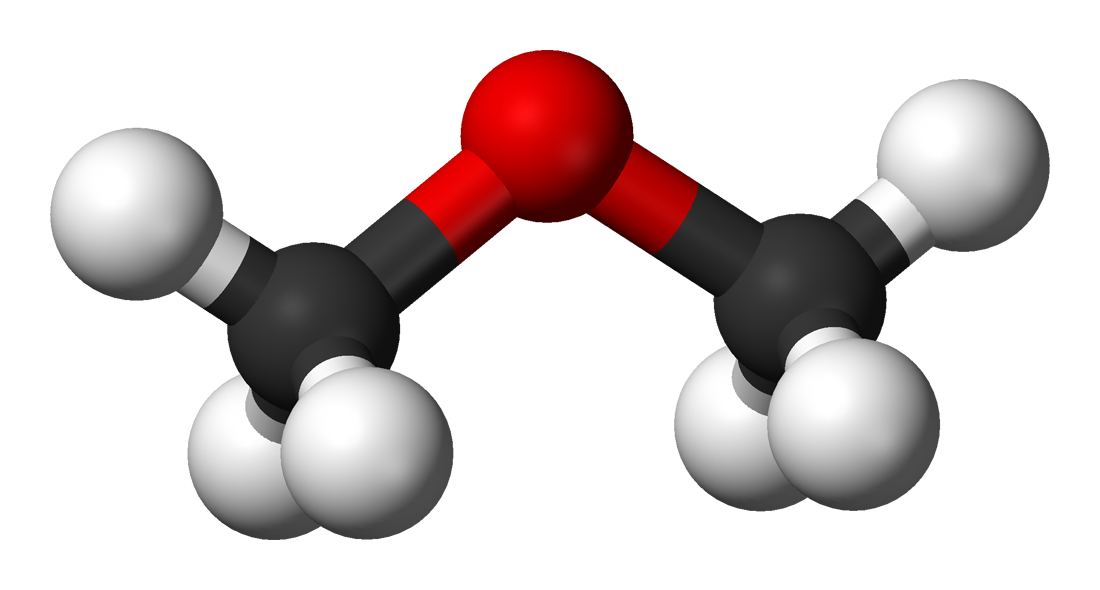
Ball and stick model of dimethyl ether

Names
- IUPAC name Methoxymethane
- Preferred IUPAC name Methoxymethane
- Other names Dimethyl ether R-E170; Demeon; Dimethyl oxide Dymel A Methyl ether Methyl oxide Mether; Wood ether 2-oxapropane

Identifiers
CAS Number	115-10-6
3D model (JSmol)	Interactive image
Abbreviations	DME; Me_{2}O
Beilstein Reference	1730743
ChEBI	CHEBI:28887
ChEMBL	ChEMBL119178
ChemSpider	7956
ECHA InfoCard	100.003.696
EC Number	204-065-8
KEGG	C11144
MeSH	Dimethyl+ether
PubChem CID	8254
RTECS number	PM4780000
UNII	AM13FS69BX
UN number	1033
CompTox Dashboard (EPA)	DTXSID8026937
- InChI: InChI=1S/C2H6O/c1-3-2/h1-2H3 Key: LCGLNKUTAGEVQW-UHFFFAOYSA-N; InChI=1/C2H6O/c1-3-2/h1-2H3 Key: LCGLNKUTAGEVQW-UHFFFAOYAU
- SMILES: COC

Properties
Chemical formula	C_{2}H_{6}O
Molar mass	46.069 g·mol^{−1}
Appearance	Colorless gas
Odor	Ethereal
Density	2.1146 kg m^{−3} (gas, 0 °C, 1013 mbar); 0.735 g/mL (liquid, −25 °C)
Melting point	−141 °C; −222 °F; 132 K
Boiling point	−24 °C; −11 °F; 249 K
Solubility in water	71 g/L (at 20 °C (68 °F))
log P	0.022
Vapor pressure	592.8 kPa
Magnetic susceptibility (χ)	−26.3×10^{−6} cm^{3} mol^{−1}
Dipole moment	1.30 D

Thermochemistry
Heat capacity (C)	65.57 J K^{−1} mol^{−1}
Std enthalpy of formation (Δ_{f}H^{⦵}_{298})	−184.1 kJ mol^{−1}
Std enthalpy of combustion (Δ_{c}H^{⦵}_{298})	−1460.4 kJ mol^{−1}

Hazards
- GHS labelling
Pictograms	(GHS02: Flammable)
Signal word	Danger
Hazard statements	H220
Precautionary statements	P210, P377, P381, P403
NFPA 704 (fire diamond)	2 4 1
Flash point	−41 °C (−42 °F; 232 K)
Autoignition temperature	350 °C (662 °F; 623 K)
Explosive limits	27 %
Safety data sheet (SDS)	≥99% Sigma-Aldrich

Related compounds
Related ethers	Diethyl ether Polyethylene glycol
Related compounds	Ethanol Methanol
- Except where otherwise noted, data are given for materials in their standard state (at 25 °C [77 °F], 100 kPa). verify (what is ?) Infobox references

Dimethyl ether (DME; also known as methoxymethane) is the organic compound with the formula CH_{3}OCH_{3}, (sometimes ambiguously simplified to C_{2}H_{6}O as it is an isomer of ethanol). The simplest ether, it is a colorless gas that is a useful precursor to other organic compounds and an aerosol propellant that is currently being demonstrated for use in a variety of fuel applications.

Dimethyl ether was first synthesised by Jean-Baptiste Dumas and Eugene Péligot in 1835 by distillation of methanol and sulfuric acid.

== Production ==
Approximately 50,000 tons were produced in 1985 in Western Europe by dehydration of methanol:

2 CH_{3}OH → (CH_{3})_{2}O + H_{2}O

The required methanol is obtained from synthesis gas (syngas). Other possible improvements call for a dual catalyst system that permits both methanol synthesis and dehydration in the same process unit, with no methanol isolation and purification. Both the one-step and two-step processes above are commercially available. The two-step process is relatively simple and start-up costs are relatively low. A one-step liquid-phase process is in development.

=== From biomass ===
Dimethyl ether is a synthetic second generation biofuel (BioDME), which can be produced from lignocellulosic biomass. The EU is considering BioDME in its potential biofuel mix in 2030. It can also be made from biogas or methane from animal, food, and agricultural waste, or even from shale gas or natural gas.

The Volvo Group is the coordinator for the European Community Seventh Framework Programme project BioDME where Chemrec's BioDME pilot plant is based on black liquor gasification in Piteå, Sweden.

== Applications ==
The largest use of dimethyl ether is as the feedstock for the production of the methylating agent, dimethyl sulfate, which entails its reaction with sulfur trioxide:

$\ce{CH3OCH3 + SO3 -> (CH3)2SO4}$

Dimethyl ether can also be converted into acetic acid using carbonylation technology related to the Monsanto acetic acid process:

$\ce{CH3-O-CH3 + 2 CO + H2O -> 2 CH3COOH}$

=== Laboratory reagent and solvent ===
Dimethyl ether is a low-temperature solvent and extraction agent, applicable to specialised laboratory procedures. Its usefulness is limited by its low boiling point (−23 °C (−9 °F)), but the same property facilitates its removal from reaction mixtures. Dimethyl ether is the precursor to the useful alkylating agent, trimethyloxonium tetrafluoroborate.

=== Niche applications ===
A mixture of dimethyl ether and propane is used in some over-the-counter "freeze spray" products to treat warts by freezing them. In this role, it has supplanted halocarbon compounds (Freon).

Dimethyl ether is a component of certain high temperature "Map-Pro" blowtorch gas blends, supplanting the use of methyl acetylene and propadiene mixtures.

Dimethyl ether is used as a propellant in aerosol products. Such products include hair spray, bug spray and some aerosol glue products.

== Research ==
=== Fuel ===
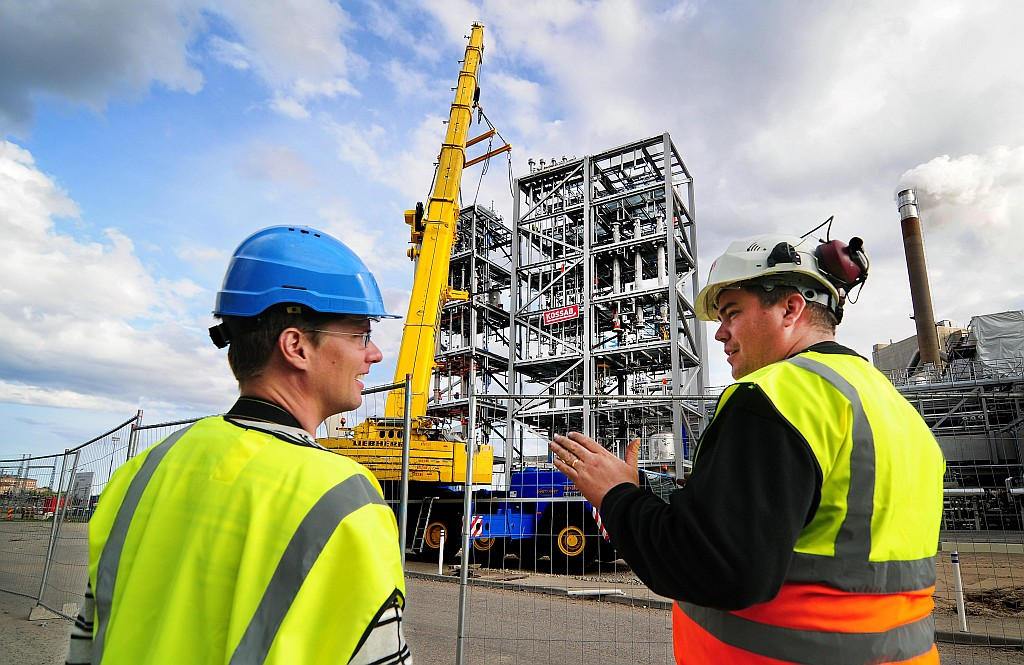
Installation of BioDME synthesis towers at Chemrec's pilot facility

A potentially major use of dimethyl ether is as substitute for propane in LPG used as fuel in household and industry. Dimethyl ether can also be used as a blendstock in propane autogas.

It is also a promising fuel in diesel engines, and gas turbines. For diesel engines, an advantage is the high cetane number of 55, compared to that of diesel fuel from petroleum, which is 40–53. Only moderate modifications are needed to convert a diesel engine to burn dimethyl ether. The simplicity of this short carbon chain compound leads to very low emissions of particulate matter during combustion. For these reasons as well as being sulfur-free, dimethyl ether meets even the most stringent emission regulations in Europe (EURO5), U.S. (U.S. 2010), and Japan (2009 Japan).

At the European Shell Eco Marathon, an unofficial World Championship for mileage, a vehicle running on 100% dimethyl ether achieved a fuel economy of 0.170L/100 km, fuel equivalent to gasoline with a 50 cm^{3} displacement 2-stroke engine.

To study the dimethyl ether for the combustion process a chemical kinetic mechanism is required which can be used for Computational fluid dynamics calculation.

=== Refrigerant ===
Dimethyl ether is a refrigerant with ASHRAE refrigerant designation R-E170. It is also used in refrigerant blends with e.g. ammonia, carbon dioxide, butane and propene. Dimethyl ether was the first refrigerant. In 1876, the French engineer Charles Tellier bought the ex-Elder-Dempster a 690 tons cargo ship Eboe and fitted a methyl-ether refrigerating plant of his design. The ship was renamed Le Frigorifique and successfully imported a cargo of refrigerated meat from Argentina. However the machinery could be improved and in 1877 another refrigerated ship called Paraguay with a refrigerating plant improved by Ferdinand Carré was put into service on the South American run.

== Safety ==
Unlike other alkyl ethers, dimethyl ether resists autoxidation. Dimethyl ether is also relatively non-toxic, although it is highly flammable. On July 28, 1948, a BASF factory in Ludwigshafen suffered an explosion after 30 tonnes of dimethyl ether leaked from a tank and ignited in the air. 200 people died, and a third of the industrial plant was destroyed.

== Data sheet ==
=== Vapor pressure ===
Experimental vapor pressures of dimethyl ether
Temperature (K)	Pressure (kPa)
233.128	54.61
238.126	68.49
243.157	85.57
248.152	105.59
253.152	129.42
258.16	157.53
263.16	190.44
268.161	228.48
273.153	272.17
278.145	321.87
283.16	378.66
288.174	443.57
293.161	515.53
298.172	596.21
303.16	687.37
305.16	726.26
308.158	787.07
313.156	897.59
316.154	968.55
318.158	1018.91
323.148	1152.35
328.149	1298.23
333.157	1457.5
333.159	1457.76
338.154	1631.01
343.147	1818.8
348.147	2022.45
353.146	2242.74
353.158	2243.07
358.145	2479.92
363.148	2735.67
368.158	3010.81
373.154	3305.67
378.15	3622.6
383.143	3962.25
388.155	4331.48
393.158	4725.02
398.157	5146.82
400.378	5355.8

== See also ==
- Methanol economy
