= Hydrothermal liquefaction =

Process to convert wet biomass into crude-like oil

Hydrothermal liquefaction (HTL) is a thermal depolymerization process used to convert wet biomass, and other macromolecules, into crude-like oil under moderate temperature and high pressure. The crude-like oil has high energy density with a lower heating value of 33.8-36.9 MJ/kg and 5-20 wt% oxygen and renewable chemicals. The process has also been called hydrous pyrolysis.

The reaction usually involves homogeneous and/or heterogeneous catalysts to improve the quality of products and yields. Carbon and hydrogen of an organic material, such as biomass, peat or low-ranked coals (lignite) are thermo-chemically converted into hydrophobic compounds with low viscosity and high solubility. Depending on the processing conditions, the fuel can be used as produced for heavy engines, including marine and rail or upgraded to transportation fuels, such as diesel, gasoline or jet-fuels.

The process may be significant in the creation of fossil fuels. Simple heating without water, anhydrous pyrolysis has long been considered to take place naturally during the catagenesis of kerogens to fossil fuels. In recent decades it has been found that water under pressure causes more efficient breakdown of kerogens at lower temperatures than without it. The carbon isotope ratio of natural gas also suggests that hydrogen from water has been added during creation of the gas.

== History ==
As early as the 1920s, the concept of using hot water and alkali catalysts to produce oil out of biomass was proposed. In 1939, U.S. patent 2,177,557 described a two-stage process in which a mixture of water, wood chips, and calcium hydroxide is heated in the first stage at temperatures in a range of 220 to 360 °C (428 to 680 °F), with the pressure "higher than that of saturated steam at the temperature used." This produces "oils and alcohols" which are collected. The materials are then subjected in a second stage to what is called "dry distillation", which produces "oils and ketones". Temperatures and pressures for this second stage are not disclosed.

These processes were the foundation of later HTL technologies that attracted research interest especially during the 1970s oil embargo. It was around that time that a high-pressure (hydrothermal) liquefaction process was developed at the Pittsburgh Energy Research Center (PERC) and later demonstrated (at the 100 kg/h scale) at the Albany Biomass Liquefaction Experimental Facility at Albany, Oregon, US. In 1982, Shell Oil developed the HTU™ process in the Netherlands. Other organizations that have previously demonstrated HTL of biomass include Hochschule für Angewandte Wissenschaften Hamburg, Germany, SCF Technologies in Copenhagen, Denmark, EPA's Water Engineering Research Laboratory, Cincinnati, Ohio, USA, and Changing World Technology Inc. (CWT), Philadelphia, Pennsylvania, USA. Today, technology companies such as Licella/Ignite Energy Resources (Australia), Arbios Biotech, a Licella/Canfor joint venture, Altaca Energy (Turkey), Circlia Nordic (Denmark), Steeper Energy (Denmark, Canada) continue to explore the commercialization of HTL. Construction has begun in Teesside, UK, for a catalytic hydrothermal liquefaction plant that aims to process 80,000 tonnes per year of mixed plastic waste by 2022.

The Chuntoh Ghuna facility in Prince George, British Columbia, has been commissioned as a commercial producer of bio-oil from forestry residue. Chuntoh Ghuna translates from the Dakelh language of the Lheidli T'enneh First Nation as “the forest lives”. The Arbios Biotech (subsidiary of Licella) facility, located on Lheidli T'enneh First Nation land, has the capacity to process 25,000 dry tonnes of biomass per year, to produce 50,000 barrels of bio-oil, suitable for further refining.

== Chemical reactions ==
In hydrothermal liquefaction processes, long carbon chain molecules in biomass are thermally cracked and oxygen is removed in the form of H_{2}O (dehydration) and CO_{2} (decarboxylation). These reactions result in the production of high H/C ratio bio-oil. Simplified descriptions of dehydration and decarboxylation reactions can be found in the literature (e.g. Asghari and Yoshida (2006) and Snåre et al. (2007).

== Process ==
Most applications of hydrothermal liquefaction operate at temperatures between 250-550 °C and high pressures of 5-25 MPa as well as catalysts for 20–60 minutes, although higher or lower temperatures can be used to optimize gas or liquid yields, respectively. At these temperatures and pressures, the water present in the biomass becomes either subcritical or supercritical, depending on the conditions, and acts as a solvent, reactant, and catalyst to facilitate the reaction of biomass to bio-oil.

The exact conversion of biomass to bio-oil is dependent on several variables:

- Feedstock composition
- Temperature and heating rate
- Pressure
- Solvent
- Residence time
- Catalysts

=== Feedstock ===
Theoretically, any biomass can be converted into bio-oil using hydrothermal liquefaction regardless of water content, and various different biomasses have been tested, from forestry and agriculture residues, sewage sludges, food process wastes, to emerging non-food biomass such as algae. The composition of cellulose, hemicellulose, protein, and lignin in the feedstock influence the yield and quality of the oil from the process.

Zhang et al., at the University of Illinois, report on a hydrous pyrolysis process in which swine manure is converted to oil by heating the swine manure and water in the presence of carbon monoxide in a closed container. For that process they report that a temperatures of at least 275 °C (527 °F) is required to convert the swine manure to oil, and temperatures above about 335 °C (635 °F) reduces the amount of oil produced. The Zhang et al. process produces pressures of about 7 to 18 Mpa (1000 to 2600 psi - 69 to 178 atm), with higher temperatures producing higher pressures. Zhang et al. used a retention time of 120 minutes for the reported study, but report at higher temperatures a time of less than 30 minutes results in significant production of oil.

Barbero-López et al., tested in the University of Eastern Finland the use of spent mushroom substrate and tomato plant residues as feedstock for hydrothermal liquefaction. They focused in the hydrothermal liquids produced, rich in many different constituents, and found that they are potential antifungals against several fungi causing decay on wood, but their ecotoxicity was lower than that of the commercial Cu-based wood preservative. The effectiveness of the antifungal activity of the hydrothermal liquids varied mostly due to liquid concentration and strain sensitivity, while the different feedstocks did not have such a significant effect.

A commercialized process using hydrous pyrolysis (see the article Thermal depolymerization) used by Changing World Technologies, Inc. (CWT) and its subsidiary Renewable Environmental Solutions, LLC (RES) to convert turkey offal. As a two-stage process, the first stage to convert the turkey offal to hydrocarbons at a temperature of 200 to 300 °C (392 to 572 °F) and a second stage to crack the oil into light hydrocarbons at a temperature of near 500 °C (932 °F). Adams et al. report only that the first stage heating is "under pressure"; Lemley, in a non-technical article on the CWT process, reports that for the first stage (for conversion) a temperature of about 260 °C (500 °F) and a pressure of about 600 psi, with a time for the conversion of "usually about 15 minutes". For the second stage (cracking), Lemley reports a temperature of about 480 °C (896 °F).

=== Temperature and heating rate ===
Temperature plays a major role in the conversion of biomass to bio-oil. The temperature of the reaction determines the depolymerization of the biomass to bio-oil, as well as the repolymerization into char. While the ideal reaction temperature is dependent on the feedstock used, temperatures above ideal lead to an increase in char formation and eventually increased gas formation, while lower than ideal temperatures reduce depolymerization and overall product yields.

Similarly to temperature, the rate of heating plays a critical role in the production of the different phase streams, due to the prevalence of secondary reactions at non-optimum heating rates. Secondary reactions become dominant in heating rates that are too low, leading to the formation of char. While high heating rates are required to form liquid bio-oil, there is a threshold heating rate and temperature where liquid production is inhibited and gas production is favored in secondary reactions.

=== Pressure ===
Pressure (along with temperature) determines the super- or subcritical state of solvents as well as overall reaction kinetics and the energy inputs required to yield the desirable HTL products (oil, gas, chemicals, char etc.).

=== Residence Time ===
Hydrothermal liquefaction is a fast process, resulting in low residence times for depolymerization to occur. Typical residence times are measured in minutes (15 to 60 minutes); however, the residence time is highly dependent on the reaction conditions, including feedstock, solvent ratio and temperature. As such, optimization of the residence time is necessary to ensure a complete depolymerization without allowing further reactions to occur.

=== Catalysts ===
While water acts as a catalyst in the reaction, other catalysts can be added to the reaction vessel to optimize the conversion. Previously used catalysts include water-soluble inorganic compounds and salts, including KOH and Na_{2}CO_{3}, as well as transition metal catalysts using nickel, palladium, platinum and ruthenium supported on either carbon, silica or alumina. The addition of these catalysts can lead to an oil yield increase of 20% or greater, due to the catalysts converting the protein, cellulose, and hemicellulose into oil. This ability for catalysts to convert biomaterials other than fats and oils to bio-oil allows for a wider range of feedstock to be used.

== Environmental Impact ==
Biofuels that are produced through hydrothermal liquefaction are carbon neutral, meaning that there are no net carbon emissions produced when burning the biofuel. The plant materials used to produce bio-oils use photosynthesis to grow, and as such consume carbon dioxide from the atmosphere. The burning of the biofuels produced releases carbon dioxide into the atmosphere, but is nearly completely offset by the carbon dioxide consumed from growing the plants, resulting in a release of only 15-18 g of CO_{2} per kWh of energy produced. This is substantially lower than the releases rate of fossil fuel technologies, which can range from releases of 955 g/kWh (coal), 813 g/kWh (oil), and 446 g/kWh (natural gas). Recently, Steeper Energy announced that the carbon intensity (CI) of its Hydrofaction™ oil is 15 CO_{2}eq/MJ according to GHGenius model (version 4.03a), while diesel fuel is 93.55 CO_{2}eq/MJ.

Hydrothermal liquefaction is a clean process that doesn't produce harmful compounds, such as ammonia, NO_{x}, or SO_{x}. Instead the heteroatoms, including nitrogen, sulfur, and chlorine, are converted into harmless byproducts such as N_{2} and inorganic acids that can be neutralized with bases.

== Comparison with pyrolysis and other biomass to liquid technologies ==
The HTL process differs from pyrolysis as it can process wet biomass and produce a bio-oil that contains approximately twice the energy density of pyrolysis oil. Pyrolysis is a related process to HTL, but biomass must be processed and dried in order to increase the yield. The presence of water in pyrolysis drastically increases the heat of vaporization of the organic material, increasing the energy required to decompose the biomass. Typical pyrolysis processes require a water content of less than 40% to suitably convert the biomass to bio-oil. This requires considerable pretreatment of wet biomass such as tropical grasses, which contain a water content as high as 80-85%, and even further treatment for aquatic species, which can contain higher than 90% water content.

The HTL oil can contain up to 80% of the feedstock carbon content (single pass). HTL oil has good potential to yield bio-oil with "drop-in" properties that can be directly distributed in existing petroleum infrastructure.

The energy returned on energy invested (EROEI) of these processes is uncertain and/or has not been measured. Furthermore, products of hydrous pyrolysis might not meet current fuel standards. Further processing may be required to produce fuels.

== See also ==
- Gasification
- Pyrolysis
- Thermal decomposition
- Thermal depolymerization
