= MGG =

MGG or mgg can refer to:

== Companies and organizations ==
- Elmagal Aviation Services, an airline based in Sudan, by ICAO code; see List of airline codes
- Money Gap Group, a financial company based in the United Kingdom
- MGG Investment Group LP, a company based in New York City that signed an agreement with Grass Valley (company)
- Manchester Girl Geeks, a branch of Girl Geek Dinners, an organization which promotes women in computing
- RAG Montan Immobilien GmbH (formerly known as Montan-Grundstücksgesellschaft GmbH), a company that had launched a project near the Ewald Colliery coal mine in Herten, Germany
- Magsarjav, an agricultural products company listed on the Mongolian Stock Exchange; see List of companies listed on the Mongolian Stock Exchange

== Other uses ==
- Die Musik in Geschichte und Gegenwart, a German-language music encyclopedia
- May-Grünwald-Giemsa stain, a type of cell stain in biomedicine
- Manglia Gaon railway station, a train station in Indore, Madhya Pradesh, India, by station code
- Mpumpong language, a language spoken in Cameroon, by ISO 639 code
- MGG, the German-language version of the 1984 operating system Sinclair QDOS
- Mingguang, a city in Anhui province, China; see List of administrative divisions of Anhui
