= Thermal depolymerization =

Process for breaking-down polymers

Thermal depolymerization (TDP) is the process of converting a polymer into a monomer or a mixture of monomers, by predominantly thermal means. It may be catalyzed or un-catalyzed and is distinct from other forms of depolymerization which may rely on the use of chemicals or biological action. This process is associated with an increase in entropy.

For most polymers, thermal depolymerization is a chaotic process, giving a mixture of volatile compounds. Materials may be depolymerized in this way during waste management, with the volatile components produced being burnt as a form of synthetic fuel in a waste-to-energy process. For other polymers, thermal depolymerization is an ordered process giving a single product, or limited range of products; these transformations are usually more valuable and form the basis of some plastic recycling technologies.

== Disordered depolymerization ==
For most polymeric materials, thermal depolymerization proceeds in a disordered manner, with random chain scission giving a mixture of volatile compounds. The result is broadly akin to pyrolysis, although at higher temperatures gasification takes place. These reactions can be seen during waste management, with the products being burnt as synthetic fuel in a waste-to-energy process. In comparison to simply incinerating the starting polymer, depolymerization gives a material with a higher heating value, which can be burnt more efficiently and may also be sold. Incineration can also produce harmful dioxins and dioxin-like compounds and requires specially designed reactors and emission control systems in order to be performed safely. As the depolymerization step requires heat, it is energy-consuming; thus, the ultimate balance of energy efficiency compared to straight incineration can be very tight and has been the subject of criticism.

=== Biomass ===
Many agricultural and animal wastes can be processed, but these are often already used as fertilizer, animal feed, and, in some cases, as feedstocks for paper mills or as low-quality boiler fuel. Thermal depolymerization can convert these into more economically valuable materials. Numerous biomass to liquid technologies have been developed. In general, biochemicals contain oxygen atoms, which are retained during pyrolysis, giving liquid products rich in phenols and furans. These can be viewed as partially oxidized and make for low-grade fuels. Hydrothermal liquefaction technologies dehydrate the biomass during thermal processing to produce a more energy-rich product stream. Similarly, gasification produces hydrogen, a very high-energy fuel.

=== Plastics ===
Plastic waste consists mostly of commodity plastics and may be actively sorted from municipal waste. Pyrolysis of mixed plastics can give a fairly broad mix of chemical products (between about 1 and 15 carbon atoms), including gases and aromatic liquids. Catalysts can give a better-defined product with a higher value. Likewise, hydrocracking can be employed to give LPG products. The presence of PVC can be problematic, as its thermal depolymerization generates large amounts of HCl, which can corrode equipment and cause undesirable chlorination of the products. It must be either excluded or compensated for by installing dechlorination technologies. Polyethylene and polypropylene account for just less than half of global plastic production and, being pure hydrocarbons, have a higher potential for conversion to fuel. Plastic-to-fuel technologies have historically struggled to be economically viable due to the costs of collecting and sorting the plastic and the relatively low value of the fuel produced. Large plants are seen as being more economical than smaller ones, but require more investment to build.

The method can, however, result in a mild net-decrease in greenhouse gas emissions, though other studies dispute this. For example, a 2020 study released by Renolds on their own Hefty EnergyBag program shows net greenhouse gas emissions. The study showed then when all cradle-to-grave energy costs are tallied, burning in a cement kiln was far superior. Cement kiln fuel scored a −61.1 kg CO_{2} equivalents compared to +905 kg CO_{2} eq. It also fared far worse in terms of landfill reduction vs. kiln fuel. Other studies have confirmed that plastics pyrolysis to fuel programs are also more energy intensive.

For tire waste management, tire pyrolysis is also an option. Oil derived from tire rubber pyrolysis contains high sulfur content, which gives it high potential as a pollutant and requires hydrodesulfurization before use. The area faces legislative, economic, and marketing obstacles. In most cases, tires are simply incinerated as tire-derived fuel.

=== Municipal waste ===
Thermal treatment of municipal waste can involve the depolymerization of a very wide range of compounds, including plastics and biomass. Technologies can include simple incineration as well as pyrolysis, gasification, and plasma gasification. All of these are able to accommodate mixed and contaminated feedstocks. The main advantage is the reduction in volume of the waste, particularly in densely populated areas lacking suitable sites for new landfills. In many countries, incineration with energy recovery remains the most common method, with more advanced technologies being hindered by technical and cost hurdles.

== Ordered depolymerization ==
Some materials thermally decompose in an ordered manner to give a single or limited range of products. By virtue of being pure materials, they are usually more valuable than the mixtures produced by disordered thermal depolymerization. For plastics this is usually the starting monomer, and when this is recycled back into fresh polymer, it is called feedstock recycling. In practice, not all depolymerization reactions are completely efficient, and some competitive pyrolysis is often observed.

=== Biomass ===
Biorefineries convert low-value agricultural and animal waste into useful chemicals. The industrial production of furfural by the acid-catalyzed thermal treatment of hemicellulose has been in operation for over a century. Lignin has been the subject of significant research for the potential production of BTX and other aromatic compounds, although such processes have not yet been commercialized with any lasting success.

=== Plastics ===
Certain polymers like PTFE, Nylon 6, polystyrene, and PMMA undergo depolymerization to give their starting monomers. These can be converted back into new plastic, a process called chemical or feedstock recycling. In theory, this offers infinite recyclability, but it is also more expensive and has a higher carbon footprint than other forms of plastic recycling; however, in practice, this still yields an inferior product at higher energy costs than virgin polymer production in the real world because of contamination.

== Related processes ==
Although rarely employed presently, coal gasification has historically been performed on a large scale. Thermal depolymerization is similar to other processes which use superheated water as a major phase to produce fuels, such as direct hydrothermal liquefaction. These are distinct from processes using dry materials to depolymerize, such as pyrolysis. The term thermochemical conversion (TCC) has also been used for conversion of biomass to oils, using superheated water, although it is more usually applied to fuel production via pyrolysis. A demonstration plant due to start up in the Netherlands is said to be capable of processing 64 tons of biomass (dry basis) per day into oil. Thermal depolymerization differs in that it contains a hydrous process followed by an anhydrous cracking / distillation process.

Condensation polymers bearing cleavable groups such as esters and amides can also be completely depolymerized by hydrolysis or solvolysis; this can be a purely chemical process but may also be promoted by enzymes. Such technologies are less well developed than those of thermal depolymerization but have the potential for lower energy costs. Thus far, polyethylene terephthalate has been the most heavily studied polymer. It has been suggested that waste plastic could be converted into other valuable chemicals (not necessarily monomers) by microbial action, but such technology is still in its infancy.

== See also ==
- Thermal treatment
- Mechanical heat treatment
- Wet oxidation
- Staged reforming
