= Uranyl metaphosphate =

Identifiers
| CAS Number | 25734-76-3 |
| 3D model (JSmol) | Interactive image |
| ChemSpider | 25933972 |
| PubChem CID | 163192851 |
| CompTox Dashboard (EPA) | DTXSID701260602 |
- InChI: InChI=1S/2HO3P.2O.U/c2*1-4(2)3;;;/h2*(H,1,2,3);;;/q;;;;+2/p-2 Key: YFRVLNOCPYUMID-UHFFFAOYSA-L
- SMILES: [O-]P(=O)=O.[O-]P(=O)=O.O=[U+2]=O

Properties
| Chemical formula | UP_{2}O_{8} |
| Molar mass | 427.971 g/mol |
- Except where otherwise noted, data are given for materials in their standard state (at 25 °C [77 °F], 100 kPa). Infobox references

Uranyl metaphosphate is a compound of uranium, phosphorus, and oxygen. It is one of the phosphates of uranium with the formula [UO_{2}(PO_{3})_{2}]_{n}. This long-chain compound is formed via the thermal decomposition of UO_{2}(H_{2}PO_{4})_{2}·3H_{2}O. Double salts, such as NaUO_{2}(PO_{3})_{3} and CsUO_{2}(PO_{3})_{3}, are known.

At elevated temperature, it decomposes to UP_{2}O_{7}, liberating oxygen.
