= Ewald Colliery =

Repurposed coal mine in Herten, Germany

Coordinates: 51°34′19″N 7°8′54″E

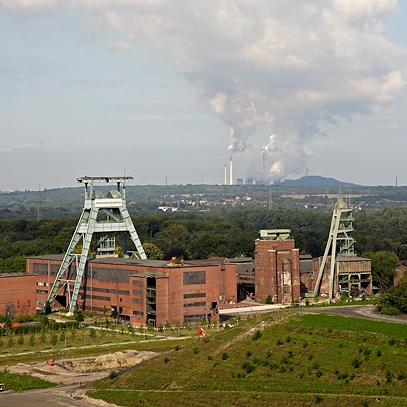
- View of the buildings and headframes of shafts 2 and 7 and the Malakow tower
- Industry: coal mining
- Founded: 1872
- Defunct: 2001
- Fate: Transformed into commercial space
- Headquarters: Herten, Germany
- Area served: Ruhr, North Rhine-Westphalia
- Products: coal

The Ewald Colliery (German: Zeche Ewald) is a disused coal mine in Herten, North Rhine-Westphalia, Germany. Established in 1872, it was one of several major mining sites in the heavily industrialized Ruhr district in northwestern Germany during the late nineteenth and twentieth centuries. The site eventually ceased operations as a mine in 2001 and has since been converted to commercial space.

== History ==
The sinking work for Shaft 1 (Hilger) began in 1872. In 1876 a minable deposit of coal was opened at a depth of 464 m and production began in 1877. The first few years were not very successful; faults in the area of the shaft required deeper sinking. By 1884 the shaft had become the deepest in the Ruhr area at 624 m. Ewaldstrasse was eventually built on the other side of the Malakow tower from shaft 1, but he plans for the mine site changed and so the lettering on the tower ended up being placed on the wrong side to be visible to travelers on the road. At the time colliery was located far from other developments, and due to the lack of manpower, only daring individuals could be recruited to work underground.

Shaft 2 was ready for extraction in 1892, and sinking work began in 1888. The Ewald 3/4 mine shafts followed in Gelsenkirchen-Resse in 1895. A fifth shaft was sunk in the Katzenbusch. In 1911, shaft 6, which went into operation as early as 1912, was excavated 600 m southeast of shaft 3/4. During the Second World War, the extraction requirements increased so that the sinking work for a central extraction shaft (shaft 7) was started. The above-day expansion of the shaft did not take place until 1949, when the shaft received a double-headed headframe. A breakthrough to the Ewald 3/4 mine followed. In 1969 the mine became the RAG Aktiongesellschaft and united with the Recklinghausen colliery.

A mine gas extraction system was operated on shaft system 3/4. The compressed gas was fed to the specially built motor-driven thermal power station owned by Stadtwerke Gelsenkirchen and used to generate electricity and heat.

In 1989 the Ewald Colliery was merged with the Schlägel & Eisen Colliery, and in 1997 with the Hugo Colliery. For a short time the consolidated Ewald/Hugo mine had 21 shafts. The political decision to give up the Ewald colliery, however, was made, and so on March 28, 2000, the last shift was run. The final shutdown followed in spring 2001.

The Hoppenbruch Heap adjoins the site. Together with the Hoheward dump, it forms the largest dump landscape in Europe with approx 220 hectares—the largest dump site in Europe. Large parts of the colliery have meanwhile been demolished, but the Malakow tower above shaft 1, the steel box strut frame above shaft 2 and the double headframe on the former shaft 7 still exist.

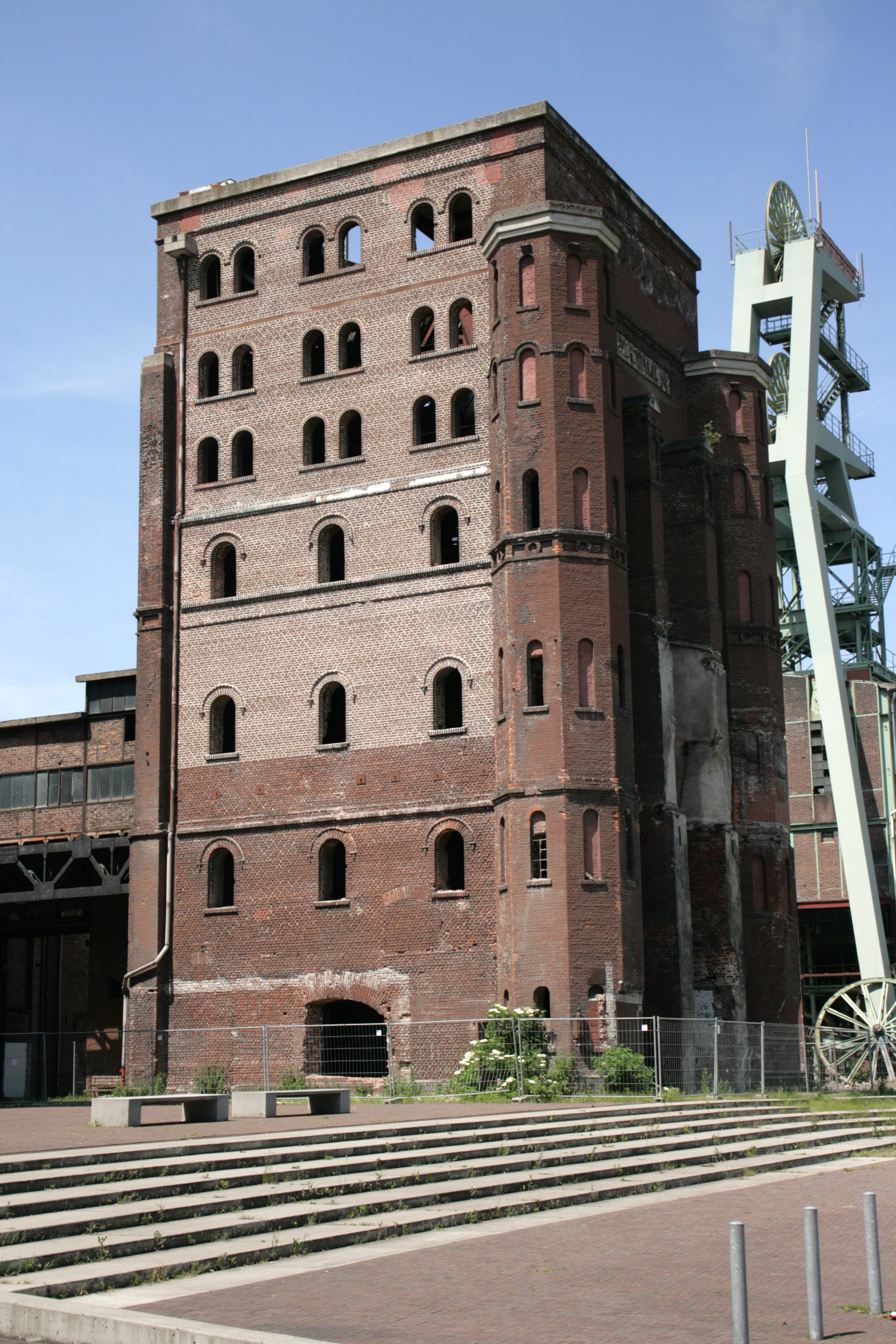
Malakow Tower over Shaft 1

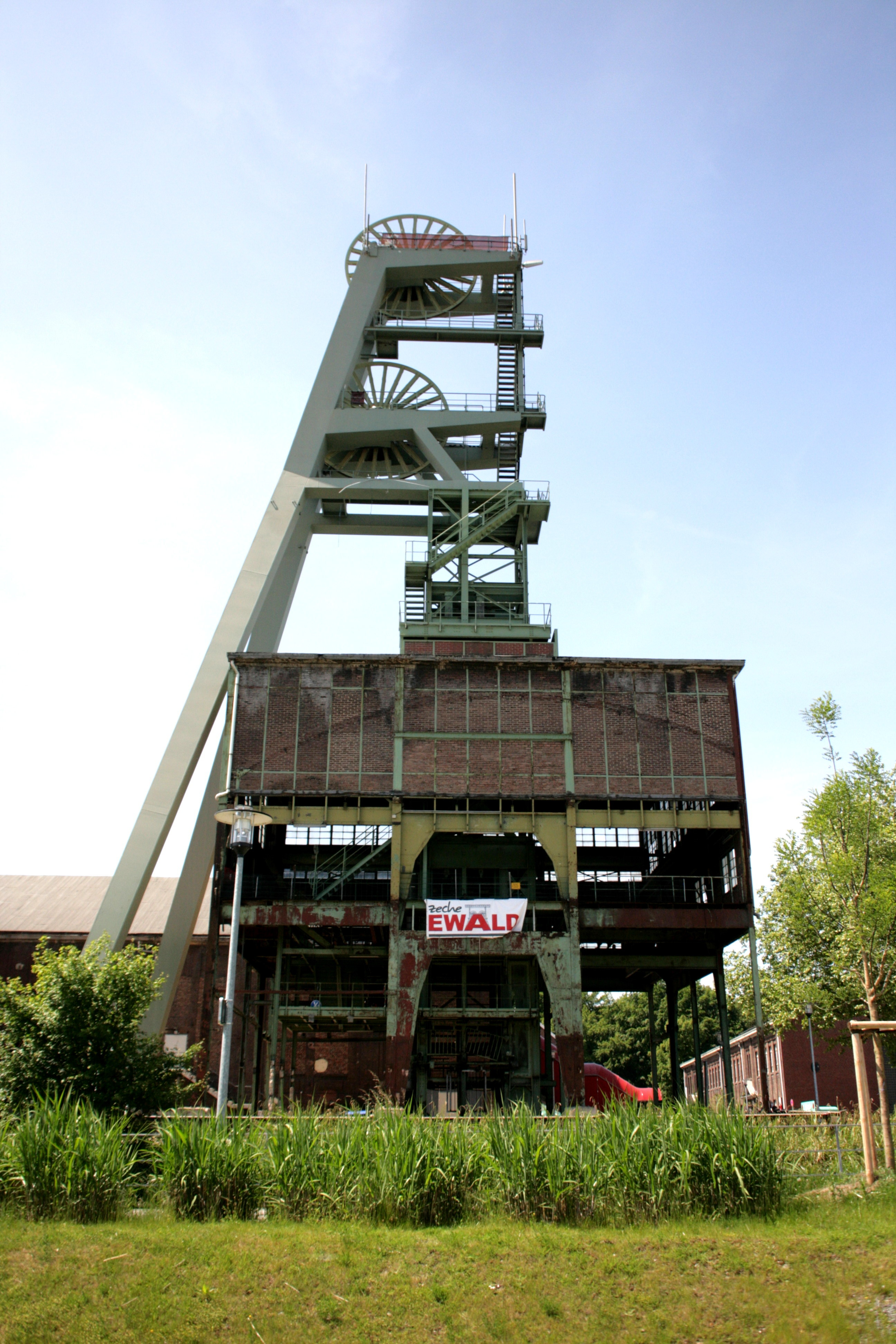
Shaft 2

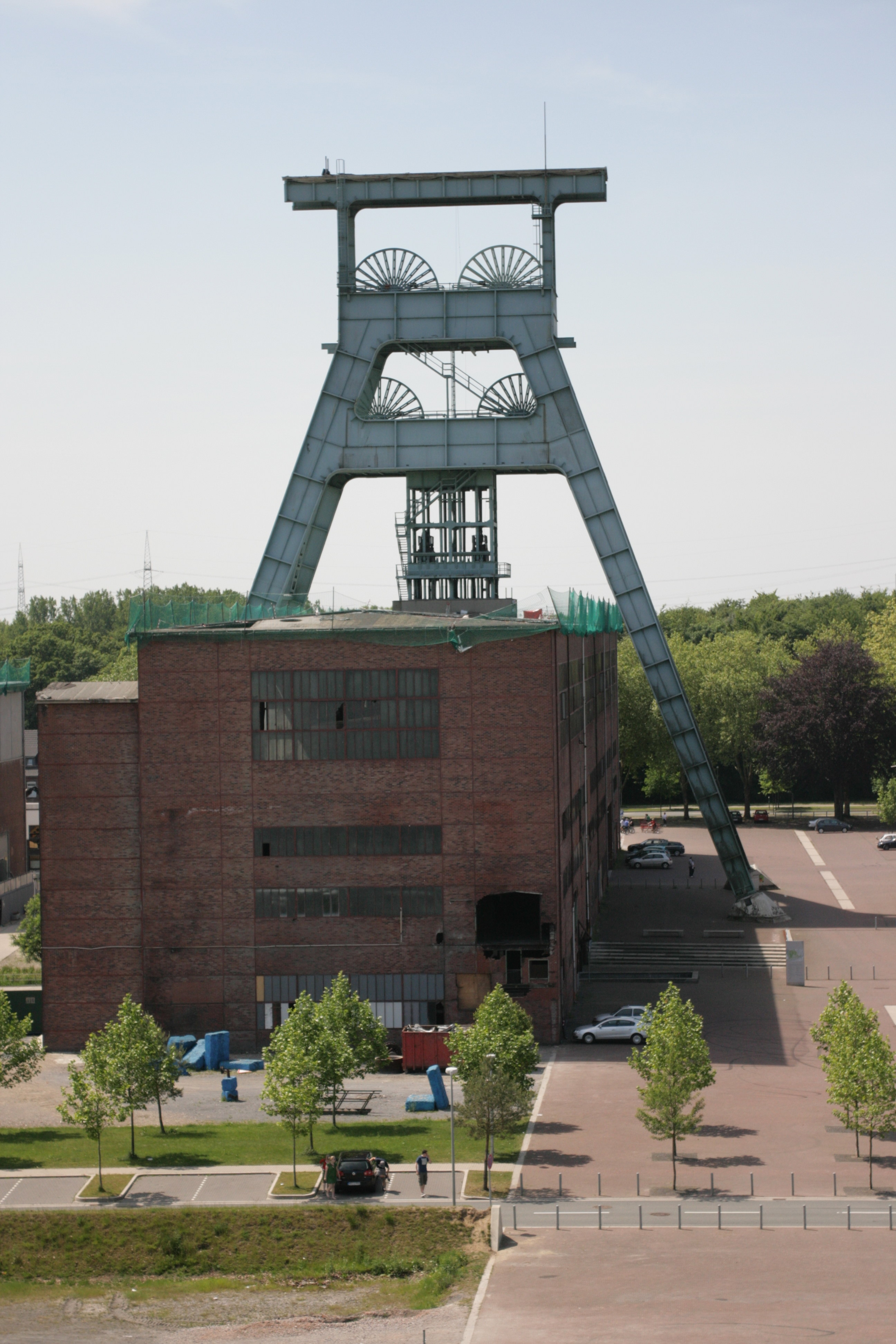
Double headframe over Shaft 7

== Readaptation ==
In order to compensate for the loss of jobs and economic power associated with the closure of the mine as soon as possible, RAG Mountain Immobilien GmbH (formerly Mountain-Grundstücksgesellschaft mbH (MGG)), together with the city of Herten, founded "Project group Ewald" in 1999, while the mine was still in operation. The aim was the economic revitalization of the approximately 52-hectare area and the creation of at least 1,000 new jobs.

The two project partners decided in favor of the “service provider” concept when planning the subsequent use. It provides for the areas of service, education, small-scale and large-scale business including a marketplace as a meeting point for the newly settled entrepreneurs and their customers. The redesign of the area is based on a 2002 design by the architects Cino Zucchi, Martin Halfmann and Peter Köster. The defining element of the redesign is the historical layer with some listed colliery buildings and the old shaft frames, which are visible from afar as “lighthouses.” This area is via a system of squares and paths with the newly designed Ewald connected promenade, which extends from south to north parallel to the naturally designed drainage canal, called familiarly "the Blue Ribbon," over the entire site. The integration of the site into the 750-hectare Hoheward landscape park (formerly the Emscherbruch landscape park) was also taken into account in the design.

== Present State ==
More than 60 percent of the site, which has been extensively rehabilitated and freed from contaminated sites, has been marketed since 2002. In 2007 the 18 hectares of logistics space were sold to international companies. 70 percent of the listed existing buildings have also already been marketed. The Hydrogen Competence Center H2Herten is being built on the northern part of the Ewald site. The first settlements are the companies IdaTech Fuel Cells GmbH and Masterflex GmbH. At the beginning of 2009, the construction of the “Blue Tower” began, which will be a demonstration plant using the staged reforming process to produce the hydrogen-rich substitute natural gas from biomasswins and should deliver 13 megawatts in the final stage. In October 2009, a visitor center was opened where one can explore new uses of hydrogen as an energy carrier and fuel cell technology. As a further energy-efficient venture, a wind power electrolysis is being built with funds from the state of North Rhine-Westphalia, which will supply the user center with "green" hydrogen from wind power. In addition, the Herten tourist office opened in 2010 in the former wages and lighting hall. The relocation to the site of more than 20 new companies has created 1,000 new jobs within a decade of the closure of the Ewald mine.

The Ewald project has established itself as an event location for several years. It has already served three times as the hub of the renowned "Extraschicht", the night of industrial culture, and hosted events such as the T-COM mountain bike event in May 2007. In October 2009, the theater entrepreneur Christian Stratmann opened the RevuePalast Ruhr in the former heating center as Travesty Theater for shows and guest performances. The ARD Sportschau Club has been broadcast from the underground bar there since 2013. The Kustom Kulture Forever (formerly Bottrop Kustom Kulture), one of the largest Kustom Kulture shows in Europe, has been held on the site since 2013. Since 2016 it has been affiliated with the Kustom Kulture Tattoo Show.

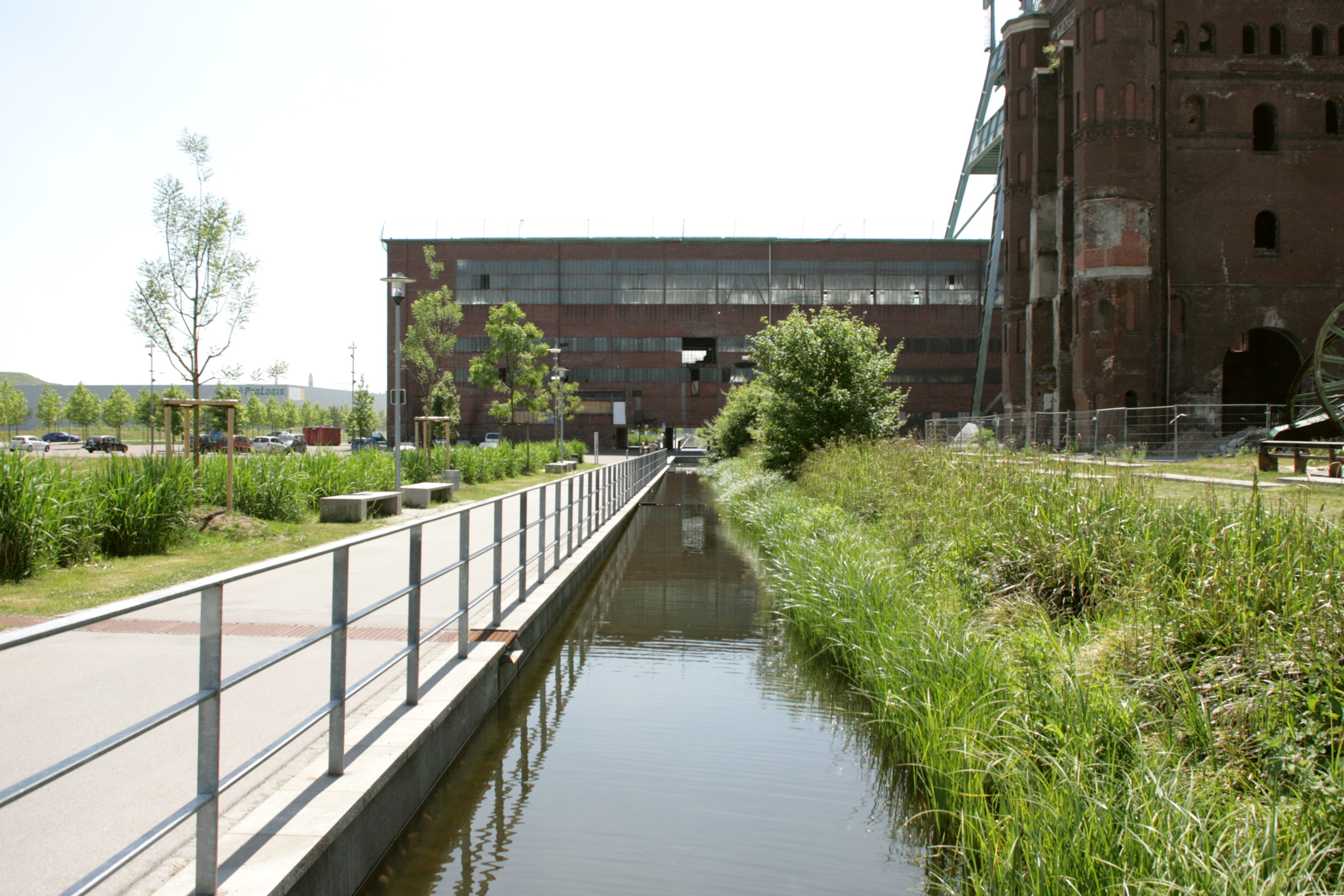
Ewald Promenade

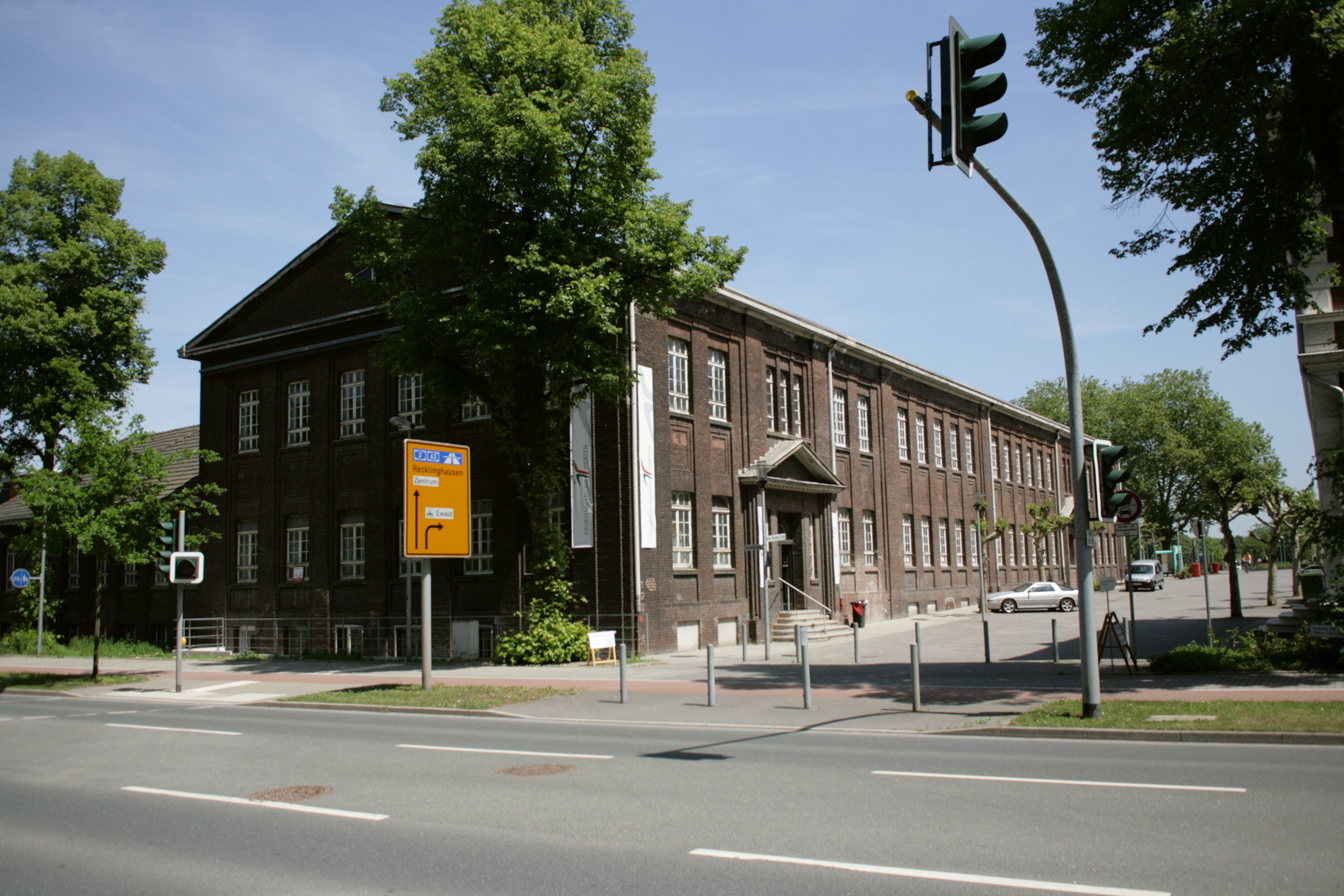
The RVR visitor center in Herten on the mine grounds

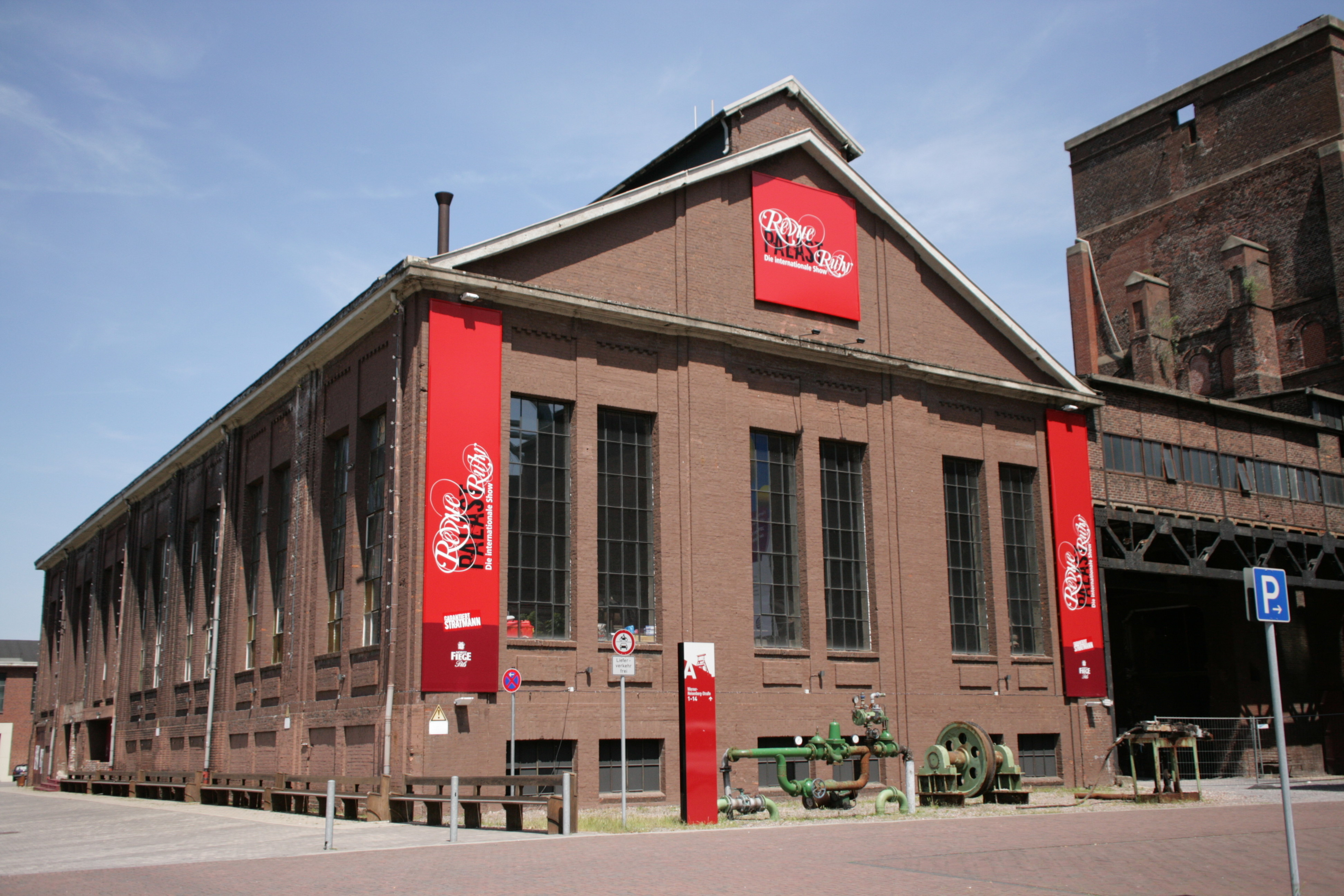
RevuePalast Ruhr on the colliery site

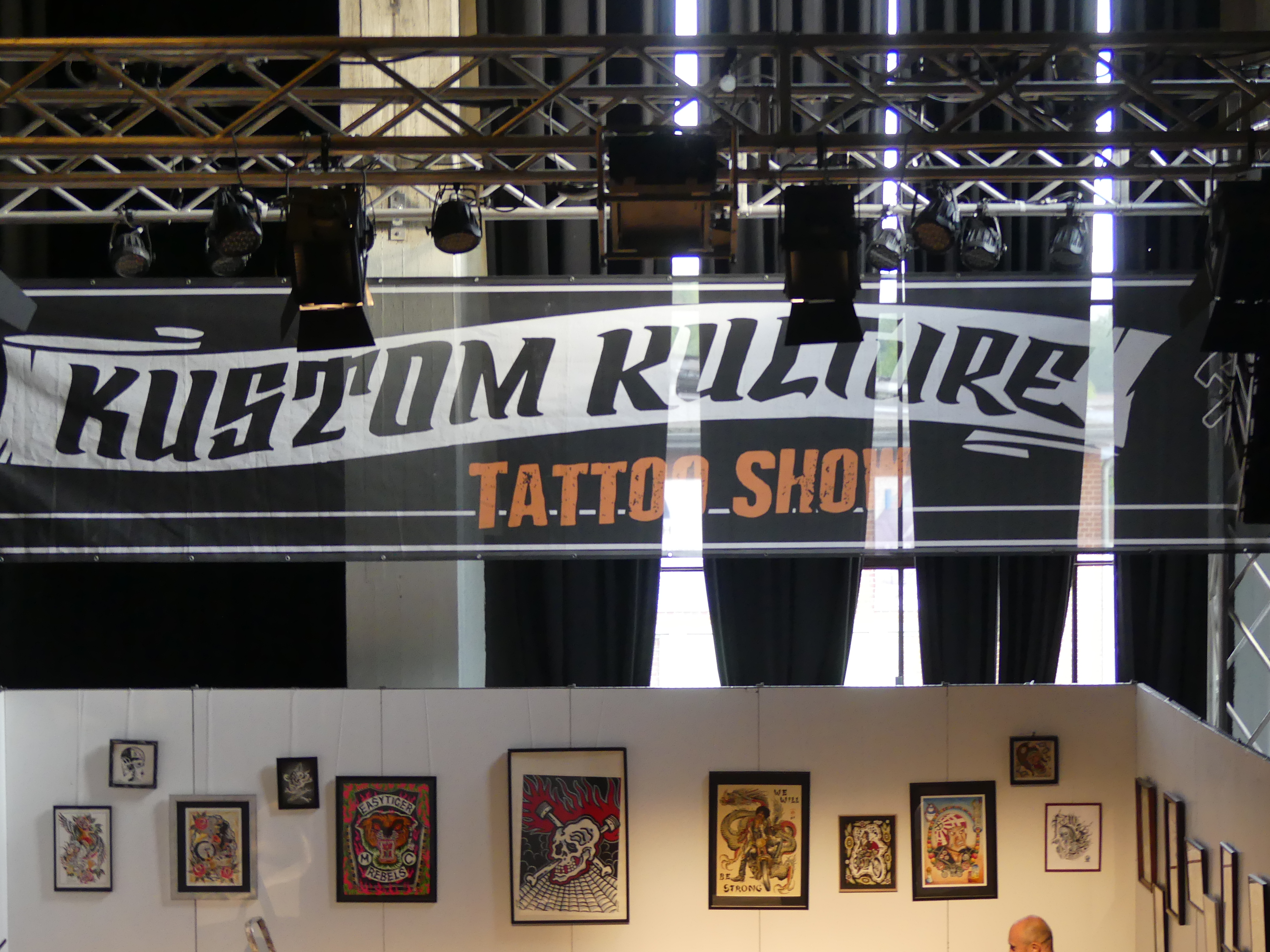
Stage of the Kustom Kulture Tattoo Show 2019

== Bibliography ==
- Wilhelm Hermann, Gertrude Hermann: Die alten Zechen an der Ruhr 6th revised edition. (Königstein im Taunus: Verlag Karl Robert Langewiesche, Nachfolger Hans Köster KG, 2006). ISBN 3784569943
- Wolfgang Quickels, Sibylle Raudies, and Eberhard Scholz, Es war, es wird. Die Zeche Ewald von 1871 bis 2010 in Geschichte/n und Bildern (Recklinghausen: RDN Verlags GmbH & Co. KG Stefan Prott, 2007). ISBN 3-9810120-3-8
- Joachim Huske, Die Steinkohlenzechen im Ruhrrevier. 3rd edition. (Bochum: Selbstverlag des Deutschen Bergbau-Museums, 2006). ISBN 3-937203-24-9
