= Dry distillation =

Heating of solids to produce gases

Derivation of a wood-tar creosote from resinous woods

Dry distillation is the heating of solid materials to produce gaseous products (which may condense into liquids or solids). The method may involve pyrolysis or thermolysis, or it may not (for instance, a simple mixture of ice and glass could be separated without breaking any chemical bonds, but organic matter contains a greater diversity of molecules, some of which are likely to break).

If there are no chemical changes, just phase changes, it resembles classical distillation, although it will generally need higher temperatures. Dry distillation in which chemical changes occur is a type of destructive distillation or cracking.

== Uses ==
The method has been used to obtain liquid fuels from coal and wood. It can also be used to break down mineral salts such as sulfates (SO_{4}^{2-}) through thermolysis, in this case producing sulfur dioxide (SO_{2}) or sulfur trioxide (SO_{3}) gas which can be dissolved in water to obtain sulfuric acid. By this method sulfuric acid was first identified and artificially produced. When substances of vegetable origin, e.g. coal, oil shale, peat or wood, are heated in the absence of air (dry distillation), they decompose into gas, liquid products and coke/charcoal. The yield and chemical nature of the decomposition products depend on the nature of the raw material and the conditions under which the dry distillation is done. Decomposition within a temperature range of 450 °C to about 600 °C is called carbonization or low-temperature degassing. At temperatures above 900 °C, the process is called coking or high-temperature degassing. If coal is gasified to make coal gas or carbonized to make coke then coal tar is among the by-products.

=== Wood ===
When wood is heated above 270 °C it begins to carbonize. If air is absent, the final product (since there is no oxygen present to react with the wood) is charcoal. If air (which contains oxygen) is present, the wood will catch fire and burn when it reaches a temperature of about 400–500 °C and the fuel product is wood ash. If wood is heated away from air, first the moisture is driven off. Until this is complete, the wood temperature remains at about 100–110 °C. When the wood is dry its temperature rises, and at about 270 °C, it begins to spontaneously decompose. This is the well known exothermic reaction which takes place in charcoal burning. At this stage evolution of the by-products of wood carbonization starts. These substances are given off gradually as the temperature rises and at about 450 °C the evolution is complete. The solid residue, charcoal, is mainly carbon (about 70 %) and small amounts of tarry substances which can be driven off or decomposed completely only by raising the temperature to above about 600 °C.

In the common practice of charcoal burning using internal heating of the charged wood by burning a part of it, all the by-product vapors and gases escape into the atmosphere as smoke. The by-products can be recovered by passing the off-gases through a series of water to yield so-called wood vinegar (pyroligneous acid) and the non-condensible wood gas passes on through the condenser and may be burned to provide heat. The wood gas is only usable as fuel, and consists typically of 17 % methane; 2 % hydrogen; 23 % carbon monoxide; 38 % carbon dioxide; 2 % oxygen and 18 % nitrogen. It has a gas calorific value of about 10.8 MJ/m^{3} (290 BTU/cu.ft.) i.e. about one third the value of natural gas. When deciduous tree woods are subjected to distillation, the products are methanol (wood alcohol) and charcoal. The distillation of pine wood causes Pine tar and pitch to drip away from the wood and leave behind charcoal. Birch tar from birch bark is a particularly fine tar, known as "Russian oil", suitable for leather protection. The by-products of wood tar are turpentine and charcoal.

Tar kilns are dry distillation ovens, historically used in Scandinavia for producing tar from wood. They were built close to the forest, from limestone or from more primitive holes in the ground. The bottom is sloped into an outlet hole to allow the tar to pour out. The wood is split into dimensions of a finger, stacked densely, and finally covered tight with dirt and moss. If oxygen can enter, the wood might catch fire, and the production would be ruined. On top of this, a fire is stacked and lit. After a few hours, the tar starts to pour out and continues to do so for a few days.

== See also ==
- Coal oil
- Destructive distillation
- Gasworks
- Pitch (resin)
- Syngas
- Tar
