= Powdered activated carbon treatment =

Wastewater treatment technique

Powdered Activated Carbon Treatment (PACT) is a wastewater technology in which powdered activated carbon is added to an anaerobic or aerobic treatment system. The carbon in the biological treatment process adsorbs recalcitrant compounds that are not readily biodegradable, thereby reducing the chemical oxygen demand of the wastewater and removing toxins. The carbon also acts as a "buffer" against the effects of toxic organics in the wastewater.

In such a system, biological treatment and carbon adsorption are combined into a single, synergistic treatment step. The result is a system which offers significant cost reduction compared to activated sludge and granular carbon treatment options. The addition of the powdered activated carbon stabilizes biological systems against upsets and shock loading, controls color and odor, and may reduce disposal costs while removing soluble organics.

== System Description ==
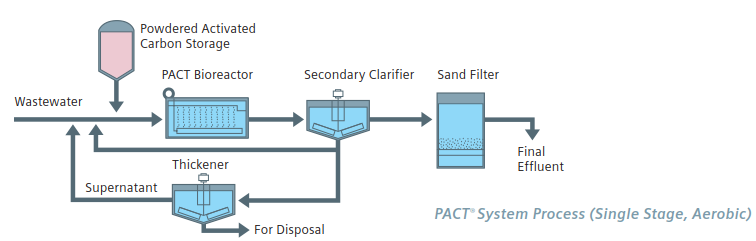
Powdered Activated Carbon Treatment Process Flow Diagram

In an aerobic treatment system, influent first enters an aeration tank where the powdered carbon is added, making up a portion of mixed liquor suspended solids. Once the aeration is completed, the treated wastewater and the carbon-biomass slurry are allowed to settle. In cases where complete solids separation is needed, such as for reuse, an MBR may be used in place of the clarifer.

Following treatment, a portion of the carbon and biomass slurry is wasted to solids handling. Due to the presence of the powdered activated carbon, the sludge settles, thickens, and dewaters better compared to conventional activated sludge processes. These solids can be wasted and disposed of as a slurry, dewatered to a compact, stable cake, or pumped as a slurry to a wet air oxidation unit for further processing to regenerate the carbon and destroy the biological solids.

== Commercial Applications ==
The system as it exists today was developed in the 1970s under a collaborative effort between DuPont and Zimpro. PACT systems can be used to treat very difficult to treat wastewaters including

- refinery, petrochemical, pharmaceutical, chemical, textile/dye and other industrial wastewaters
- landfill leachate
- highly contaminated surface water or groundwater.

Powdered activated carbon is also used in the processing of drinking water at treatment facilities, primarily on a seasonal basis in order to deal with aesthetic problems with the water such as odor and taste issues associated with Geosmin and 2-MIB.

Today there are over 100 PACT systems worldwide. Some of these installations have been retrofits to existing conventional activated sludge processes to meet more stringent effluent requirements. Several PACT systems have been built in China in recent years as a result of higher treatment regulations for difficult-to-treat industrial wastewaters. PACT systems have also been used to meet bioassay and toxicity requirements as well as allow for water reuse.

== See also ==
- Wet oxidation
- Fred Zimmermann
- Water purification
- Activated sludge
- list of waste water treatment technologies
