= Plasma gasification =

Process to convert organic matter into gas

Plasma Arc gasification
- Process type: Chemical
- Industrial sector(s): Waste management Energy
- Main technologies or sub-processes: Plasma arc Plasma electrolysis
- Feedstock: Municipal and industrial waste Biomass; Solid hydrocarbons
- Product(s): Syngas; Slag; Separated metal scrap

Plasma gasification is a thermal process that converts organic matter into a syngas (synthesis gas) which is primarily made up of hydrogen and carbon monoxide. A plasma torch powered by an electric arc ionizes gas and transforms organic matter into syngas, producing slag as a byproduct. It is used commercially as a form of waste treatment. It has been tested for the gasification of refuse-derived fuel, biomass, industrial waste, hazardous waste, and solid hydrocarbons, such as coal, oil sands, petcoke, and oil shale.

== Process ==
A plasma torch passes strong electric current under high voltage between two electrodes as an electric arc. Pressurized gas is ionized passing through the plasma created by the arc. The torch's temperature ranges from 2,000 to 14,000 °C (3,600 to 25,200 °F). The temperature determines the structure of the plasma and forming gas.

The waste is heated, melted and finally vaporized. At these conditions molecular dissociation occurs by breaking apart molecular bonds. Complex molecules are separated into individual atoms. The resulting elemental components are in a gaseous phase (syngas). Molecular dissociation using plasma is referred to as "plasma pyrolysis."

== Materials ==
Smaller torches typically use an inert gas such as argon, while larger sizes require nitrogen. Electrodes vary from copper or tungsten to hafnium or zirconium, along with other alloys.

=== Feedstocks ===
Feedstocks are most often refuse-derived fuel, biomass waste, both or biomedical waste and hazardous materials. The content and consistency of the waste directly impacts performance. Extracting treatable material improves consistency. Too much inorganic material such as metal and construction waste increases slag production, while decreasing syngas production. However, the slag is chemically inert and safe to handle. Shredding waste to create uniform particles is generally required. This creates an efficient transfer of energy which breaks down the material.

Added steam supports steam reforming.

=== Yields ===
Pure synthesis gas consists predominantly of carbon monoxide (CO) and hydrogen (H_{2}). Inorganic compounds in the waste stream melt, including glass, ceramics, and metals.

The temperature and lack of oxygen prevents the formation of many toxic compounds such as furans, dioxins, nitrogen oxides, or sulfur dioxide in the flame. However, dioxins form during cooling.

Metals can be recovered from the slag and sold. Inert slag produced from some processes is granulated and can be used in construction. A portion of the syngas feeds on-site turbines, which powers the plasma torches and thus supports the feed system.

=== Equipment ===
Some plasma gasification reactors operate at negative pressure, although most attempt to recover gaseous and/or solid resources.

== Advantages ==
The main advantages of plasma torch technologies for waste treatment are:

- Preventing hazardous waste from reaching landfills
- Some processes are designed to recover fly ash, bottom ash, and most other particulates, for 95% or better diversion from landfills, and no harmful emissions of toxic waste
- Potential production of vitrified slag which could be used as construction material
- Processing of biomass waste into combustible syngas for electric power and heat or for synthesis into fuels or chemicals.
- Production of value-added products (metals) from slag
- Safe means to destroy both medical and many other hazardous wastes.
- Gasification with starved combustion and rapid quenching of syngas from elevated temperatures can avoid the production of dioxins and furans that are common to incinerators
- Air emissions can be cleaner than landfills and similar to that of incinerators.

== Disadvantages ==
Main disadvantages of plasma torch technologies for waste treatment are:

- Large initial investment costs relative to that of alternatives, including landfill and incineration.
- Operational costs are high relative to that of incineration.
- Wet feed stock reduces syngas production and increases energy consumption.
- Little or negative net energy production when taking into account all energy inputs.
- Frequent maintenance and limited plant availability.

== Commercialization ==
Plasma torch gasification is used commercially for waste disposal at five sites worldwide with a combined design capacity of 200 tonnes of waste per day, half of which is biomass waste.

Energy recovery from waste streams using plasma gasification is used in one or two installations treating 25–30 tonnes per day.

== Military use ==
The US Navy employs the Plasma Arc Waste Destruction System (PAWDS) on its latest generation Gerald R. Ford-class aircraft carrier. The compact system treats all combustible solid waste.

== See also ==
- Gasification
- Staged reforming
- Waste management
- Waste to energy
- Northeast of England Process Industry Cluster NEPIC
