= Staged reforming =

Staged reforming is a thermochemical process to convert organic material or bio waste such as wood, dung or hay into combustible gases containing methane, carbon monoxide and hydrogen. The single-stage reforming of bio materials results in high dust and tar yields in the produced gas restricting its use, hence the use of staged reforming. After reforming the output is approximately 80% fuel gas and 20% cokes.

In staged reforming technology, gas conversion is a separate stage after pyrolysis.

== First stage ==
Organic material is decomposed into gas and coal at approximately 600°C.

== Second stage ==
Gas produced by the first stage is reformed with water vapor and heat energy from the cokes into a dust and residue-free fuel gas.

Second stage process steps:

- Heating in the pre-heater at 1050°C.
- Cooldown in the reformer by chemical reaction at 750°C
- Further cooling to 550°C by heating the cold cokes by using cold mix
- Re-heating to 1050°C

== See also ==
- Plasma arc waste disposal
- Thermochemical conversion
