= Wet oxidation =

Form of hydrothermal treatment

Wet oxidation is a form of hydrothermal treatment. It is the oxidation of dissolved or suspended components in water using oxygen as the oxidizer. It is referred to as wet air oxidation (WAO) when air is used. The oxidation reactions occur in superheated water at a temperature above the normal boiling point of water (100 °C), but below the critical point (374 °C).

The system must be maintained under pressure to avoid excessive evaporation of water. This is done to control energy consumption due to the latent heat of vaporization. It is also done because liquid water is necessary for most of the oxidation reactions to occur. Compounds oxidize under wet oxidation conditions that would not oxidize under dry conditions at the same temperature and pressure.

Wet oxidation has been used commercially for around 60 years. It is used predominantly for treating wastewater. It is often referred to as Zimpro (from ZIMmerman PROcess), after Fred J. Zimmermann who commercialized it in the mid 20th century.

== System Description ==
Commercial systems typically use a bubble column reactor, where air is bubbled through a vertical column that is liquid full of the hot and pressurized wastewater. Fresh wastewater enters the bottom of the column and oxidized wastewater exits the top. The heat released during the oxidation is used to maintain the operating temperature.

WAO is a liquid phase reaction using dissolved oxygen in water to oxidize wastewater contaminants. The dissolved oxygen is typically supplied using pressurized air, but pure oxygen can also be used. The oxidation reaction generally occurs at moderate temperatures of 150°-320 °C and at pressures from 10 to 220 bar. The process converts organic contaminants to carbon dioxide, water, and biodegradable short chain organic acids. Inorganic constituents such as sulfides and cyanides are converted to non-reactive inorganic compounds.

In the WAO reaction, complex organic molecules, including biological refractory compounds, are broken into simpler organic compounds or to a complete mineralized state (CO_{2}, NH_{3}, Cl^{−}, SO_{4}^{−2}, PO_{4}^{−3})^{.} Simple organic compounds such as low molecular weight carboxylic acids and mineralized reaction products may be present in the WAO effluents. Because of this, the WAO effluent generally requires post treatment prior to discharge. WAO effluents are typically readily biodegradable and exhibit high values for BOD:COD ratios. Standard treatment techniques such as activated sludge biotreatment are typically used with WAO for complete treatment.

Catalyst can be used in the WAO system to enhance treatment and achieve a higher COD destruction. Heterogeneous and homogenous catalysts have been used. Heterogeneous catalysts are based on precious metals deposited on a stable substrate. Homogenous catalysts are dissolved transition metals. Several processes, such as Ciba-Geigy, LOPROX, and ATHOS utilize a homogenous catalyst. Mixed metal catalysts, such a Ce/Mn, Co/Ce, Ag/Ce, have also been effective in improving the treatment achieved in a WAO system.

A special type of wet oxidation process was the so-called "VerTech process" system. A system of this type operated in Apeldoorn, Netherlands between 1994 and 2004. The system was installed in a below-ground pressure vessel (also called a gravity pressure vessel or GPV). The pressure was supplied by feeding the material to a reactor with a depth of 1,200 metres (3,900 ft). The deep shaft reactor also served as a heat exchanger, so no pre-heating was required. The operating temperature was about 270 °C with a pressure of about 100 bars (1,500 psi). The installation was eventually shut down due to operational problems.

== Commercial Applications ==
=== Spent Caustic Treatment ===
The majority of commercial wet oxidation systems are used to treat industrial wastewater, such as sulfide laden spent caustic streams from ethylene and LPG production as well as naphthenic and cresylic spent caustics from refinery applications.

Classification	Temperature (Pressure)	Treatment of Compounds
Low	110-150 °C (2-10 bar)	Reactive Sulfides
Mid	200-220 °C (20-45 bar)	Sulfides, Mercaptans
High	240-260 °C (45-100 bar)	Naphthenic and Cresylic Acids, Sulfides, Mercaptans

Typical classification of WAO treatment systems.

Low temperature WAO systems oxidize sulfides to thiosulfate and sulfate but high concentrations of thiosulfate are present in the treated effluent. The mid temperature systems fully oxidize sulfides to sulfate and mercaptans are oxidized to sulfonic acids. For sulfidic spent caustics, this results in a high chemical oxygen demand (COD) destruction (>90%). High temperature systems are used to oxidize organic compounds that are present in naphthenic and cresylic spent caustics.

=== Sewage Sludge Treatment ===
Almost as many systems are also used for treating biosolids, in order to pasteurize and to decrease volume of material for disposal. The thermal conditioning occurs at temperatures of 210 – 240 °C. A 4% dry solid slurry can be processed in a WAO system where it is disinfected and the treated effluent can be dewatered to 55% dry solids using a filter press.

=== Other Applications ===
Wet air oxidation has also been used to treat a variety of other industrial process waters and wastewaters which include:

· Hazardous Waste

· Kinetic Hydrate Inhibitors (KHI) from produced water

· Polyol ether/styrene monomer (POSM) wastewater

· Ammonium sulfate crystallizer mother liquor

· Pharmaceutical wastewater

· Cyanide Wastewater

· Powdered Activated Carbon regeneration

== See also ==
- Supercritical water oxidation
- Incineration
- List of waste-water treatment technologies
- Powdered activated carbon treatment
