= Pyrolysis =

Thermal decomposition of materials

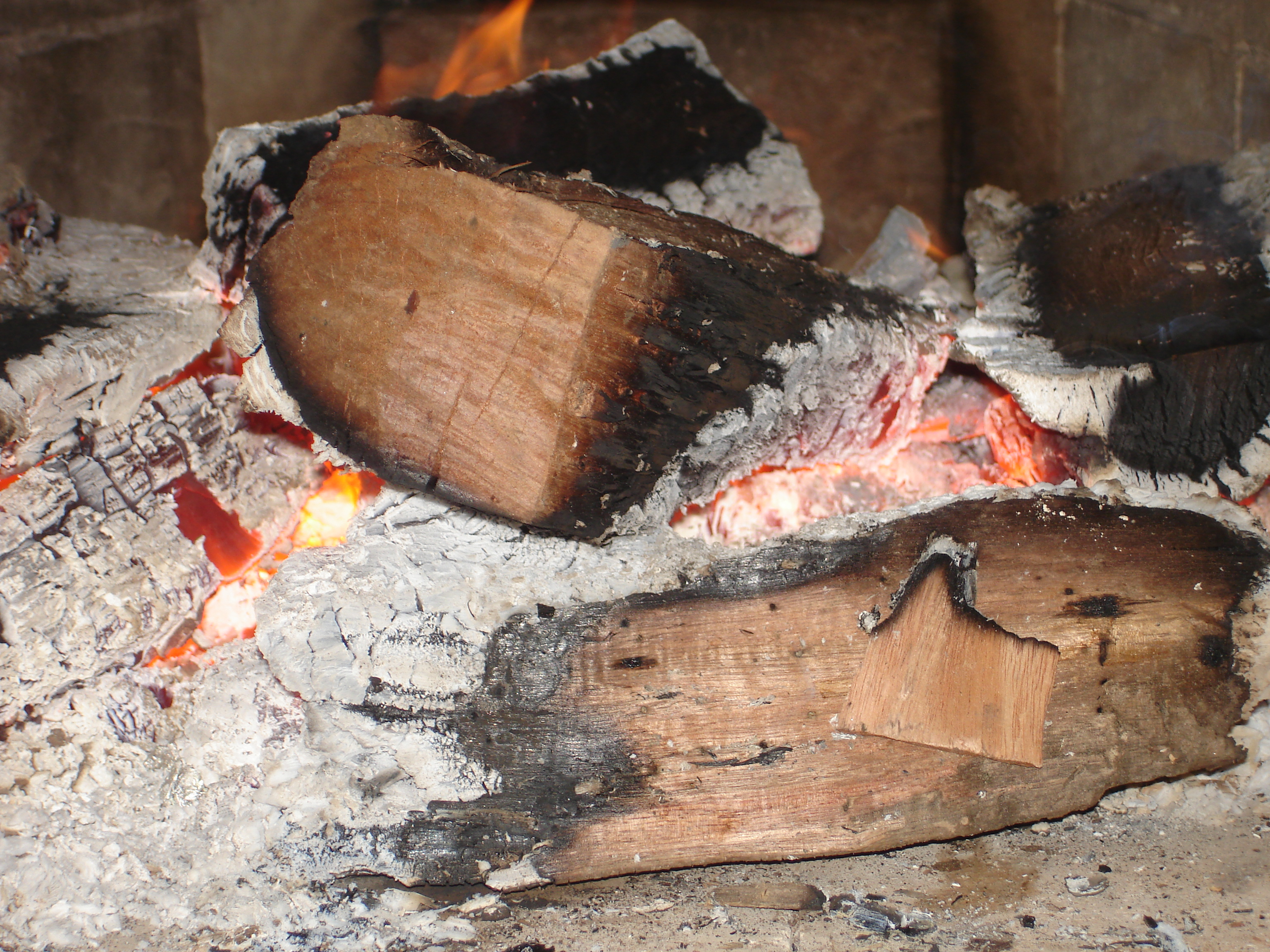
Burning pieces of wood, showing various stages of pyrolysis, followed by oxidative combustion

Pyrolysis (/paɪˈrɒlɪsɪs/; from Ancient Greek πῦρ (pûr) 'fire' and λύσις (lúsis) 'separation') is a process involving the separation of covalent bonds in organic matter by thermal decomposition within an inert environment without oxygen.

== Applications ==
Pyrolysis is most commonly used in the treatment of organic materials. It is one of the processes involved in the charring of wood. In general, pyrolysis of organic substances produces volatile products and leaves char, a carbon-rich solid residue. Extreme pyrolysis, which leaves mostly carbon as the residue, is called carbonization. Pyrolysis is considered one of the steps in the processes of gasification or combustion. Compared to syngas, pyrolysis gas has a high percentage of heavy tar fractions, which condense at relatively high temperatures, preventing its direct use in gas burners and internal combustion engines.

The process is used heavily in the chemical industry, for example, to produce ethylene, many forms of carbon, and other chemicals from petroleum, coal, and even wood, or to produce coke from coal. It is used also in the conversion of natural gas (primarily methane) into hydrogen gas and solid carbon char, recently introduced on an industrial scale. Aspirational applications of pyrolysis would convert biomass into syngas and biochar, waste plastics back into usable oil, or waste into safely disposable substances.

== Terminology ==
Pyrolysis is one of the various types of chemical degradation processes that occur at higher temperatures (above the boiling point of water or other solvents). It differs from other processes like combustion and hydrolysis in that it usually does not involve the addition of other reagents such as oxygen (O_{2}, in combustion) or water (in hydrolysis). Pyrolysis produces solids (char), condensable liquids (heavy and light oils, and tar), and non-condensable gasses.

Pyrolysis is different from gasification. In the chemical process industry, pyrolysis refers to a partial thermal degradation of carbonaceous materials that takes place in an inert (oxygen free) atmosphere and produces both gases, liquids and solids. The pyrolysis can be extended to full gasification that produces mainly gaseous output, often with the addition of e.g. water steam to gasify residual carbonic solids, see Steam reforming.

=== Types ===
Specific types of pyrolysis include:

- Carbonization, the complete pyrolysis of organic matter, which usually leaves a solid residue that consists mostly of elemental carbon.
- Methane pyrolysis, the direct conversion of methane to hydrogen fuel and separable solid carbon, sometimes using molten metal catalysts.
- Hydrous pyrolysis, in the presence of superheated water or steam, producing hydrogen and substantial atmospheric carbon dioxide.
- Dry distillation, as in the original production of sulfuric acid from sulfates.
- Destructive distillation, as in the manufacture of charcoal, coke and activated carbon.
  - Charcoal burning, the production of charcoal.
  - Tar production by destructive distillation of wood in tar kilns.
- Caramelization of sugars.
- High-temperature cooking processes such as roasting, frying, toasting, and grilling.
- Cracking of heavier hydrocarbons into lighter ones, as in oil refining.
- Thermal depolymerization, which breaks down plastics and other polymers into monomers and oligomers.
- Ceramization involving the formation of polymer derived ceramics from preceramic polymers under an inert atmosphere.
- Catagenesis, the natural conversion of buried organic matter to fossil fuels.
- Flash vacuum pyrolysis, used in organic synthesis.

Other pyrolysis types come from a different classification that focuses on the pyrolysis operating conditions and heating system used, which have an impact on the yield of the pyrolysis products.

Pyrolysis	Operating conditions	Pyrolysis product yield (wt%)
Slow low temperature pyrolysis	Temperature: 250–450 °C Vapor residence time: 10–100 min Heating rate: 0.1–1 °C/s Feedstock size: 5–50 mm	Bio-oil ~30 Biochar~35 Gases~35
Intermediate pyrolysis	Temperature: 600–800 °C Vapor residence time: 0.5–20 s Heating rate: 1.0–10 °C/s Feedstock size: 1–5 mm	Bio-oil~50 Biochar~25 Gases~35
Fast low temperature pyrolysis	Temperature: 250–450°C Vapor residence time: 0.5–5 s Heating rate: 10–200 °C/s Feedstock size: <3 mm	Bio-oil ~50 Biochar~20 Gases~30
Flash pyrolysis	Temperature: 800–1000 °C Vapor residence time: <5 s Heating rate: >1000 °C/s Feedstock size: <0.2 mm	Bio-oil ~75 Biochar~12 Gases~13
Hydro pyrolysis	Temperature: 350–600 °C Vapor residence time: >15 s Heating rate: 10–300 °C/s	Not assigned
High temperature pyrolysis	Temperature: 800–1150 °C Vapor residence time: 10–100 min Heating rate: 0.1–1 °C/s	Bio-oil ~43 Biochar~22 Gases~45

== History ==
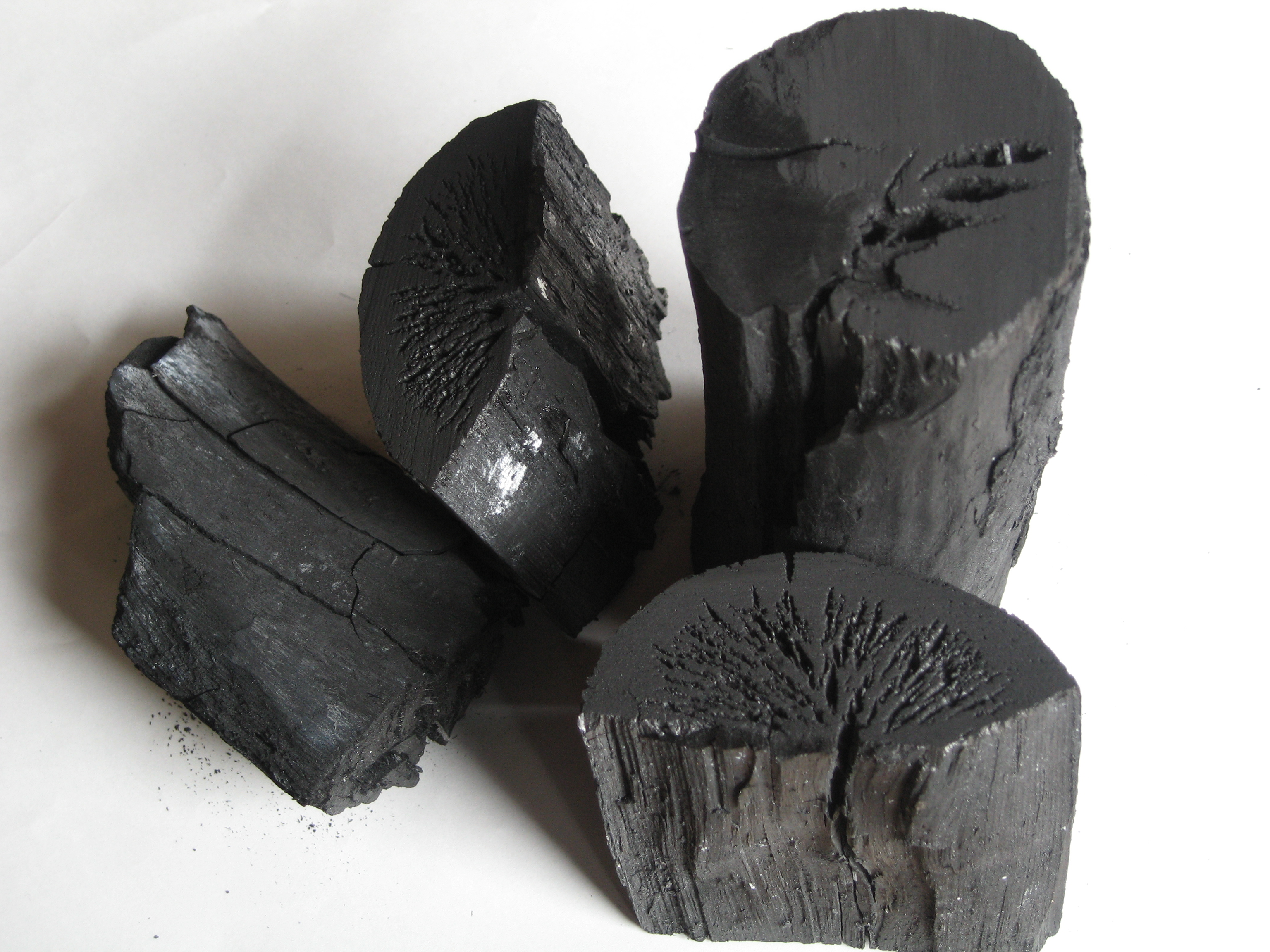
Oak charcoal

Pyrolysis has been used for turning wood into charcoal since ancient times. The ancient Egyptians used the liquid fraction obtained from the pyrolysis of cedar wood in their embalming process.

The dry distillation of wood remained the major source of methanol into the early 20th century. Pyrolysis was instrumental in the discovery of many chemical substances, such as phosphorus from ammonium sodium hydrogen phosphate NH_{4}NaHPO_{4} in concentrated urine, oxygen from mercuric oxide, and various nitrates.

=== Wood distillation components ===
Destructive distillation of resinous woods (like pine or cedar), where wood is heated in the absence of air, breaks it down into useful chemical components.

Primary thermal decomposition: When resinous woods undergo traditional pyrolysis, distillation forms three physical states:

- Gas: Volatile vapors often used for fuel.
- Charcoal: The solid carbon residue remaining in the kiln.
- Liquid distillate: The condensed vapors that form the basis for further refinement.

Separation of the liquid: The liquid distillate naturally separates (or is processed) into two distinct layers:

- Pyroligneous acid: An aqueous (water-based) layer containing acetic acid and methanol.
- Crude tar: A thick, dark, oily mixture that contains the heavier organic compounds.

Fractional distillation of crude tar: The crude tar is then further distilled based on density and boiling points to produce:

- Light oils (turpentine): Oils lighter than water that rise to the top.
- Pitch or tar: The heavy, nearly solid residue left at the bottom.
- Heavy oils (creosote): These are the "oils heavier than water." This specific fraction is the medical or industrial creosote, valued for its preservative and antiseptic properties.

Product by wood pyrolysis temperature
	Slow pyrolysis	Fast pyrolysis	Gasification
Product	Charcoal (solid fuel)	Bio-oil (liquid fuel)	Synthesis gas
Temperature	250–450 °C	450–600 °C	700–1000+ °C
Liquid yield	Low (~30%)	High (~50–75%)	Very Low (<5%)
Solid yield	High (~35–40%)	Low (~15–20%)	Minimal (ash only)
Gas yield	Moderate (~35%)	Low (~15–20%)	High (~85%+)

== General processes and mechanisms ==
Processes in the thermal degradation of organic matter at atmospheric pressure

Pyrolysis generally consists of heating the material above its decomposition temperature, breaking chemical bonds in its molecules. The fragments usually become smaller molecules, but may combine to produce residues with larger molecular mass, even amorphous covalent solids.

In many settings, some amounts of oxygen, water, or other substances may be present, so that combustion, hydrolysis, or other chemical processes may occur besides pyrolysis proper. Sometimes those chemicals are added intentionally, as in the burning of firewood, in the traditional manufacture of charcoal, and in the steam cracking of crude oil.

Conversely, the starting material may be heated in a vacuum or in an inert atmosphere to avoid chemical side reactions (such as combustion or hydrolysis). Pyrolysis in a vacuum also lowers the boiling point of the byproducts, improving their recovery.

When organic matter is heated at increasing temperatures in open containers, the following processes generally occur, in successive or overlapping stages:

- Below about 100 °C, volatiles, including some water, evaporate. Heat-sensitive substances, such as vitamin C and proteins, may partially change or decompose already at this stage.
- At about 100 °C or slightly higher, any remaining water that is merely absorbed in the material is driven off. This process consumes a lot of energy, so the temperature may stop rising until all water has evaporated. Water trapped in crystal structure of hydrates may come off at somewhat higher temperatures.
- Some solid substances, like fats, waxes, and sugars, may melt and separate.
- Between 100 and 500 °C, many common organic molecules break down. Most sugars start decomposing at 160–180 °C. Cellulose, a major component of wood, paper, and cotton fabrics, decomposes at about 350 °C. Lignin, another major wood component, starts decomposing at about 350 °C, but continues releasing volatile products up to 500 °C. The decomposition products usually include water, carbon monoxide CO and/or carbon dioxide CO_{2}, as well as a large number of organic compounds. Gases and volatile products leave the sample, and some of them may condense again as smoke. Generally, this process also absorbs energy. Some volatiles may ignite and burn, creating a visible flame. The non-volatile residues typically become richer in carbon and form large disordered molecules, with colors ranging between brown and black. At this point the matter is said to have been "charred" or "carbonized".
- At 200–300 °C, if oxygen has not been excluded, the carbonaceous residue may start to burn, in a highly exothermic reaction, often with no or little visible flame. Once carbon combustion starts, the temperature rises spontaneously, turning the residue into a glowing ember and releasing carbon dioxide and/or monoxide. At this stage, some of the nitrogen still remaining in the residue may be oxidized into nitrogen oxides like NO_{2} and N_{2}O_{3}. Sulfur and other elements like chlorine and arsenic may be oxidized and volatilized at this stage.
- Once combustion of the carbonaceous residue is complete, a powdery or solid mineral residue (ash) is often left behind, consisting of inorganic oxidized materials of high melting point. Some of the ash may have left during combustion, entrained by the gases as fly ash or particulate emissions. Metals present in the original matter usually remain in the ash as oxides or carbonates, such as potash. Phosphorus, from materials such as bone, phospholipids, and nucleic acids, usually remains as phosphates.

== Safety challenges ==
Because pyrolysis takes place at high temperatures which exceed the autoignition temperature of the produced gases, an explosion risk exists if oxygen is present. Careful temperature control is needed for pyrolysis systems, which can be accomplished with pyrolysis controller. Pyrolysis also produces various toxic gases, such as carbon monoxide. The greatest risk of fire, explosion, and release of toxic gases comes when the system is starting up and shutting down, operating intermittently, or during operational upsets.

Inert gas purging is essential to manage inherent explosion risks. The procedure is not trivial and failure to keep oxygen out has led to accidents.

== Occurrence and uses ==
=== Clandestine chemistry ===
Conversion of CBD to THC can be brought about by pyrolysis.

=== Cooking ===
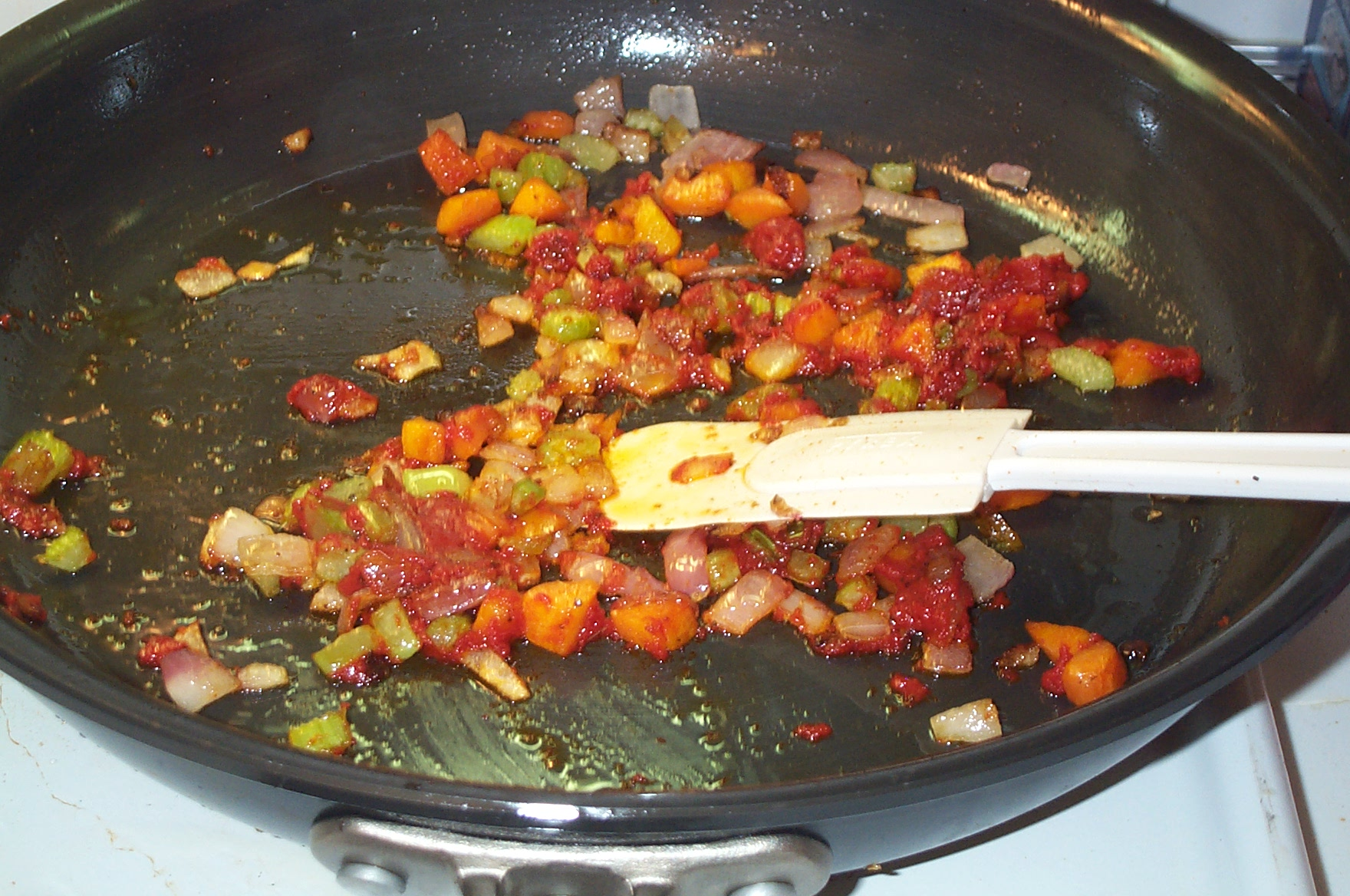
Caramelized onions are slightly pyrolyzed.

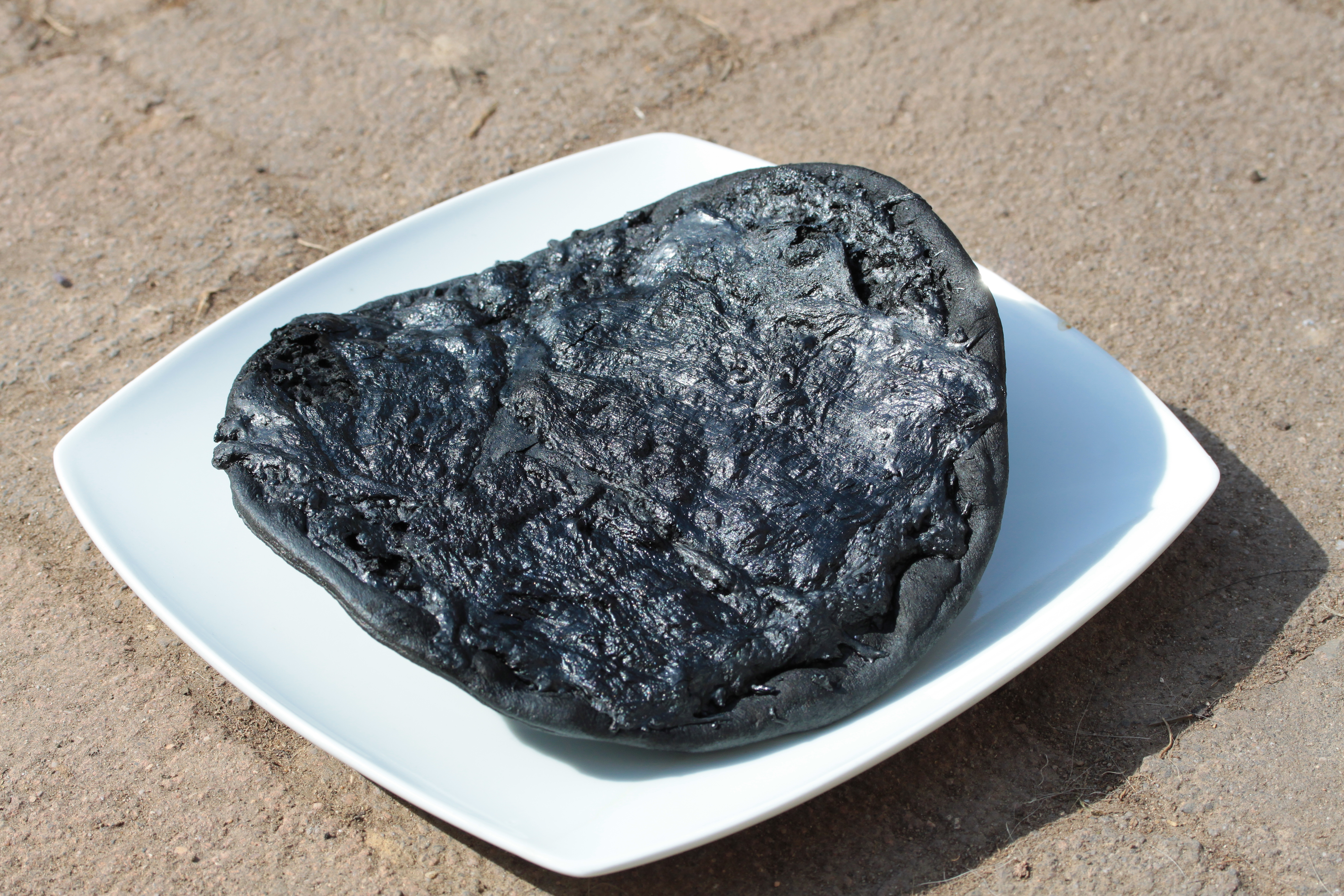
This pizza is pyrolyzed, almost completely carbonized.

Pyrolysis has many applications in food preparation. Caramelization is the pyrolysis of sugars in food (often after the sugars have been produced by the breakdown of polysaccharides). The food goes brown and changes flavor. The distinctive flavors are used in many dishes; for instance, caramelized onion is used in French onion soup. The temperatures needed for caramelization lie above the boiling point of water. Frying oil can easily rise above the boiling point. Putting a lid on the frying pan keeps the water in, re-condensing some and keeping the temperature too cool to brown.

Pyrolysis of food can also be undesirable, as in the charring of burnt food (at temperatures too low for the oxidative combustion of carbon to produce flames and burn the food to ash).

=== Coke, carbon, charcoals, and chars ===
Charcoal briquettes, often made from compressed sawdust or similar, in use

Carbon and carbon-rich materials have desirable properties but are nonvolatile, even at high temperatures. Consequently, pyrolysis is used to produce many kinds of carbon; these can be used for fuel, as reagents in steelmaking (coke), and as structural materials.

Charcoal is a less smoky fuel than pyrolyzed wood. Some cities ban, or used to ban, wood fires; when residents only use charcoal (and similarly treated rock coal, called coke) air pollution is significantly reduced. In cities where people do not generally cook or heat with fires, this is not needed. In the mid-20th century, "smokeless" legislation in Europe required cleaner-burning techniques, such as coke fuel and smoke-burning incinerators as an effective measure to reduce air pollution.

A blacksmith's forge, with a blower forcing air through a bed of fuel to raise the temperature of the fire. On the periphery, coal is pyrolyzed, absorbing heat; the coke at the center is almost pure carbon, and releases a lot of heat when the carbon oxidizes.

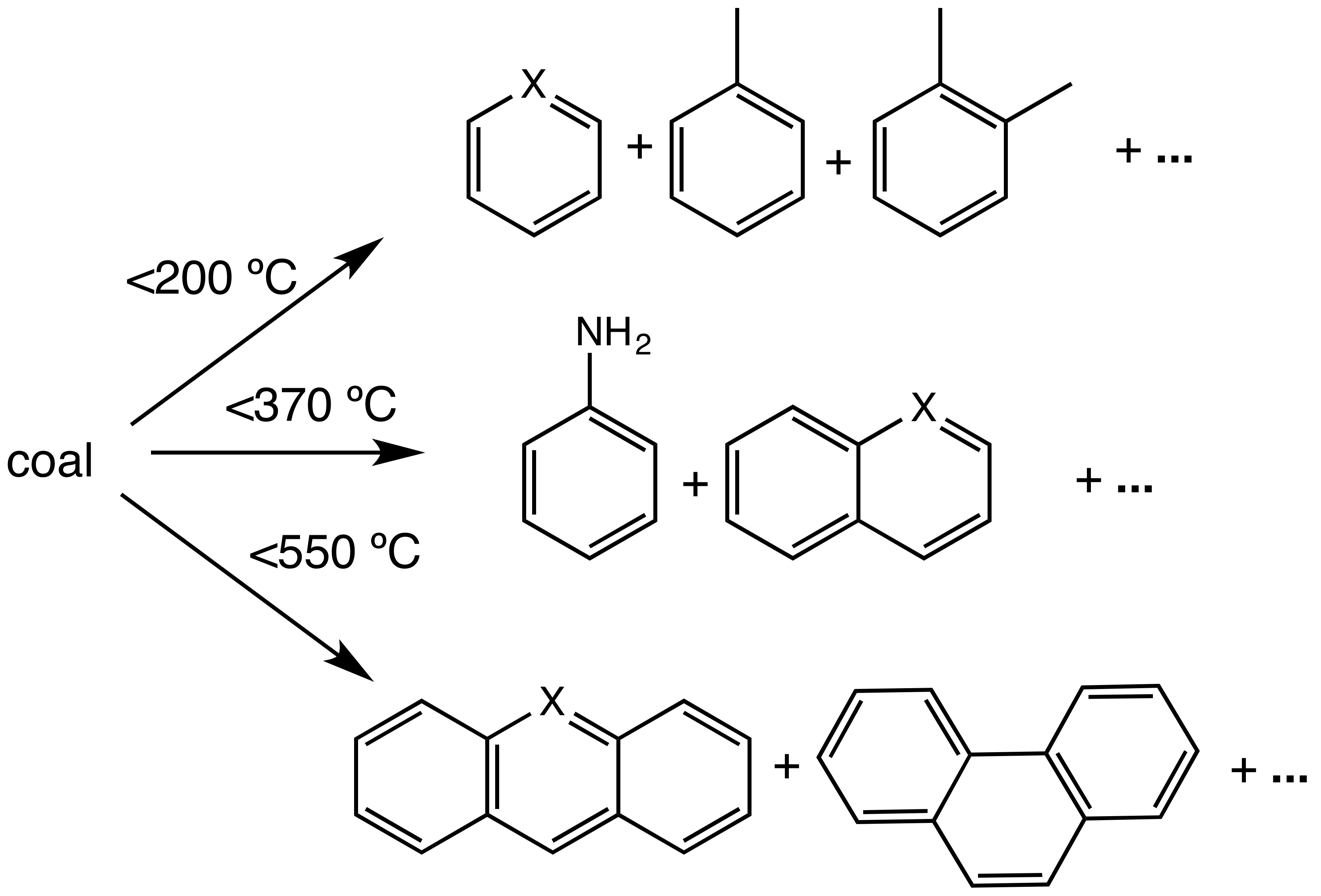
Typical organic products obtained by pyrolysis of coal (X = CH, N)

The coke-making or "coking" process consists of heating the material in "coking ovens" to very high temperatures (up to 900 °C or 1,700 °F) so that the molecules are broken down into lighter volatile substances, which leave the vessel, and a porous but hard residue that is mostly carbon and inorganic ash. The amount of volatiles varies with the source material, but is typically 25–30% of it by weight. High temperature pyrolysis is used on an industrial scale to convert coal into coke. This is useful in metallurgy, where the higher temperatures are necessary for many processes, such as steelmaking. Volatile by-products of this process are also often useful, including benzene and pyridine. Coke can also be produced from the solid residue left from petroleum refining.

The original vascular structure of the wood and the pores created by escaping gases combine to produce a light and porous material. By starting with a dense wood-like material, such as nutshells or peach stones, one obtains a form of charcoal with particularly fine pores (and hence a much larger pore surface area), called activated carbon, which is used as an adsorbent for a wide range of chemical substances.

Biochar is the residue of incomplete organic pyrolysis, e.g., from cooking fires. It is a key component of the terra preta soils associated with ancient indigenous communities of the Amazon basin. Terra preta is much sought by local farmers for its superior fertility and capacity to promote and retain an enhanced suite of beneficial microbiota, compared to the typical red soil of the region. Efforts are underway to recreate these soils through biochar, the solid residue of pyrolysis of various materials, mostly organic waste.

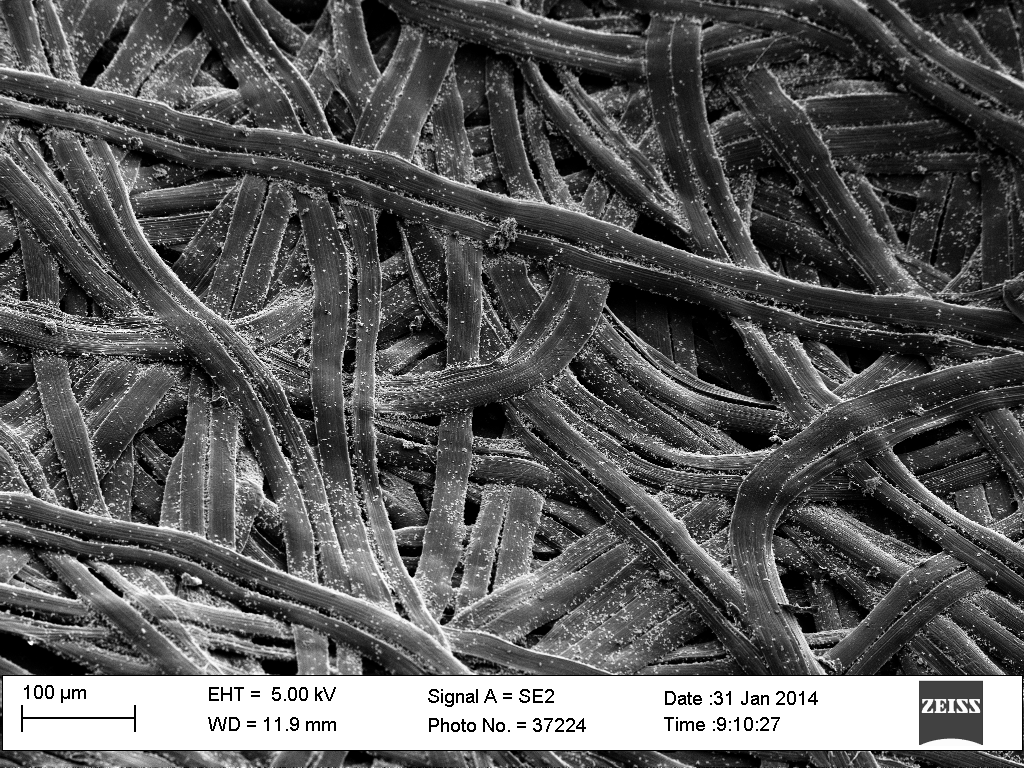
Carbon fibers produced by pyrolyzing a silk cocoon. Electron micrograph, scale bar at bottom left shows 100 μm.

Carbon fibers are filaments of carbon that can be used to make very strong yarns and textiles. Carbon fiber items are often produced by spinning and weaving the desired item from fibers of a suitable polymer, and then pyrolyzing the material at a high temperature (from 1,500–3,000 °C or 2,730–5,430 °F). The first carbon fibers were made from rayon, but polyacrylonitrile has become the most common starting material. For their first workable electric lamps, Joseph Wilson Swan and Thomas Edison used carbon filaments made by pyrolysis of cotton yarns and bamboo splinters, respectively.

Pyrolysis is the reaction used to coat a preformed substrate with a layer of pyrolytic carbon. This is typically done in a fluidized bed reactor heated to 1,000–2,000 °C or 1,830–3,630 °F. Pyrolytic carbon coatings are used in many applications, including artificial heart valves.

=== Liquid and gaseous biofuels ===
Pyrolysis is the basis of several methods for producing fuel from biomass, i.e. lignocellulosic biomass. Crops studied as biomass feedstock for pyrolysis include native North American prairie grasses such as switchgrass and bred versions of other grasses such as Miscantheus giganteus. Other sources of organic matter as feedstock for pyrolysis include greenwaste, sawdust, waste wood, leaves, vegetables, nut shells, straw, cotton trash, rice hulls, and orange peels. Animal waste including poultry litter, dairy manure, and potentially other manures are also under evaluation. Some industrial byproducts are also suitable feedstock including paper sludge, distillers grain, and sewage sludge.

In the biomass components, the pyrolysis of hemicellulose happens between 210 and 310 °C. The pyrolysis of cellulose starts from 300 to 315 °C and ends at 360–380 °C, with a peak at 342–354 °C. Lignin starts to decompose at about 200 °C and continues until 1000 °C.

Synthetic diesel fuel by pyrolysis of organic materials is not yet economically competitive. Higher efficiency is sometimes achieved by flash pyrolysis, in which finely divided feedstock is quickly heated to between 350 and 500 °C (660 and 930 °F) for less than two seconds.

Syngas is usually produced by pyrolysis.

The low quality of oils produced through pyrolysis can be improved by physical and chemical processes, which might drive up production costs, but may make sense economically as circumstances change.

There is also the possibility of integrating with other processes such as mechanical biological treatment and anaerobic digestion. Fast pyrolysis is also investigated for biomass conversion. Fuel bio-oil can also be produced by hydrous pyrolysis.

=== Methane pyrolysis for hydrogen ===
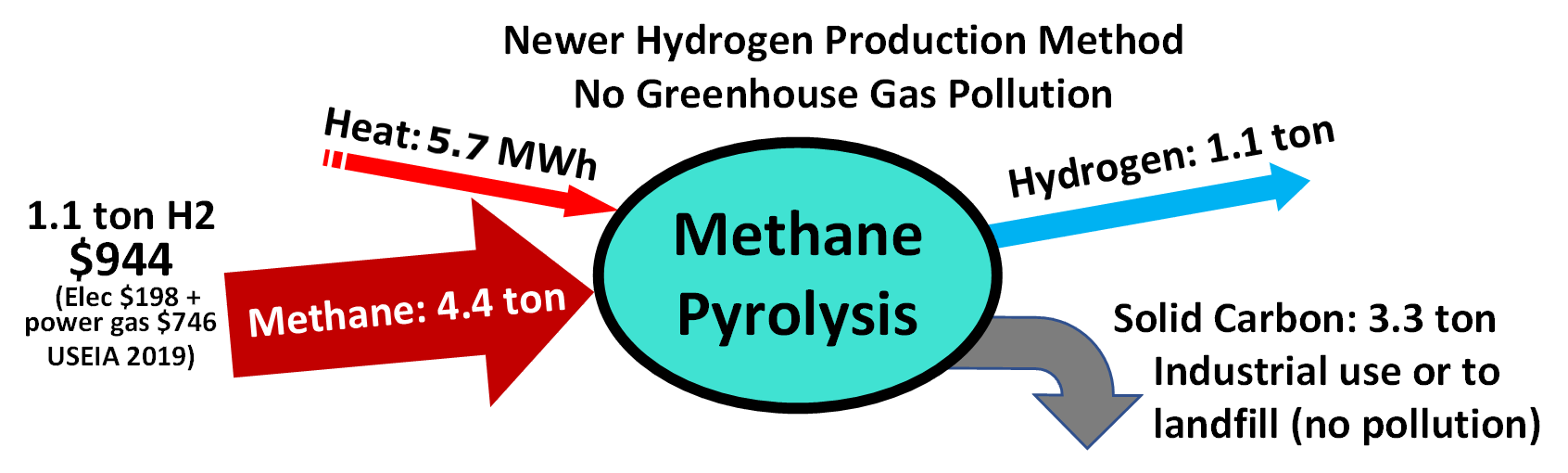
Illustrating inputs and outputs of methane pyrolysis, an efficient one-step process to produce hydrogen and no greenhouse gas

Methane pyrolysis is an industrial process for "turquoise" hydrogen production from methane by removing solid carbon from natural gas. This one-step process produces hydrogen in high volume at low cost (less than steam reforming with carbon sequestration). No greenhouse gas is released. No deep well injection of carbon dioxide is needed. Only water is released when hydrogen is used as the fuel for fuel-cell electric heavy truck transportation, gas turbine electric power generation, and hydrogen for industrial processes including producing ammonia fertilizer and cement. Methane pyrolysis is the process operating around 1065 °C for producing hydrogen from natural gas that allows removal of carbon easily (solid carbon is a byproduct of the process). The industrial quality solid carbon can then be sold or landfilled and is not released into the atmosphere, avoiding emission of greenhouse gas (GHG) or ground water pollution from a landfill.

In 2015, a company called Monolith Materials built a pilot plant in Redwood City, CA to study scaling Methane Pyrolysis using renewable power in the process. A successful pilot project then led to a larger commercial-scale demonstration plant in Hallam, Nebraska in 2016. As of 2020, this plant is operational and can produce around 14 metric tons of hydrogen per day. In 2021, the US Department of Energy backed Monolith Materials' plans for major expansion with a $1B loan guarantee. The funding will help produce a plant capable of generating 164 metric tons of hydrogen per day by 2024. Pilots with gas utilities and biogas plants are underway with companies like Modern Hydrogen. Volume production is also being evaluated in the BASF "methane pyrolysis at scale" pilot plant, the chemical engineering team at University of California - Santa Barbara and in such research laboratories as Karlsruhe Liquid-metal Laboratory (KALLA). Power for process heat consumed is only one-seventh of the power consumed in the water electrolysis method for producing hydrogen.

The Australian company Hazer Group was founded in 2010 to commercialise technology originally developed at the University of Western Australia. The company was listed on the ASX in December 2015. It is completing a commercial demonstration project to produce renewable hydrogen and graphite from wastewater and iron ore as a process catalyst use technology created by the University of Western Australia (UWA). The Commercial Demonstration Plant project is an Australian first, and expected to produce around 100 tonnes of fuel-grade hydrogen and 380 tonnes of graphite each year starting in 2023. It was scheduled to commence in 2022. "10 December 2021: Hazer Group (ASX: HZR) regret to advise that there has been a delay to the completion of the fabrication of the reactor for the Hazer Commercial Demonstration Project (CDP). This is expected to delay the planned commissioning of the Hazer CDP, with commissioning now expected to occur after our current target date of 1Q 2022." The Hazer Group has collaboration agreements with Engie for a facility in France in May 2023, A Memorandum of Understanding with Chubu Electric & Chiyoda in Japan April 2023 and an agreement with Suncor Energy and FortisBC to develop 2,500 tonnes per Annum Burrard-Hazer Hydrogen Production Plant in Canada April 2022

The American company C-Zero's technology converts natural gas into hydrogen and solid carbon. The hydrogen provides clean, low-cost energy on demand, while the carbon can be permanently sequestered. C-Zero announced in June 2022 that it closed a $34 million financing round led by SK Gas, a subsidiary of South Korea's second-largest conglomerate, the SK Group. SK Gas was joined by two other new investors, Engie New Ventures and Trafigura, one of the world's largest physical commodities trading companies, in addition to participation from existing investors including Breakthrough Energy Ventures, Eni Next, Mitsubishi Heavy Industries, and AP Ventures. Funding was for C-Zero's first pilot plant, which was expected to be online in Q1 2023. The plant may be capable of producing up to 400 kg of hydrogen per day from natural gas with no CO_{2} emissions.

One of the world's largest chemical companies, BASF, has been researching hydrogen pyrolysis for more than 10 years.

=== Ethylene ===
Pyrolysis is used to produce ethylene, the chemical compound produced on the largest scale industrially (>110 million tons/year in 2005). In this process, hydrocarbons from petroleum are heated to around 600 °C (1,112 °F) in the presence of steam; this is called steam cracking. The resulting ethylene is used to make antifreeze (ethylene glycol), PVC (via vinyl chloride), and many other polymers, such as polyethylene and polystyrene.

=== Semiconductors ===
Illustration of the metalorganic vapour phase epitaxy process, which entails pyrolysis of volatiles

The process of metalorganic vapour-phase epitaxy (MOCVD) entails pyrolysis of volatile organometallic compounds to give semiconductors, hard coatings, and other applicable materials. The reactions entail thermal degradation of precursors, with deposition of the inorganic component and release of the hydrocarbons as gaseous waste. Since it is an atom-by-atom deposition, these atoms organize themselves into crystals to form the bulk semiconductor. Raw polycrystalline silicon is produced by the chemical vapor deposition of silane gases:

SiH_{4} → Si + 2 H_{2}

Gallium arsenide, another semiconductor, forms upon co-pyrolysis of trimethylgallium and arsine.

=== Waste management ===
Pyrolysis can also be used to treat municipal solid waste and plastic waste. The main advantage is the reduction in volume of the waste. In principle, pyrolysis will regenerate the monomers (precursors) to the polymers that are treated, but in practice the process is neither a clean nor an economically competitive source of monomers.

In tire waste management, tire pyrolysis is a well-developed technology. Other products from car tire pyrolysis include steel wires, carbon black and bitumen. The area faces legislative, economic, and marketing obstacles. Oil derived from tire rubber pyrolysis has a high sulfur content, which gives it high potential as a pollutant; consequently it should be desulfurized.

Alkaline pyrolysis of sewage sludge at low temperature of 500 °C can enhance H_{2} production with in-situ carbon capture. The use of NaOH (sodium hydroxide) has the potential to produce H_{2}-rich gas that can be used for fuels cells directly.

In early November 2021, the U.S. State of Georgia announced a joint effort with Igneo Technologies to build an $85 million large electronics recycling plant in the Port of Savannah. The project will focus on lower-value, plastics-heavy devices in the waste stream using multiple shredders and furnaces using pyrolysis technology.

Waste from pyrolysis itself can also be used for useful products. For example, contaminant-rich retentate from liquid-fed pyrolysis of postconsumer multilayer packaging waste can be used as novel building composite materials, which have higher compression strengths (10–12 MPa) than construction bricks and brickworks (7 MPa), as well as 57% lower density, 0.77 g/cm^{3}.

==== One-stepwise pyrolysis and two-stepwise pyrolysis for tobacco waste ====
Pyrolysis has also been used in trying to mitigate tobacco waste. One method was done where tobacco waste was separated into two categories, TLW (Tobacco Leaf Waste) and TSW (Tobacco Stick Waste). TLW was determined to be any waste from cigarettes and TSW was determined to be any waste from electronic cigarettes. Both TLW and TSW were dried at 80 °C for 24 hours and stored in a desiccator. Samples were grounded so that the contents were uniform. Tobacco Waste (TW) also contains inorganic (metal) contents, which was determined using an inductively coupled plasma-optical spectrometer. Thermo-gravimetric analysis was used to thermally degrade four samples (TLW, TSW, glycerol, and guar gum) and monitored under specific dynamic temperature conditions. About one gram of both TLW and TSW were used in the pyrolysis tests. During these analysis tests, CO_{2} and N_{2} were used as atmospheres inside of a tubular reactor that was built using quartz tubing. For both CO_{2} and N_{2} atmospheres the flow rate was 100 mL min^{−1}. External heating was created via a tubular furnace. The pyrogenic products were classified into three phases. The first phase was biochar, a solid residue produced by the reactor at 650 °C. The second phase liquid hydrocarbons were collected by a cold solvent trap and sorted by using chromatography. The third and final phase was analyzed using an online micro GC unit and those pyrolysates were gases.

Two different types of experiments were conducted: one-stepwise pyrolysis and two-stepwise pyrolysis. One-stepwise pyrolysis consisted of a constant heating rate (10 °C min^{−1}) from 30 to 720 °C. In the second step of the two-stepwise pyrolysis test the pyrolysates from the one-stepwise pyrolysis were pyrolyzed in the second heating zone which was controlled isothermally at 650 °C. The two-stepwise pyrolysis was used to focus primarily on how well CO_{2} affects carbon redistribution when adding heat through the second heating zone.

First noted was the thermolytic behaviors of TLW and TSW in both the CO_{2} and N_{2} environments. For both TLW and TSW the thermolytic behaviors were identical at less than or equal to 660 °C in the CO_{2} and N_{2} environments. The differences between the environments start to occur when temperatures increase above 660 °C and the residual mass percentages significantly decrease in the CO_{2} environment compared to that in the N_{2} environment. This observation is likely due to the Boudouard reaction, where we see spontaneous gasification happening when temperatures exceed 710 °C. Although these observations were seen at temperatures lower than 710 °C it is most likely due to the catalytic capabilities of inorganics in TLW. It was further investigated by doing ICP-OES measurements and found that a fifth of the residual mass percentage was Ca species. CaCO_{3} is used in cigarette papers and filter material, leading to the explanation that degradation of CaCO_{3} causes pure CO_{2} reacting with CaO in a dynamic equilibrium state. This being the reason for seeing mass decay between 660 °C and 710 °C. Differences in differential thermogram (DTG) peaks for TLW were compared to TSW. TLW had four distinctive peaks at 87, 195, 265, and 306 °C whereas TSW had two major drop offs at 200 and 306 °C with one spike in between. The four peaks indicated that TLW contains more diverse types of additives than TSW. The residual mass percentage between TLW and TSW was further compared, where the residual mass in TSW was less than that of TLW for both CO_{2} and N_{2} environments concluding that TSW has higher quantities of additives than TLW.

Production of hydrogen, methane, and tars when creating biochar

The one-stepwise pyrolysis experiment showed different results for the CO_{2} and N_{2} environments. During this process the evolution of 5 different notable gases were observed. Hydrogen, Methane, Ethane, Carbon Dioxide, and Ethylene all are produced when the thermolytic rate of TLW began to be retarded at greater than or equal to 500 °C. Thermolytic rate begins at the same temperatures for both the CO_{2} and N_{2} environment but there is higher concentration of the production of Hydrogen, Ethane, Ethylene, and Methane in the N_{2} environment than that in the CO_{2} environment. The concentration of CO in the CO_{2} environment is significantly greater as temperatures increase past 600 °C and this is due to CO_{2} being liberated from CaCO_{3} in TLW. This significant increase in CO concentration is why there is lower concentrations of other gases produced in the CO_{2} environment due to a dilution effect. Since pyrolysis is the re-distribution of carbons in carbon substrates into three pyrogenic products. The CO_{2} environment is going to be more effective because the CO_{2} reduction into CO allows for the oxidation of pyrolysates to form CO. In conclusion the CO_{2} environment allows a higher yield of gases than oil and biochar. When the same process is done for TSW the trends are almost identical therefore the same explanations can be applied to the pyrolysis of TSW.

Harmful chemicals were reduced in the CO_{2} environment due to CO formation causing tar to be reduced. One-stepwise pyrolysis was not that effective on activating CO_{2} on carbon rearrangement due to the high quantities of liquid pyrolysates (tar). Two-stepwise pyrolysis for the CO_{2} environment allowed for greater concentrations of gases due to the second heating zone. The second heating zone was at a consistent temperature of 650 °C isothermally. More reactions between CO_{2} and gaseous pyrolysates with longer residence time meant that CO_{2} could further convert pyrolysates into CO. The results showed that the two-stepwise pyrolysis was an effective way to decrease tar content and increase gas concentration by about 10 wt.% for both TLW (64.20 wt.%) and TSW (73.71%).

=== Thermal cleaning ===
Pyrolysis is also used for thermal cleaning, an industrial application to remove organic substances such as polymers, plastics and coatings from parts, products or production components like extruder screws, spinnerets and static mixers. During the thermal cleaning process, at temperatures from 310 to 540 °C (600 to 1,000 °F), organic material is converted by pyrolysis and oxidation into volatile organic compounds, hydrocarbons and carbonized gas. Inorganic elements remain.

Several types of thermal cleaning systems use pyrolysis:

- Molten salt baths belong to the oldest thermal cleaning systems; cleaning with a molten salt bath is very fast but implies the risk of dangerous splatters, or other potential hazards connected with the use of salt baths, like explosions or highly toxic hydrogen cyanide gas.
- Fluidized bed systems use sand or aluminium oxide as heating medium; these systems also clean very fast but the medium does not melt or boil, nor emit any vapors or odors; the cleaning process takes one to two hours.
- Vacuum ovens use pyrolysis in a vacuum avoiding uncontrolled combustion inside the cleaning chamber; the cleaning process takes 8 to 30 hours.
- Burn-off ovens, also known as heat-cleaning ovens, are gas-fired and used in the painting, coatings, electric motors and plastics industries for removing organics from heavy and large metal parts.

=== Fine chemical synthesis ===
Pyrolysis is used in the production of chemical compounds, mainly, but not only, in the research laboratory.

The area of boron-hydride clusters started with the study of the pyrolysis of diborane (B_{2}H_{6}) at ca. 200 °C. Products include the clusters pentaborane and decaborane. These pyrolyses involve not only cracking (to give H_{2}), but also recondensation.

The synthesis of nanoparticles, zirconia and oxides utilizing an ultrasonic nozzle in a process called ultrasonic spray pyrolysis (USP).

=== Other uses and occurrences ===
- Pyrolysis is used to turn organic materials into carbon for the purpose of carbon-14 dating.
- Pyrolysis liquids from slow pyrolysis of bark and hemp have been tested for their antifungal activity against wood decaying fungi, showing potential to substitute the current wood preservatives while further tests are still required. However, their ecotoxicity is very variable and while some are less toxic than current wood preservatives, other pyrolysis liquids have shown high ecotoxicity, what may cause detrimental effects in the environment.
- Pyrolysis of tobacco, paper, and additives, in cigarettes and other products, generates many volatile products (including nicotine, carbon monoxide, and tar) that are responsible for the aroma and negative health effects of smoking. Similar considerations apply to the smoking of marijuana and the burning of incense products and mosquito coils.
- Pyrolysis occurs during the incineration of trash, potentially generating volatiles that are toxic or contribute to air pollution if not completely burned.
- Laboratory or industrial equipment sometimes gets fouled by carbonaceous residues that result from coking, the pyrolysis of organic products that come into contact with hot surfaces.

== PAHs generation ==
Polycyclic aromatic hydrocarbons (PAHs) can be generated from the pyrolysis of different solid waste fractions, such as hemicellulose, cellulose, lignin, pectin, starch, polyethylene (PE), polystyrene (PS), polyvinyl chloride (PVC), and polyethylene terephthalate (PET). PS, PVC, and lignin generate significant amount of PAHs. Naphthalene is the most abundant PAH among all the polycyclic aromatic hydrocarbons.

When the temperature is increased from 500 to 900 °C, most PAHs increase. With increasing temperature, the percentage of light PAHs decreases and the percentage of heavy PAHs increases.

== Study tools ==
=== Thermogravimetric analysis ===
Thermogravimetric analysis (TGA) is one of the most common techniques to investigate pyrolysis with no limitations of heat and mass transfer. The results can be used to determine mass loss kinetics. Activation energies can be calculated using the Kissinger method or peak analysis-least square method (PA-LSM).

TGA can couple with Fourier-transform infrared spectroscopy (FTIR) and mass spectrometry. As the temperature increases, the volatiles generated from pyrolysis can be measured.

=== Macro-TGA ===
In TGA, the sample is loaded first before the increase of temperature, and the heating rate is low (less than 100 °C min^{−1}). Macro-TGA can use gram-scale samples to investigate the effects of pyrolysis with mass and heat transfer.

=== Pyrolysis–gas chromatography–mass spectrometry ===
Pyrolysis mass spectrometry (Py-GC-MS) is an important laboratory procedure to determine the structure of compounds.

=== Pyrolysis–mass spectrometry ===
Pyrolysis mass spectrometry (Py-MS) is a new technique that combines pyrolysis with DART-MS or Ambient Corona Discharge Ionization-mass spectrometry for Thermal Desorption and Pyrolysis to determine the structure of small molecules and polymers.

=== Machine learning ===
In recent years, machine learning has attracted significant research interest in predicting yields, optimizing parameters, and monitoring pyrolytic processes.

== See also ==
- Dextrin
- Gasification
- Hydrogen
- Hydrogen production
- Karrick process
- Pyrolytic coating
- Thermal decomposition
- Torrefaction
- Wood gas
