= CashLady =

UK-based financial services company

- Trade name: CashLady
- Company type: Private company
- Industry: Financial services and Technology
- Founded: 2008; 18 years ago
- Founders: Avner Brodsky and Michal Brodsky
- Headquarters: Chester, United Kingdom
- Area served: United Kingdom
- Key people: Timothy Moss (Director)
- Products: Payday loans
- Parent: Digitonomy Limited
- Website: www.cashlady.com

CashLady is UK-based financial services company and a short-term loan broker. The company works with various payday loan providers, matching applicants with lenders. CashLady acts as an intermediary in this capacity.

== History ==
Founded in 2008, by Money Gap Limited in London under the brand name CashLady.

CashLady was acquired by Digitonomy Limited around 2020 and continued to operate under the new owner as CashLady. The original founding company, Money Gap Limited went into insolvency on the 8 September 2020 and was dissolved on 9 March 2022.

== Regulatory action ==
In 2013 Cash Lady was heavily criticised over an advertising campaign featuring Kerry Katona. Following complaints to the Advertising Standards Authority (United Kingdom), CashLady advertisements were re-edited to remove the phrase 'Fast Cash for Fast Lives'. The ASA believed that this phrase implied that a payday loan would ‘help fund a high-flying celebrity lifestyle’. In July 2013, (one month later) Kerry Katona declared bankruptcy for the second time and was subsequently dropped by Cash Lady after the ASA ruled that Cash Lady could no longer use Katona in adverts due to heavy associations with personal debt.

In 2014 Money Gap Group Limited was one of the companies helping the Competition and Markets Authority in the payday lending market investigation.
