= Catagenesis (geology) =

Cracking process in petroleum geology

Catagenesis (Note: Sometimes spelled as katagenesis) is a term used in petroleum geology to describe the cracking process which results in the conversion of organic kerogens into hydrocarbons.

== Theoretical reaction ==
Catagenesis is the second stage of maturation of organic carbon on the path to becoming graphitic. This geologic process accounts for very significant changes in the biogenic materials that make up the carbonaceous sediment. During catagenesis, the temperature increases, the pressure increases, and both organic and inorganic constituents “adjust” their phase or form to compensate. The process of “lithification” begins during this stage. Generally speaking, a rise in temperature results in the volatization of unstable species or elements that are weakly attached to carbon atoms. Increased temperature and pressure also result in the cessation of biogenic processes. One way to express these changes is to look at the ratio of oxygen to carbon, or hydrogen to carbon as the sediment matures. In almost all cases, as biogenic material matures in a geologic environment, the volatile elements such as oxygen and hydrogen are significantly reduced, resulting in a reduction in the O/C and H/C ratios. A typical O/C ratio value for a fully matured, catagenesis stage carbon might be less than 0.1. This means that for every 100 carbon atoms there are less than 10 oxygen atoms. Similar reductions in the level of hydrogen are also apparent.

This chemical reaction is believed to be a time, temperature and pressure dependent process which creates liquid and/or gaseous hydrocarbon Hc from primary kerogen X and can be summarised using the formula:

$$X_0 \rightarrow Hc + X(t)$$

where X_{0} is the initial kerogen concentration and X(t) is the kerogen concentration at time t.

It is generally held that the dependence on pressure is negligible, such that the process of catagenesis can be given as a first-order differential equation:

$$\frac{dX}{dt} = - \kappa X$$

where X is the reactant (kerogen) and κ is the reaction rate constant which introduces the temperature-dependence via the Arrhenius equation.

== Important parameters ==
Several generally unrecognized but important controlling parameters of metamorphism have been suggested.

- The absence or presence of water in the system, because hydrocarbon-thermal destruction is significantly suppressed in the presence of water.
- Increasing fluid pressure strongly suppresses all organic-matter metamorphism.
- Product escape from reaction sites, as lack of product escape retards metamorphism.
- Increasing temperature as the principal driver of reactions.

== Future work ==
A great deal of future research is required to isolate the parameters which are most significant for inducing the catagenetic process. Future work in the field will involve the following:

- Establishing the precise relationship between burial time and hydrocarbon cracking.
- Determining how hydrogen from water is ultimately incorporated in kerogen.
- Establishing the effect of regional shearing.
- Determining how static fluid pressure affects hydrocarbon generation. Some experiments have demonstrated that static fluid pressure may explain the presence of hydrocarbon concentrations at depths where their composition would not otherwise be expected.
- Many measurements of hydrocarbon content in sample rocks have been done at atmospheric pressure. This ignores the loss of large amounts of hydrocarbons during depressurization. Rock samples at atmospheric pressure have been measured at 0.11–2.13 percent of samples at formation pressure. Observations at well sites include fizzing of rock chips and oil films covering drilling mud pits.
- Types of organic matter can not be ignored. Different types of organic matter have different chemical bonds, bond strength patterns, and thus different activation energies.
- C_{15}+ hydrocarbons are stable at much higher temperatures than predicted by first-order reaction kinetics.

For example, while it was once assumed that catagenetic processes were first-order reactions, some research has shown that this may not be the case.

== See also ==
- Diagenesis
- Fossil fuels
- Metamorphic reaction
