= Thermal decomposition =

Chemical decomposition caused by heat

Processes in the thermal degradation of organic matter at atmospheric pressure.

Thermal decomposition, or thermolysis, is a chemical decomposition of a substance caused by heat. The decomposition temperature of a substance is the temperature at which the substance chemically decomposes. The reaction is usually endothermic as heat is required to break chemical bonds in the compound undergoing decomposition. If decomposition is sufficiently exothermic, a positive feedback loop is created producing thermal runaway and possibly an explosion or other chemical reaction.

== Decomposition temperature definition ==
The thermal decomposition temperature is the specific temperature at which a material begins to undergo chemical breakdown into simpler substances when subjected to heat, usually identified experimentally by the initial significant mass loss in a thermogravimetric (TGA) curve. This marks the onset of observable chemical decomposition, where chemical bonds cleave solely due to thermal energy.

Since chemical reactions are essentially always occurring, because molecules assume a probability distribution of energies, there is no distinct temperature value at which decomposition spontaneously occurs. Therefore, the onset temperature is often used experimentally; this is the temperature at which a chemical reaction occurs at a measurable rate, and is thus highly dependent on the sensitivity of the corresponding instrument. The onset temperature can be calculated using differential scanning calorimetry (DSC), which is also sensitive to the rate of heating. A higher rate of heating will often display a higher onset temperature due to further kinetic variables such as reaction order, activation energy, and autocatalytic behaviour.

A simple substance (like water) may exist in equilibrium with its thermal decomposition products, effectively halting the decomposition. The equilibrium fraction of decomposed molecules increases with the temperature. Since thermal decomposition is a kinetic process, the observed temperature of its beginning in most instances will be a function of the experimental conditions and sensitivity of the experimental setup. For a rigorous depiction of the process, the use of thermokinetic modeling is recommended.

== Examples ==
=== Common practice ===
Most people encounter thermal decomposition as a side effect of cooking. The crust forming process on bread or meat is a well intended example. An unintended form of thermal decomposition is the black layer formed at the bottom of a cooking pot when heating is continued after all the water has evaporated. In these examples the products may not be well characterized, during the thermal decomposition of wood a well characrixed product is formed: charcoal.

=== Inorganic examples ===
- Calcium carbonate (limestone or chalk) decomposes into calcium oxide and carbon dioxide when heated. The chemical reaction is as follows:

CaCO_{3} → CaO + CO_{2}

The reaction is used to make quick lime, which is an industrially important product.
Another example of thermal decomposition is 2Pb(NO_{3})_{2} → 2PbO + O_{2} + 4NO_{2}.

- Some oxides, especially of weakly electro positive metals decompose when heated to high enough temperature. A classical example is the decomposition of mercuric oxide to give oxygen and mercury metal. The reaction was used by Joseph Priestley to prepare samples of gaseous oxygen for the first time.
- When water is heated to well over 2,000 °C (2,270 K; 3,630 °F), a small percentage of it will decompose into OH, monatomic oxygen, monatomic hydrogen, O_{2}, and H_{2}.
- The compound with the highest known decomposition temperature is carbon monoxide at ≈3,870 °C (4,140 K; 7,000 °F).

=== Decomposition of nitrates, nitrites and ammonium compounds ===
- Ammonium dichromate on heating yields nitrogen, water and chromium(III) oxide.
- Ammonium nitrate on strong heating yields dinitrogen oxide ("laughing gas") and water.
- Ammonium nitrite on heating yields nitrogen gas and water.
- Barium azide on heating yields barium metal and nitrogen gas.
- Sodium azide on heating at 300 °C (573 K; 572 °F) violently decomposes to nitrogen and metallic sodium.
- Sodium nitrate on heating yields sodium nitrite and oxygen gas.
- Organic compounds such as tertiary amines undergo Hofmann elimination when heated and yield secondary amines and alkenes.

== Ease of decomposition ==
When metals are near the bottom of the reactivity series, their compounds generally decompose easily at high temperatures. This is because stronger bonds form between atoms towards the top of the reactivity series, and strong bonds are difficult to break. For example, copper is near the bottom of the reactivity series, and copper sulfate (CuSO_{4}), begins to decompose at about 200 °C (473 K; 392 °F), increasing rapidly at higher temperatures to about 560 °C (833 K; 1,040 °F). In contrast potassium is near the top of the reactivity series, and potassium sulfate (K_{2}SO_{4}) does not decompose at its melting point of about 1,069 °C (1,342 K; 1,956 °F), nor even at its boiling point.

== Practical applications ==
Many scenarios in the real world are affected by thermal degradation. One of the things affected is fingerprints. When anyone touches something, there is residue left from the fingers. If fingers are sweaty, or contain more oils, the residue contains many chemicals. De Paoli and her colleagues conducted a study testing thermal degradation on certain components found in fingerprints. For heat exposure, the amino acid and urea samples started degradation at 100 °C (373 K; 212 °F) and for lactic acid, the decomposition process started around 50 °C (323 K; 122 °F). These components are necessary for further testing, so in the forensics discipline, decomposition of fingerprints is significant.

== See also ==
- Thermal degradation of polymer
- Ellingham diagram
- Thermochemical cycle
- Thermal depolymerization
- Chemical thermodynamics
- Pyrolysis - thermal decomposition of organic material
- Gas generator
