= Second-generation biofuels =

Biofuels manufactured from non-food biomass

Second-generation biofuels, also known as advanced biofuels, are fuels that can be manufactured from various types of non-food biomass. Biomass in this context means plant materials and animal waste used especially as a source of fuel.

First-generation biofuels are made from sugar-starch feedstocks (e.g., sugarcane and corn) and edible oil feedstocks (e.g., rapeseed and soybean oil), which are generally converted into bioethanol and biodiesel, respectively.

Second-generation biofuels are made from different feedstocks and therefore may require different technology to extract useful energy from them. Second generation feedstocks include lignocellulosic biomass or woody crops, agricultural residues or waste, as well as dedicated non-food energy crops grown on marginal land unsuitable for food production.

The term second-generation biofuels is used loosely to describe both the 'advanced' technology used to process feedstocks into biofuel, but also the use of non-food crops, biomass and wastes as feedstocks in 'standard' biofuels processing technologies if suitable. This causes some considerable confusion. Therefore it is important to distinguish between second-generation feedstocks and second-generation biofuel processing technologies.

The development of second-generation biofuels has seen a stimulus since the food vs. fuel dilemma regarding the risk of diverting farmland or crops for biofuels production to the detriment of food supply. The biofuel and food price debate involves wide-ranging views, and is a long-standing, controversial one in the literature.

== Introduction ==
Second-generation biofuel technologies have been developed to enable the use of non-food biofuel feedstocks because of concerns to food security caused by the use of food crops for the production of first-generation biofuels. The diversion of edible food biomass to the production of biofuels could theoretically result in competition with food and land uses for food crops.

First-generation bioethanol is produced by fermenting plant-derived sugars to ethanol, using a similar process to that used in beer and wine-making (see Ethanol fermentation). This requires the use of food and fodder crops, such as sugar cane, corn, wheat, and sugar beet. The concern is that if these food crops are used for biofuel production that food prices could rise and shortages might be experienced in some countries. Corn, wheat, and sugar beet can also require high agricultural inputs in the form of fertilizers, which limit the greenhouse gas reductions that can be achieved. Biodiesel produced by transesterification from rapeseed oil, palm oil, or other plant oils is also considered a first-generation biofuel.

The goal of second-generation biofuel processes is to extend the amount of biofuel that can be produced sustainably by using biomass consisting of the residual non-food parts of current crops, such as stems, leaves and husks that are left behind once the food crop has been extracted, as well as other crops that are not used for food purposes (non-food crops), such as switchgrass, grass, jatropha, whole crop maize, miscanthus and cereals that bear little grain, and also industry waste such as woodchips, skins and pulp from fruit pressing, etc. However, its production can serve as an obstacle because it's viewed as not cost-effective as well as modern technology being insufficient for its continual creation.

The problem that second-generation biofuel processes are addressing is to extract useful feedstocks from this woody or fibrous biomass, which is predominantly composed of plant cell walls. In all vascular plants the useful sugars of the cell wall are bound within the complex carbohydrates (polymers of sugar molecules) hemicellulose and cellulose, but made inaccessible for direct use by the phenolic polymer lignin. Lignocellulosic ethanol is made by extracting sugar molecules from the carbohydrates using enzymes, steam heating, or other pre-treatments. These sugars can then be fermented to produce ethanol in the same way as first-generation bioethanol production. The by-product of this process is lignin. Lignin can be burned as a carbon neutral fuel to produce heat and power for the processing plant and possibly for surrounding homes and businesses. Thermochemical processes (liquefaction) in hydrothermal media can produce liquid oily products from a wide range of feedstock that has a potential to replace or augment fuels. However, these liquid products fall short of diesel or biodiesel standards. Upgrading liquefaction products through one or many physical or chemical processes may improve properties for use as fuel.

== Second-generation technology ==
The following subsections describe the main second-generation routes currently under development.

=== Thermochemical routes ===
Carbon-based materials can be heated at high temperatures in the absence (pyrolysis) or presence of oxygen, air and/or steam (gasification).

These thermochemical processes yield a mixture of gases including hydrogen, carbon monoxide, carbon dioxide, methane and other hydrocarbons, and water. Pyrolysis also produces a solid char. The gas can be fermented or chemically synthesised into a range of fuels, including ethanol, synthetic diesel, synthetic gasoline or jet fuel.

There are also lower temperature processes in the region of 150–374 °C, that produce sugars by decomposing the biomass in water with or without additives.

==== Gasification ====
Gasification technologies are well established for conventional feedstocks such as coal and crude oil. Second-generation gasification technologies include gasification of forest and agricultural residues, waste wood, energy crops and black liquor. Output is normally syngas for further synthesis to e.g. Fischer–Tropsch products including diesel fuel, biomethanol, BioDME (dimethyl ether), gasoline via catalytic conversion of dimethyl ether, or biomethane (synthetic natural gas). Syngas can also be used in heat production and for generation of mechanical and electrical power via gas motors or gas turbines.

==== Pyrolysis ====
Pyrolysis is a well established technique for decomposition of organic material at elevated temperatures in the absence of oxygen. In second-generation biofuels applications forest and agricultural residues, wood waste and energy crops can be used as feedstock to produce e.g. bio-oil for fuel oil applications. Bio-oil typically requires significant additional treatment to render it suitable as a refinery feedstock to replace crude oil.

==== Torrefaction ====
Torrefaction is a form of pyrolysis at temperatures typically ranging between 200–320 °C. Feedstocks and output are the same as for pyrolysis.

==== Hydrothermal liquefaction ====
Hydrothermal liquefaction is a process similar to pyrolysis that can process wet materials. The process is typically at moderate temperatures up to 400 °C and higher than atmospheric pressures. The capability to handle a wide range of materials make hydrothermal liquefaction viable for producing fuel and chemical production feedstock.

=== Biochemical routes ===
Chemical and biological processes that are currently used in other applications are being adapted for second-generation biofuels. Biochemical processes typically employ pre-treatment to accelerate the hydrolysis process, which separates out the lignin, hemicellulose and cellulose. Once these ingredients are separated, the cellulose fractions can be fermented into alcohols.

Feedstocks are energy crops, agricultural and forest residues, food industry and municipal biowaste and other biomass containing sugars. Products include alcohols (such as ethanol and butanol) and other hydrocarbons for transportation use.

== Types of biofuel ==
The following second-generation biofuels are under development, although most or all of these biofuels are synthesized from intermediary products such as syngas using methods that are identical in processes involving conventional feedstocks, first-generation and second-generation biofuels. The distinguishing feature is the technology involved in producing the intermediary product, rather than the ultimate off-take.

A process producing liquid fuels from gas (normally syngas) is called a gas-to-liquid (GtL) process. When biomass is the source of the gas production the process is also referred to as biomass-to-liquids (BTL).

=== From syngas using catalysis ===
- Biomethanol can be used in methanol motors or blended with petrol up to 10–20% without any infrastructure changes.
- BioDME can be produced from Biomethanol using catalytic dehydration or it can be produced directly from syngas using direct DME synthesis. DME can be used in the compression ignition engine.
- Bio-derived gasoline can be produced from DME via high-pressure catalytic condensation reaction. Bio-derived gasoline is chemically indistinguishable from petroleum-derived gasoline and thus can be blended into the gasoline pool.
- Biohydrogen can be used in fuel cells to produce electricity.
- Mixed Alcohols (i.e., mixture of mostly ethanol, propanol, and butanol, with some pentanol, hexanol, heptanol, and octanol). Mixed alcohols are produced from syngas with several classes of catalysts. Some have employed catalysts similar to those used for methanol. Molybdenum sulfide catalysts were discovered at Dow Chemical and have received considerable attention. Addition of cobalt sulfide to the catalyst formulation was shown to enhance performance. Molybdenum sulfide catalysts have been well studied but have yet to find widespread use. These catalysts have been a focus of efforts at the U.S. Department of Energy's Biomass Program in the Thermochemical Platform. Noble metal catalysts have also been shown to produce mixed alcohols. Most R&D in this area is concentrated in producing mostly ethanol. However, some fuels are marketed as mixed alcohols (see Ecalene and E4 Envirolene) Mixed alcohols are superior to pure methanol or ethanol, in that the higher alcohols have higher energy content. Also, when blending, the higher alcohols increase compatibility of gasoline and ethanol, which increases water tolerance and decreases evaporative emissions. In addition, higher alcohols have also lower heat of vaporization than ethanol, which is important for cold starts. (For another method for producing mixed alcohols from biomass see bioconversion of biomass to mixed alcohol fuels)
- Biomethane (or Bio-SNG) via the Sabatier reaction

=== From syngas using Fischer–Tropsch ===
The Fischer–Tropsch (FT) process is a gas-to-liquid (GtL) process. When biomass is the source of the gas production the process is also referred to as biomass-to-liquids (BTL). A disadvantage of this process is the high energy investment for the FT synthesis and consequently, the process is not yet economic.

- FT diesel can be mixed with fossil diesel at any percentage without need for infrastructure change and moreover, synthetic kerosene can be produced

=== Biocatalysis ===
- Biohydrogen might be accomplished with some organisms that produce hydrogen directly under certain conditions. Biohydrogen can be used in fuel cells to produce electricity.
- Butanol and Isobutanol via recombinant pathways expressed in hosts such as E. coli and yeast, butanol and isobutanol may be significant products of fermentation using glucose as a carbon and energy source.
- DMF (2,5-Dimethylfuran). Recent advances in producing DMF from fructose and glucose using catalytic biomass-to-liquid process have increased its attractiveness.

=== Other processes ===
- HTU (Hydro Thermal Upgrading) diesel is produced from wet biomass. It can be mixed with fossil diesel in any percentage without need for infrastructure.
- Wood diesel. A new biofuel was developed by the University of Georgia from woodchips. The oil is extracted and then added to unmodified diesel engines. Either new plants are used or planted to replace the old plants. The charcoal byproduct is put back into the soil as a fertilizer. According to the director Tom Adams since carbon is put back into the soil, this biofuel can actually be carbon negative not just carbon neutral. Carbon negative decreases carbon dioxide in the air reversing the greenhouse effect not just reducing it.

== Second Generation Feedstocks ==
To qualify as a second generation feedstock, a source must not be suitable for human consumption. Second-generation biofuel feedstocks include specifically grown inedible energy crops, cultivated inedible oils, agricultural and municipal wastes, waste oils, and algae. Nevertheless, cereal and sugar crops are also used as feedstocks to second-generation processing technologies. Land use, existing biomass industries and relevant conversion technologies must be considered when evaluating suitability of developing biomass as feedstock for energy.

=== Energy crops ===
Plants are made from lignin, hemicellulose and cellulose; second-generation technology uses one, two or all of these components. Common lignocellulosic energy crops include wheat straw, Arundo donax, Miscanthus spp., short rotation coppice poplar and willow. However, each offers different opportunities and no one crop can be considered 'best' or 'worst'.

When choosing which energy crops to plant, it is important to consider their overall environmental impact. For example, certain biofuel grasses are invasive in North America, so these must be avoided. Native or proven non-invasive plants are preferred, especially since native plants tend to provide more ecosystem services. Further considerations should include a life cycle analysis to compare the total carbon footprint of several crop options. Life cycle analyses can also include impacts on soil and water in the surrounding area.

=== Municipal solid waste ===
Municipal Solid Waste comprises a very large range of materials, and total waste arisings are increasing. In the UK, recycling initiatives decrease the proportion of waste going straight for disposal, and the level of recycling is increasing each year. However, there remains significant opportunities to convert this waste to fuel via gasification or pyrolysis.

Household and commercial food waste may be turned into bioethanol and biomethane. Bioethanol can then be used to fuel vehicles, while biomethane can be used in place of the fossil fuel natural gas.

=== Green waste ===
Green waste such as forest residues or garden or park waste may be used to produce biofuel via different routes. Examples include Biogas captured from biodegradable green waste, and gasification or hydrolysis to syngas for further processing to biofuels via catalytic processes.

=== Black liquor ===
Black liquor, the spent cooking liquor from the kraft process that contains concentrated lignin and hemicellulose, may be gasified with very high conversion efficiency and greenhouse gas reduction potential to produce syngas for further synthesis to e.g. biomethanol or BioDME.

The yield of crude tall oil from process is in the range of 30 – 50 kg / ton pulp.

== Greenhouse gas emissions ==
Lignocellulosic biofuels reduces greenhouse gas emissions by 60–90% when compared with fossil petroleum (Börjesson.P. et al. 2013. Dagens och framtidens hållbara biodrivmedel), which is on par with the better of current biofuels of the first-generation, where typical best values currently is 60–80%. In 2010, average savings of biofuels used within EU was 60% (Hamelinck.C. et al. 2013 Renewable energy progress and biofuels sustainability, Report for the European Commission). In 2013, 70% of the biofuels used in Sweden reduced emissions with 66% or higher. (Energimyndigheten 2014. Hållbara biodrivmedel och flytande biobränslen 2013).

== Commercial development ==
An operating lignocellulosic ethanol production plant is located in Canada, run by Iogen Corporation. The demonstration-scale plant produces around 700,000 litres of bioethanol each year. A commercial plant is under construction. Many further lignocellulosic ethanol plants have been proposed in North America and around the world.

The Swedish specialty cellulose mill Domsjö Fabriker in Örnsköldsvik, Sweden develops a biorefinery using Chemrec's black liquor gasification technology. When commissioned in 2015 the biorefinery will produce 140,000 tons of biomethanol or 100,000 tons of BioDME per year, replacing 2% of Sweden's imports of diesel fuel for transportation purposes. In May 2012 it was revealed that Domsjö pulled out of the project, effectively killing the effort.

In the UK, companies like Ineos Bio and British Airways are developing advanced biofuel refineries, which are due to be built by 2013 and 2014 respectively. Under favourable economic conditions and strong improvements in policy support, NNFCC projections suggest advanced biofuels could meet up to 4.3 per cent of the UK's transport fuel by 2020 and save 3.2 million tonnes of CO_{2} each year, equivalent to taking nearly a million cars off the road.

Helsinki, Finland, 1 February 2012 – UPM is to invest in a biorefinery producing biofuels from crude tall oil in Lappeenranta, Finland. The industrial scale investment is the first of its kind globally. The biorefinery will produce annually approximately 100,000 tonnes of advanced second-generation biodiesel for transport. Construction of the biorefinery will begin in the summer of 2012 at UPM's Kaukas mill site and be completed in 2014. UPM's total investment will amount to approximately EUR 150 million.

Calgary, Alberta, 30 April 2012 – Iogen Energy Corporation has agreed to a new plan with its joint owners Royal Dutch Shell and Iogen Corporation to refocus its strategy and activities. Shell continues to explore multiple pathways to find a commercial solution for the production of advanced biofuels on an industrial scale, but the company will NOT pursue the project it has had under development to build a larger scale cellulosic ethanol facility in southern Manitoba.

In India, Indian Oil Companies have agreed to build seven second generation refineries across the country. The companies who will be participating in building of 2G biofuel plants are Indian Oil Corporation (IOCL), HPCL and BPCL. In May 2018, the Government of India unveiled a biofuel policy wherein a sum of INR 5,000 crores was allocated to set-up 2G biorefineries. Indian oil marketing companies were in a process of constructing 12 refineries with a capex of INR 10,000 crores.

== See also ==
- Algae fuel
- Cellulosic ethanol commercialization
- Food vs fuel
- IEA Bioenergy
- Jatropha
- Renewable Fuel Standard
