= West Elgin Secondary School =

Location
- 139 Graham Street; West Lorne, Ontario, N0L 2P0; Canada; 42.59809°N 81.59826°W

Information
- School type: Secondary Highschool
- Motto: "Non scholae sed vitae discimus" ("We learn not for learning alone, but for life")
- Founded: 1952
- School board: Thames Valley District School Board
- Principal: M. Saunders
- Grades: 9–12
- Enrollment: 265 (2019/2020)
- Area: Elgin County
- Colours: Purple and White
- Mascot: Willie the Wildcat
- Team name: Wildcats
- Website: westelgin.tvdsb.ca/en/index.aspx

West Elgin Secondary School is a secondary school, located at 139 Graham Street in West Lorne, Ontario. It serves the rural area of West Elgin, including West Lorne, Rodney, Dutton/Dunwich, Wallacetown and Iona Station. WESS is part of the Thames Valley District School Board.

== See also ==
- Education in Ontario
- List of secondary schools in Ontario
