= Pyrolysis oil =

Petroleum substitute

Pyrolysis oil, sometimes also known as biocrude or bio-oil, is a synthetic fuel with few industrial applications and under investigation as substitute for petroleum. It is obtained by heating dried biomass without oxygen in a reactor at a temperature of about 500 °C (900 °F) with subsequent cooling, separation from the aqueous phase and other processes. Pyrolysis oil is a kind of tar and normally contains levels of oxygen too high to be considered a pure hydrocarbon. This high oxygen content results in non-volatility, corrosiveness, partial miscibility with fossil fuels, thermal instability, and a tendency to polymerize when exposed to air. As such, it is distinctly different from petroleum products. Removing oxygen from bio-oil or nitrogen from algal bio-oil is known as upgrading.

== Standards ==
There are few standards for pyrolysis oil because of few efforts to produce it. One is from ASTM.

== Feedstock decomposition ==
Pyrolysis is a well established technique for decomposition of organic material at elevated temperatures in the absence of oxygen into oil and other constituents. In second-generation biofuel applications—forest and agricultural residues, waste wood, yard waste, and energy crops can be used as feedstock.

=== Wood ===
Derivation of a wood-tar creosote from resinous woods

==== Historical wood gasification ====
Syngas, historically called "manufactured gas" or simply "gas" was made by the gasification of combustible materials, usually coal—but also wood—by heating the material in retorts or enclosed ovens with an oxygen-poor atmosphere. In the modern context of creating pyrolysis oil from wood feedstock, the syngas produced during the process is primarily used as fuel to provide the heat required for the pyrolysis reactor.

==== Modern pyrolysis plants ====
- Process Energy: The energy required to run a "fast" pyrolyzer (which maximizes liquid oil yield) is approximately 15% of the total energy it outputs.
- Self-Sustaining Operation: Modern plants recycle the non-condensable syngas—a mixture of hydrogen, carbon monoxide, and methane—to be burned as a heat source. This allows the system to output 3 to 9 times the amount of energy required to operate.
- By-product Utility: During fast pyrolysis, wood is typically converted into roughly 60% bio-oil, 20% biochar, and 20% syngas. While the bio-oil is the primary liquid product sought for fuel or chemical use, the syngas is essential for the thermal decomposition stage, where wood is heated to around 500 °C (932 °F) in an oxygen-poor atmosphere.

==== Wood decomposition ====
When wood is heated above 270 °C (518 °F) it begins a process of decomposition called carbonization. In the absence of oxygen, the final product is charcoal. If sufficient oxygen is present, the wood will burn when it reaches a temperature of about 400–500 °C (752–932 °F) leaving wood ash behind. If wood is heated away from air, the moisture is first driven off and until this is complete, the wood temperature remains at about 100–110 °C (212–230 °F). When the wood is dry its temperature rises, and at about 270 °C (518 °F) it begins to spontaneously decompose and generate heat. This is the well known exothermic reaction which takes place in the burning of charcoal. At this stage evolution of carbonization by-products starts. These substances are given off gradually as the temperature rises and at about 450 °C (842 °F) the evolution is complete.

The solid residue, charcoal, is mainly carbon (about 70%), with the remainder being tar-like substances which can be driven off or decomposed completely only by raising the temperature to above about 600 °C to produce biochar, a high-carbon, fine-grained residue that today is produced through modern pyrolysis processes, which is the direct thermal decomposition of biomass in the absence of oxygen, which prevents combustion, to obtain an array of solid (biochar), liquid—Pyrolysis oil (bio-oil/pyrolysis-oil), and gas (syngas) products. The specific yield from the pyrolysis is dependent on process conditions. such as temperature, and can be optimized to produce either energy or biochar. Temperatures of 400–500 °C (752–932 °F) produce more char, while temperatures above 700 °C (1,292 °F) favor the yield of liquid and gaseous fuel components. Pyrolysis occurs more quickly at higher temperatures, typically requiring seconds instead of hours. High temperature pyrolysis is also known as gasification, and produces primarily syngas. Typical yields are 60% bio-oil, 20% biochar, and 20% syngas. By comparison, slow pyrolysis can produce substantially more char (~50%). For typical inputs, the energy required to run a “fast” pyrolyzer is approximately 15% of the energy that it outputs. Modern pyrolysis plants can use the syngas created by the pyrolysis process and output 3–9 times the amount of energy required to run.

=== Algae ===
Algae may be subjected to high temperatures (~500 °C) and normal atmospheric pressures. The resultant products include oil and nutrients such as nitrogen, phosphorus, and potassium.

There are numerous papers on the pyrolysis of lignocellulosic biomass. However, very few reports are available for algal bio-oil production via pyrolysis. Miao et al. (2004b) performed fast pyrolysis of Chllorella protothecoides and Microcystis areuginosa at 500 °C, and bio-oil yields of 18% and 24% were obtained, respectively. The bio-oil exhibited a higher carbon and nitrogen content, lower oxygen content than wood bio-oil. When Chlorella protothecoides was cultivated heterotrophically, bio-oil yield increased to 57.9% with a heating value of 41 MJ/kg (Miao et al., 2004a). Recently when microalgae become a hot research topic as the third generation of biofuel, pyrolysis has drawn more attention as a potential conversion method for algal biofuel production. Pan et al. (2010) investigated slow pyrolysis of Nannochloropsis sp. residue with and without the presence of HZSM-5 catalyst and obtained bio-oil rich in aromatic hydrocarbons from catalytic pyrolysis. Algal pyrolytic liquids separate into two phases with the top phase called bio-oil (Campanella et al., 2012; Jena et al., 2011a). The higher heating values (HHV) of algal bio-oil are in the range of 31−36 MJ/kg, generally higher than those of lignocellulosic feedstocks. Pyrolytic bio-oil consists of compounds with lower mean molecular weights and contains more low boiling compounds than bio-oil produced by hydrothermal liquefaction. These properties are similar to those of Illinois shale oil (Jena et al., 2011a; Vardon et al., 2012), which may indicate that pyrolytic bio-oil is suited for replacing petroleum. In addition, the high protein content in microalgae led to a high N content in the bio-oil, resulting in undesirable NOx emissions during combustion and deactivation of acidic catalysts when co-processed in existing 10 crude oil refineries. Algal bio-oil had better qualities in many aspects than those produced from lignocellulosic biomass. For example, algal bio-oil has a higher heating value, a lower oxygen content and a greater than 7 pH value. However, upgrading towards the removal of nitrogen and oxygen in the bio-oil is still necessary before it can be used as drop-in fuels.

==== Hydrothermal liquefaction ====
Hydrothermal liquefaction (HTL) is a thermal depolymerization process used to convert wet biomass into an oil—sometimes referred to as bio-oil or biocrude—under a moderate temperature and high pressure of 350 °C (662 °F) and 3,000 pounds per square inch (21,000 kPa). The crude-like oil (or bio-oil) has high energy density with a lower heating value of 33.8-36.9 MJ/kg and 5-20 wt% oxygen and renewable chemicals.

The HTL process differs from pyrolysis as it can process wet biomass and produce a bio-oil that contains approximately twice the energy density of pyrolysis oil. Pyrolysis is a related process to HTL, but biomass must be processed and dried in order to increase the yield. The presence of water in pyrolysis drastically increases the heat of vaporization of the organic material, increasing the energy required to decompose the biomass. Typical pyrolysis processes require a water content of less than 40% to suitably convert the biomass to bio-oil. This requires considerable pretreatment of wet biomass such as tropical grasses, which contain a water content as high as 80-85%, and even further treatment for aquatic species, which can contain higher than 90% water content. The properties of the resulting bio-oil are affected by temperature, reaction time, algae species, algae concentration, reaction atmosphere, and catalysts, in subcritical water reaction conditions.

== Biocrude ==
Bio-oil typically requires significant additional treatment to render it suitable as a refinery feedstock to replace crude oil derived from petroleum, coal-oil, or coal-tar.

Tar is a black mixture of hydrocarbons and free carbon obtained from a wide variety of organic materials through destructive distillation. Tar can be produced from coal, wood, petroleum, or peat.

- Pine tar is a sticky material produced by the high temperature carbonization of pine wood in anoxic conditions (dry distillation or destructive distillation). The wood is rapidly decomposed by applying heat and pressure in a closed container; the primary resulting products are charcoal and pine tar. Pine tar consists primarily of aromatic hydrocarbons, tar acids and tar bases. Components of tar vary according to the pyrolytic process (e.g. method, duration, temperature) and origin of the wood (e.g. age of pine trees, type of soil and moisture conditions during tree growth).
- Birch tar is a substance (liquid when heated) derived from the dry distillation of the bark of the birch tree. It is compounded of phenols such as guaiacol, cresol, xylenol and creosol (not to be confused with cresol).

Wood-tar creosote is a colourless to yellowish greasy liquid with a smoky odor, produces a sooty flame when burned, and has a burned taste. It is non-buoyant in water, with a specific gravity of 1.037 to 1.087, retains fluidity at a very low temperature, and boils at 205–225 °C. When transparent, it is in its purest form. Dissolution in water requires up to 200 times the amount of water as the base creosote. The creosote is a combination of natural phenols: primarily guaiacol and creosol (4-methylguaiacol), which will typically constitute 50% of the oil; second in prevalence, cresol and xylenol; the rest being a combination of monophenols and polyphenols.

Pitch is a name for any of a number of viscoelastic polymers. Pitch can be natural or manufactured, derived from petroleum, coal tar or plants.

Black liquor and tall oil is a viscous liquid by-product of wood pulp manufacturing.

Rubber oil is the product of the pyrolysis method for recycling used tires.

== Biofuel ==
Biofuels are synthesized from intermediary products such as syngas using methods that are identical in processes involving conventional feedstocks, first generation and second generation biofuels. The distinguishing feature is the technology involved in producing the intermediary product, rather than the ultimate off-take.

A biorefinery is a facility that integrates biomass conversion processes and equipment to produce fuels, power, heat, and value-added chemicals from biomass. The biorefinery concept is analogous to today's petroleum refinery, which produce multiple fuels and products from petroleum.

- Biodiesel is a diesel fuel derived from animal or plant lipids (oils and fats). A variety of oils can be used as biodiesel feedstock.
- Wood diesel. A new biofuel was developed by the University of Georgia from woodchips. The oil is extracted and then added to unmodified diesel engines. Either new plants are used or planted to replace the old plants. The charcoal byproduct is put back into the soil as a fertilizer. This biofuel can actually be carbon negative not just carbon neutral. Carbon negative processes decrease carbon dioxide in the air reversing the greenhouse effect not just reducing it.
- Algae fuels, can be produced from various types of algae, and are dependent on the technique and the part of the cells used, some species of algae can produce 50% or more of their dry weight in the form of oil. The lipid, or oily part of the algae biomass can be extracted and converted into biodiesel through a process similar to that used for any other vegetable oil, or converted in a refinery into "drop-in" replacements for petroleum-based fuels. Algaculture can use waste materials such as sewage and without displacing land currently used for food production.

== Atmospheric carbon dioxide removal ==
Bio-oil is a recent contender technique for carbon sequestration. Corn stalks are converted by pyrolysis into bio-oil, which is then pumped underground.

== Industrial applications ==
Currently, bio-oil has few industrial uses. A reported application is in the production of zinc oxide as thermal source. In this use, the fuel has substituted for heavy fuel oils as a biogenic source of heat. The bio-oil is used in the kiln burners as a direct substitute with little to no change in the operational results. The fuel has higher water and oxygen content which makes a higher volumetric flow for the same heat capacity.

== See also ==
- Biodiesel
- Creosote
- Hydrodeoxygenation
- Algae fuel
- Dry distillation
- Biofuel
- Second-generation biofuels
- Tar
- Oil of brick
- Plastic-to-Liquid
