= Nine oils =

Medication used to relieve aches

In the 19th century, the nine oils was a preparation, or liniment, which was rubbed into the skin to relieve aches, such as over bruises. "Nine oils" was apparently developed in veterinary medicine, for treating horses, but later was adopted for human medical use.

According to one 19th-century druggists' book, oils used in the preparation included:

- train oil; that is, whale oil or the oil of the blubber of another marine mammal
- oil of turpentine
- oil of bricks, the oil obtained by the distillation of pieces of brick saturated with rapeseed oil or olive oil
- oil of amber
- spirit of camphor
- Barbados tar, a kind of greenish petroleum found in Barbados
- oil of vitriol; that is, sulfuric acid

However, it is certain that many "nine oils" preparations did not contain these ingredients, and in fact it is possible that the name "nine oils" never referred to any specific combination of compounds. The writer James Greenwood, in 1883, put these words in the mouth of the street-doctor "Dr. Quackinbosh", in his series of articles Toilers in London, by One of the Crowd, originally serialized in The Daily Telegraph:

When I first started I worked Woolwich with my "miraculous Nine Oils." Men who work at heavy lifting and hauling, and are likely to get strains and ricks of the back, have a superstitious belief in the "Nine Oils." It is the same wherever you go. What are they? what, the original Nine? Blessed if I know, nor they don't know either. But that don't make any difference. I used to give 'em one – sperm oil – and call it the Nine.

== See also ==
- Patent medicine
- Snake oil
