= NNFCC =

Bioenergy consultancy in York, England

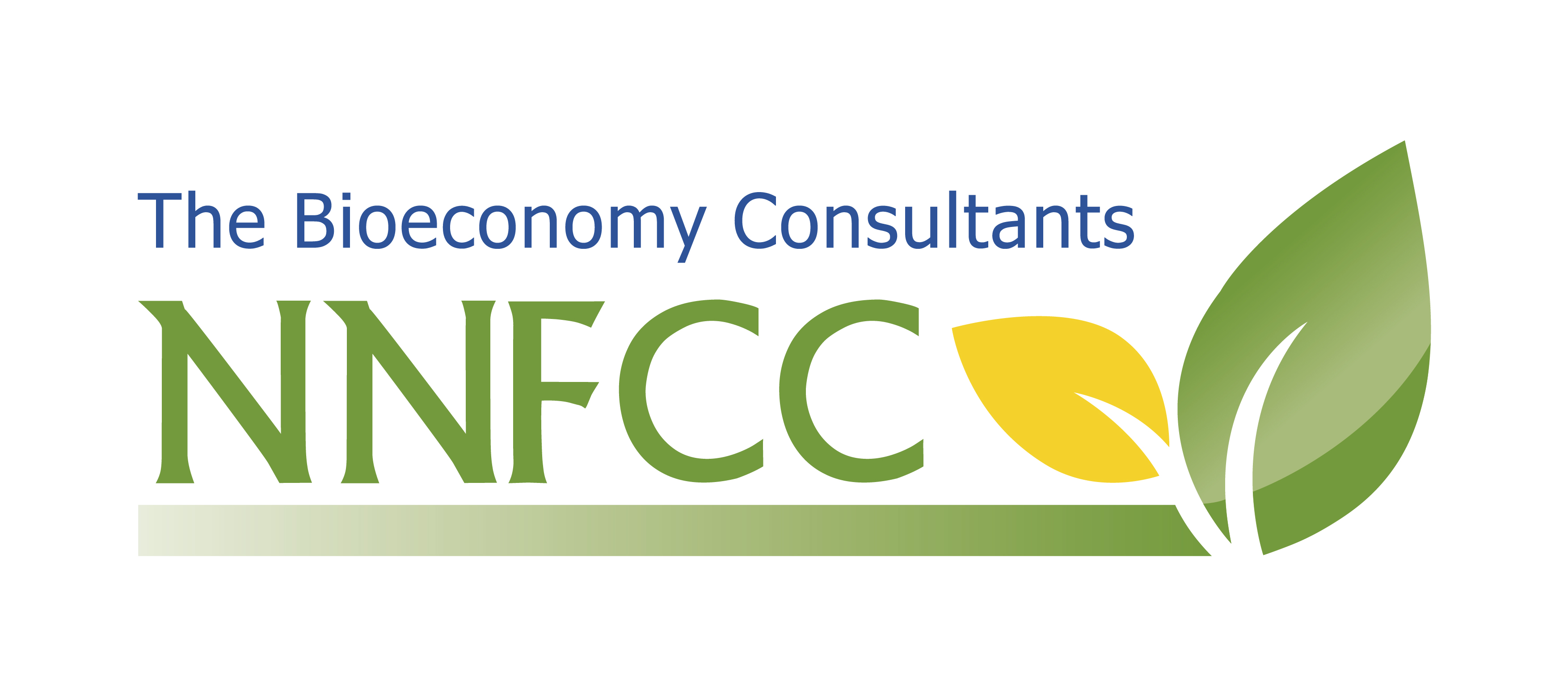
- Abbreviation: NNFCC
- Formation: 2003
- Legal status: Company limited by guarantee
- Location: Biocentre, York Science Park, Innovation Way, York, England
- Region served: United Kingdom
- Managing Director: Dr Adrian Higson
- Affiliations: DECC
- Website: www.nnfcc.co.uk

NNFCC is a consultancy company specialising in bioenergy, biofuels and bio-based products.

== History ==
Established by the UK Government in 2003 as the National Non-Food Crops Centre (NNFCC) to help extend the competitive non-food uses of crops, NNFCC is now an international consultancy providing advice on the conversion of biomass to bioenergy, biofuels and bio-based products.

The company is based in the BioCentre on the York Science Park and was opened in November 2003 by Larry Whitty, Baron Whitty. The current Managing Director is Dr Adrian Higson.

== Company information ==
NNFCC specialises in providing information and knowledge on the supply of biomass, its use in industrial applications and the fate of biomaterials at their end-of-life.

NNFCC operate in five separate sectors:

- Feedstock
- Bioenergy
- Biofuels
- Bio-based products
- Biorefining

The company undertakes consultancy for a wide range of organisations, including British Airways, Ineos, BASF, Braskem and NatureWorks. NNFCC also receive funding and is a delivery partner for the UK Government's Department for Energy and Climate Change.

In addition to the consultancy offered by NNFCC, the company also have paid membership for businesses and individuals.

== See also ==
- Non-Food Crops
- Advanced Biofuels
- Biofuels
- Bioliquids
- Biomass
- Bioplastic
- Biorefinery
- Anaerobic Digestion
- Hemp
- Vegetable oil
