= Dynamotive Energy Systems =

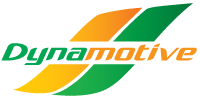
- Type: Public (OTC Pink: DYMTF)
- Industry: Technology, Energy
- Founded: 1991
- Headquarters: Richmond, British Columbia, Canada
- Products: BioOil, BioOil Plus, CQuest
- Subsidiaries: Dynamotive USA; Dynamotive Latinoamericana; First Resources Corporation
- Website: www.dynamotive.com

Dynamotive Energy Systems Corporation is a Canadian based Renewable Energy Company which specializes in fast pyrolysis, a process which creates a product named bio-oil. Its only other residue is char.

== Timeline ==
Dynamotive was incorporated on April 11, 1991 under the laws of the Province of British Columbia. The Company changed its name from Dynamotive Technologies Corporation on June 26, 2001.

2000 BioOil patent acquired from Resource Transforms Ltd. (RTI). Dynamotive designs and builds 10 tonnes per day (tpd) commercial demonstration plant, (picture of pilot plant) Dynamotive completes gas turbine tests

2001 Commission of 10 tpd commercial demonstration plant, upgraded to 15 tpd, TECNA validation of technology

2002 Design and development of a 100 tpd plant

2003 Construction started for 100 tpd plant at Erie Flooring and Wood Products, West Lorne, Ontario in partnership with UMA Engineering, Ontario Power Generation, and Magellan Aerospace (Picture of West Lorne Plant)

2005 Completion of the first commercial plant (West Lorne, Ontario) and launch of full commercialization of Dynamotive’s technology First commercial shipments of BioOil

2006 Ground breaking for 200 tpd BioOil plant in Guelph, Ontario Entry into strategic partnership with Consensus Business Group Fabrication and procurement of two 200 tpd plants to be located in Canada R&D offices & laboratory opened on University of Waterloo campus, Ontario, Canada Continued international expansion through Australian master license

2007 Dynamotive launches higher energy content renewable fuel - BioOil Plus Dynamotive opens offices in United States and Argentina

2008 The British Columbia Securities Commission issues a cease trade order due to Dynamotive's failure to publish financial statements.

== Products ==
=== Mobile Fuels ===
In July 2005 Dynamotive signed an agreement to initiate research on the gasification of BioOil at the University of Western Ontario, Department of Chemical and Biochemical Engineering. The research project involves the development of a process for gasification of BioOil by catalytic steam reforming to produce syngas and/or hydrogen. Syngas can be further converted into synthetic diesel, a renewable, greenhouse gas neutral fuel that can replace hydrocarbon diesel. With the escalating cost of fossil fuels and the dependence on crude oil as the primary source of energy for automobiles, it has become increasingly important to develop synthetic fuels.

In April 2009 Dynamotive successfully produced renewable gasoline and diesel from biomass at its research facility in Waterloo, Ontario through a novel two-stage upgrading process of its pyrolysis oil, BioOil. The BINGO (Biomass INto GasOil) process involves pyrolysis of lignocellulosic biomass to produce a primary liquid fuel, BioOil, which is then hydroreformed to a Stage 1 gas-oil equivalent liquid fuel that can either be directly utilized in blends with hydrocarbon fuels for industrial stationary power and heating applications or be further upgraded to transportation grade liquid hydrocarbon fuels (gasoline/diesel) in a Stage 2 hydrotreating process.

=== CQuest ===
The major by-product from lingo-cellulosic biomass pyrolysis is Biochar which has emerging value for soil productivity enhancement and carbon sequestration. Dynamotive markets its Biochar under the trade name CQuestTM.

On May 12, 2009 Dynamotive released the results of a year-long test applying Dynamotive’s CQuest Biochar in commercial farming test plots. The tests revealed an overall increase in crop yield from 6 percent to 17 percent in plots where biochar was applied versus the control plots.

=== BioOil ===
BioOil is an industrial fuel produced from cellulose waste material. When combusted it produces substantially less smog-precursor nitrogen oxide ('NOx') emissions than conventional oil as well as little or no sulfur oxide gases ('SOx'), which are a prime cause of acid rain. BioOil and BioOil Plus are price-competitive replacements for heating oils #2 and #6 that are widely used in industrial boilers and furnace. They have been EcoLogo certified, having met stringent environmental criteria for industrial fuels as measured by Environment Canada's Environmental Choice Program. BioOil can be produced from a variety of residue cellulosic biomass resources and is not dependent on food-crop production.

== West Lorne ==
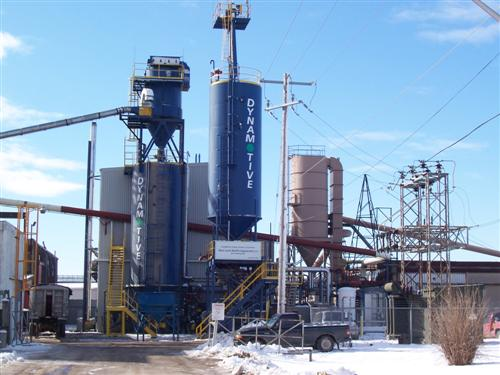
Dynamotive's 130tpd plant in West Lorne, Ontario

In April 2005 Dynamotive completed its first Demonstration scale plant at West Lorne. This plant at the time could create up to 100tpd. The West Lorne BioOil Cogeneration Project (the first of its kind for pyrolysis technology) is partially funded with a Cdn $5 million contribution from Sustainable Development Technology Canada (SDTC), a foundation created by the Government of Canada to support the development and demonstration of clean technologies. Additional support was leveraged from consortia members.

In 2007 Dynamotive signed a contract with Ontario Power Authority to supply renewable power under the province's Standard Offer Program ('SOP'). Under the terms of the newly signed contract, Dynamotive would deliver electricity to the grid from its 2.5 MW cogeneration facility at West Lorne. Dynamotive would sell renewable power to the grid at 11 cents per kilowatt hour, or more, for up to 20 years. Fuel for the plant is derived from wood residues from Erie Flooring and Wood Products that are converted to BioOil through Dynamotive's patented fast pyrolysis process. The plant is the first commercial plant of its kind in the world.

By March 2008, The plant had undergone an upgrade process to increase its nominal capacity to 130 tonnes of biomass input per day, a 30% increase in capacity, and to incorporate technological advances that were developed and implemented in Dynamotive's 200 tonne per day capacity plant located in Guelph, Ontario. The plant incorporates a 2.5 megawatt electric cogeneration package developed by Magellan Aerospace.

== Guelph ==
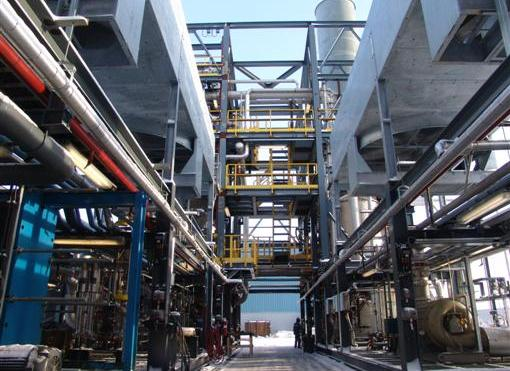
Dynamotive 200tpd plant in Guelph, Ontario

Dynamotive broke ground on October 7, 2006 for the MegaCity Recycling, 200 tonnes per day BioOil plant on a 22-acre (89,000 m^{2}) site in Guelph, Ontario. The plant began producing BioOil in Q1 2007 as it ramped up through its commissioning process. The plant operates under the name Evolution Biofuels Inc. Dynamotive will have a minority ownership position in Evolution Biofuels and will be leasing the pyrolysis unit to the Company. On May 25, 2007 Dynamotive announced that it had completed the initial production run of BioOil in its new generation plant in Guelph, Ontario, Canada. Intermediate grade BioOil, which has higher calorific value than regular BioOil, was produced.
