= West Elgin, Ontario =

West Elgin
- Municipality (lower-tier)
- Municipality of West Elgin
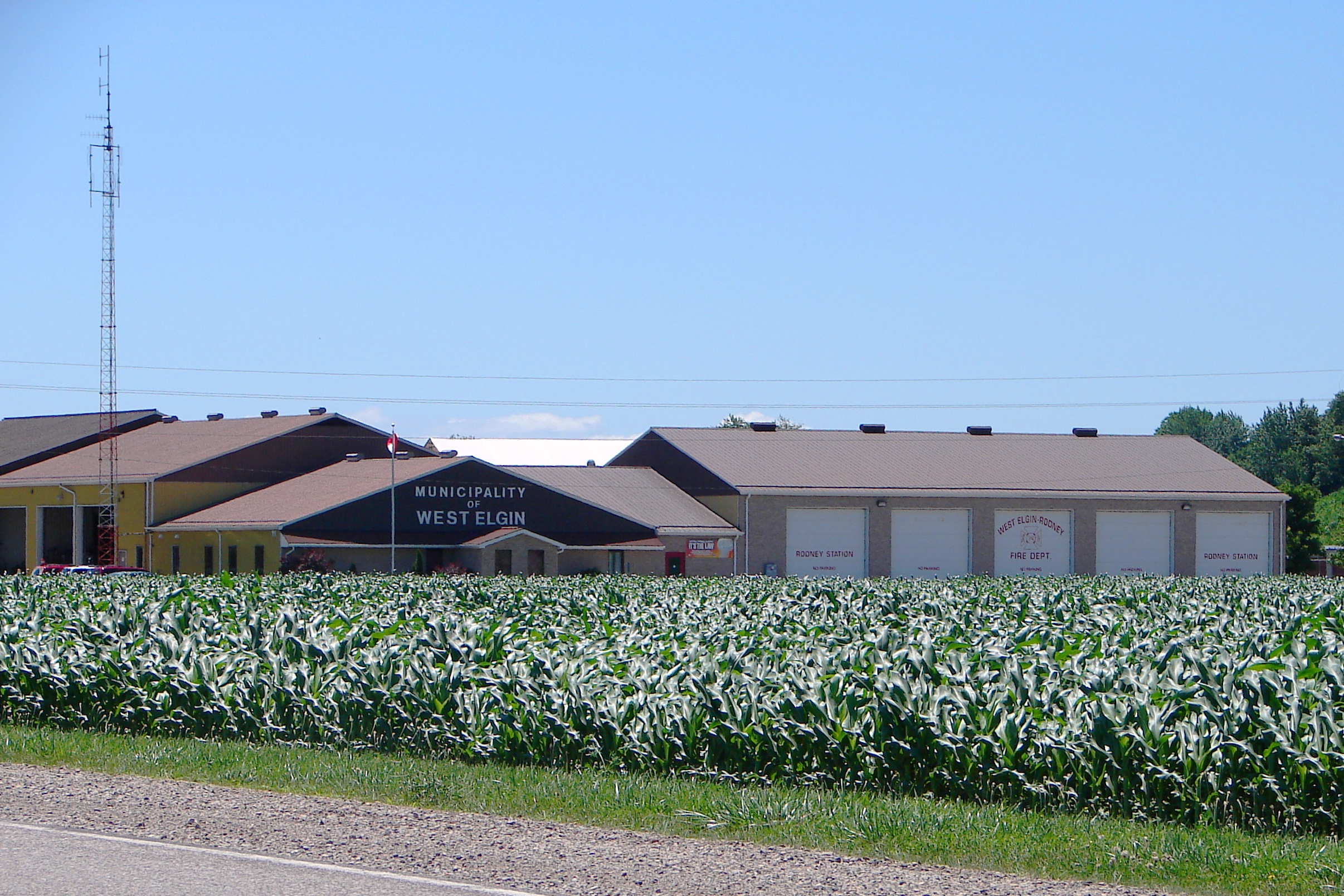
- Municipal office & fire station in Rodney

- Location in Elgin County West Elgin (Southern Ontario)
- Coordinates: 42°35′N 81°40′W
- Country: Canada
- Province: Ontario
- County: Elgin
- Formed: January 1, 1998

Government
  - Mayor: Richard Leatham
  - Federal riding: Elgin—St. Thomas—London South
  - Prov. riding: Elgin—Middlesex—London

Area
  - Land: 322.48 km^{2} (124.51 sq mi)

Population (2016)
  - Total: 4,995
  - Density: 15.5/km^{2} (40/sq mi)
- Time zone: UTC-5 (EST)
  - Summer (DST): UTC-4 (EDT)
- Postal Code: N0L
- Area codes: 519 and 226
- Website: www.westelgin.net

West Elgin is a municipality in Elgin County, Ontario, Canada. The township was created on January 1, 1998, through the amalgamation of the former township of Aldborough with the village of West Lorne.

== Communities ==
The two main population centres within the township are Rodney and West Lorne. Additionally, it also includes the smaller communities of Churchville, Clachan, Ferndell, Crinan, Eagle, Kintyre, New Glasgow, Port Glasgow and Twin Valleys.

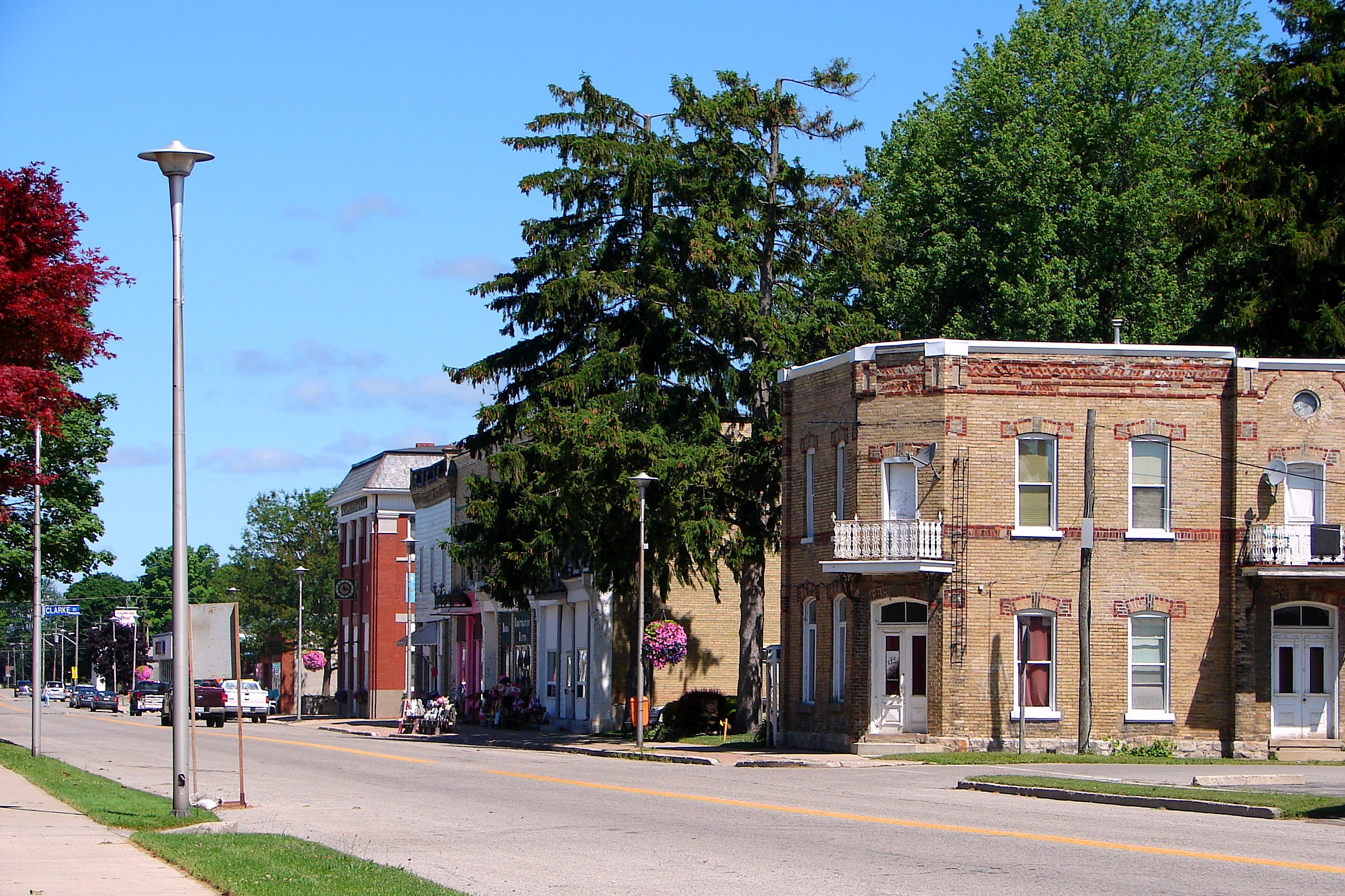
Rodney

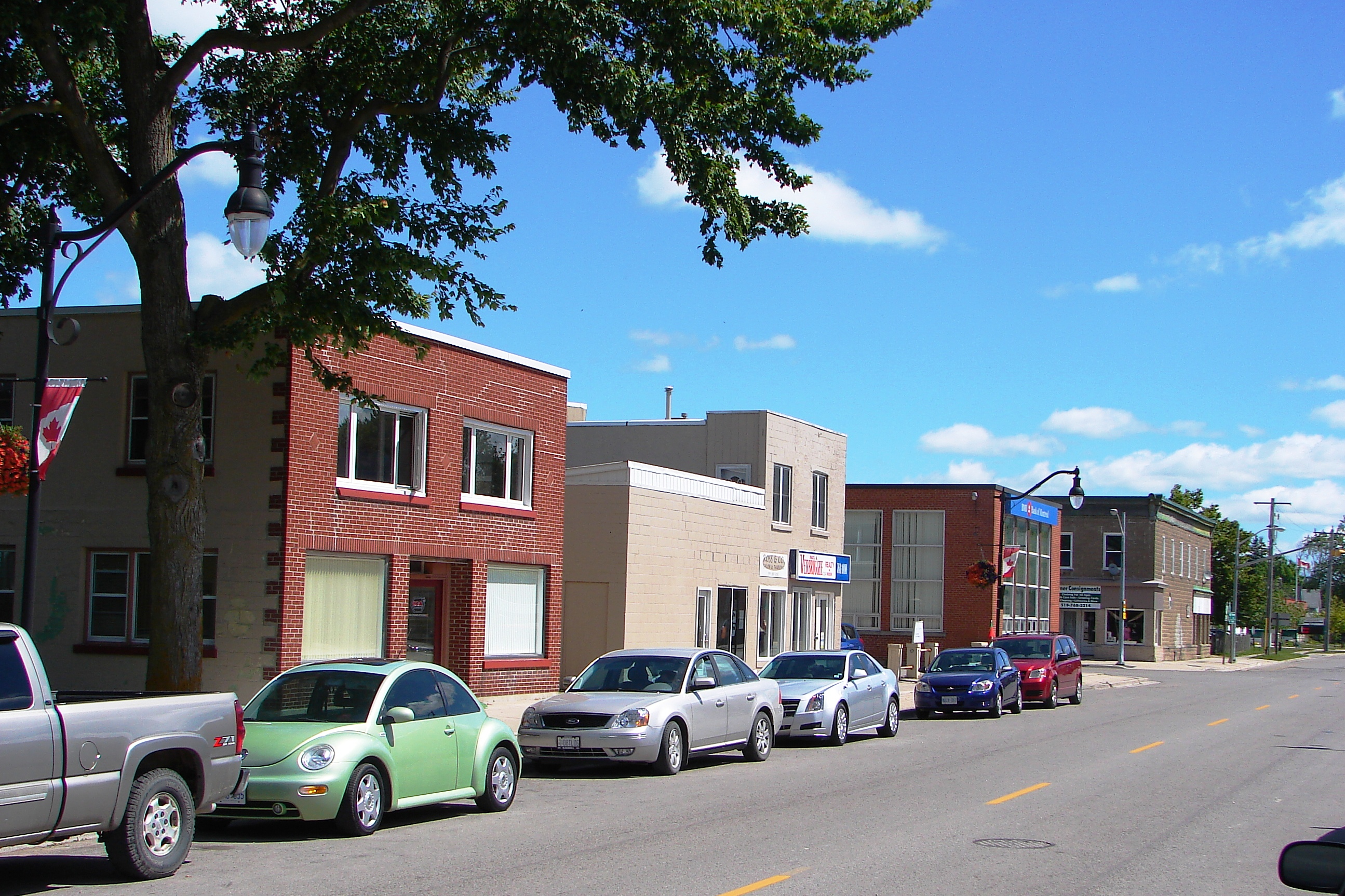
West Lorne

== History ==
The original township of Aldborough was named in 1792 after Aldeburgh, Suffolk, England.

The community of Rodney was originally named Stewart's Mills after the owner of the first sawmill in the community. From 1840 to 1865, it was called Centreville due to its central location at the intersection of Furnival Road and 7th Concession (now Downie Line). In 1865, the community was renamed Rodney after British naval officer George Brydges Rodney. The centre of the village was relocated three kilometres to the south when the Canada Southern Railway was built in the area in 1872.

The community of West Lorne also had its origins the Canada Southern Railway. Originally named Bismarck after the German chancellor, the community was renamed West Clayton, Dutton, Lorne and finally West Lorne. The name came from the Lorne Mills on the south side of the railway, themselves named for John Campbell, Marquess of Lorne. The station itself was renamed West Lorne in 1907 to avoid confusion with a community named Bismarck in Lincoln County.

The villages of Rodney and West Lorne were incorporated as municipalities in 1907 and 1908 respectively, and separated from the township. Subsequently, Aldborough remained a mainly rural municipality.

In 1994, Aldborough and Rodney amalgamated to form an expanded Township of Aldborough. In 1998, Aldborough amalgamated with West Lorne to form West Elgin.

== Climate ==
Climate data for West Elgin, Ontario (Port Glasgow) 1991–2020 normals, extremes 1957–present
Month	Jan	Feb	Mar	Apr	May	Jun	Jul	Aug	Sep	Oct	Nov	Dec	Year
Record high °C (°F)	15.6 (60.1)	19.5 (67.1)	24.0 (75.2)	28.5 (83.3)	32.8 (91.0)	39.0 (102.2)	36.0 (96.8)	36.0 (96.8)	33.5 (92.3)	31.5 (88.7)	24.0 (75.2)	18.0 (64.4)	39.0 (102.2)
Mean daily maximum °C (°F)	−0.6 (30.9)	0.5 (32.9)	5.0 (41.0)	11.7 (53.1)	18.4 (65.1)	23.7 (74.7)	26.2 (79.2)	25.4 (77.7)	22.0 (71.6)	15.3 (59.5)	8.4 (47.1)	2.6 (36.7)	13.2 (55.8)
Daily mean °C (°F)	−4 (25)	−3.3 (26.1)	0.9 (33.6)	7.0 (44.6)	13.5 (56.3)	18.9 (66.0)	21.3 (70.3)	20.5 (68.9)	17.1 (62.8)	11.0 (51.8)	4.8 (40.6)	−0.6 (30.9)	8.9 (48.0)
Mean daily minimum °C (°F)	−7.4 (18.7)	−7.0 (19.4)	−3.1 (26.4)	2.2 (36.0)	8.6 (47.5)	14.1 (57.4)	16.4 (61.5)	15.5 (59.9)	12.2 (54.0)	6.6 (43.9)	1.2 (34.2)	−3.6 (25.5)	4.6 (40.3)
Record low °C (°F)	−29.0 (−20.2)	−26.0 (−14.8)	−24.0 (−11.2)	−12.8 (9.0)	−3.9 (25.0)	−1.1 (30.0)	5.0 (41.0)	2.0 (35.6)	−2.5 (27.5)	−6.7 (19.9)	−16.7 (1.9)	−24.0 (−11.2)	−29.0 (−20.2)
Average precipitation mm (inches)	69.6 (2.74)	56.3 (2.22)	66.0 (2.60)	89.4 (3.52)	89.6 (3.53)	79.1 (3.11)	85.9 (3.38)	73.1 (2.88)	79.7 (3.14)	83.8 (3.30)	83.0 (3.27)	71.6 (2.82)	927.1 (36.50)
Average rainfall mm (inches)	41.7 (1.64)	34.0 (1.34)	53.1 (2.09)	85.8 (3.38)	89.6 (3.53)	79.1 (3.11)	85.9 (3.38)	73.1 (2.88)	79.7 (3.14)	83.4 (3.28)	78.6 (3.09)	52.7 (2.07)	836.6 (32.94)
Average snowfall cm (inches)	27.9 (11.0)	22.3 (8.8)	12.9 (5.1)	3.6 (1.4)	0.0 (0.0)	0.0 (0.0)	0.0 (0.0)	0.0 (0.0)	0.0 (0.0)	0.4 (0.2)	4.4 (1.7)	18.9 (7.4)	90.5 (35.6)
Average precipitation days (≥ 0.2 mm)	12.7	10.0	10.8	12.2	12.1	9.5	10.2	9.5	10.0	11.9	11.6	11.8	132.3
Average rainy days (≥ 0.2 mm)	5.4	4.5	7.7	11.4	12.1	9.5	10.2	9.5	10.0	11.9	10.4	7.7	110.3
Average snowy days (≥ 0.2 cm)	8.2	6.2	4.2	1.2	0.0	0.0	0.0	0.0	0.0	0.13	1.7	5.2	26.7
Source: Environment Canada

== Demographics ==
In the 2021 Census of Population conducted by Statistics Canada, West Elgin had a population of 5,060 living in 2,103 of its 2,221 total private dwellings, a change of 1.3% from its 2016 population of 4,995. With a land area of 322.09 km^{2} (124.36 sq mi), it had a population density of 15.7/km^{2} (40.7/sq mi) in 2021.

Canada census – West Elgin, Ontario community profile

	2016	2011
Population	4,995 (-3.1% from 2011)	5,157 (-3.6% from 2006)
Land area	322.48 km^{2} (124.51 sq mi)	322.52 km^{2} (124.53 sq mi)
Population density	15.5/km^{2} (40/sq mi)	16.0/km^{2} (41/sq mi)
Median age	48.7 (M: 48.9, F: 48.6)	46.5 (M: 46.2, F: 46.9)
Private dwellings	2,221 (total)	2,233 (total)
Median household income	$59,008

References: 2016 2011

Historical population
Year	Pop.	±%
1996	5,573	—
2001	5,464	−2.0%
2006	5,349	−2.1%
2011	5,157	−3.6%
2016	4,995	−3.1%

== Infrastructure ==
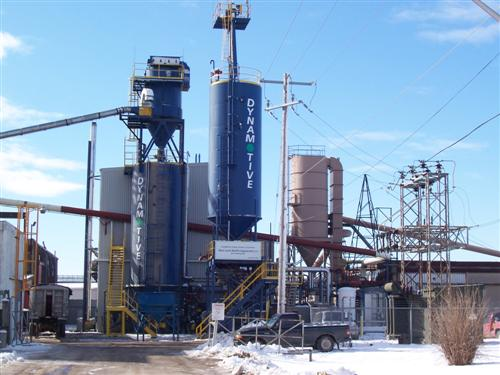
West Lorne is home to Dynamotive Energy Systems bio-oil plant

West Lorne is home to western Elgin County's only high school, West Elgin Secondary School.

West Elgin Secondary school draws in students from West Elgin as well as Middlesex County. The school's mascot is a wildcat and their official colours are white and purple.

West Lorne is linked by Elgin County Road 76 to the 401, a major arterial highway link in Ontario affording easy access to Windsor, Chatham, St. Thomas, London, Brantford, Toronto, and many other places.

Local agriculture includes dairy farming, mixed farming, fruit growing and a sizeable tobacco industry. The town of West Lorne was greatly influenced by the railroad that crossed through the heart of the village. The railroad provided jobs for the first residents of the area. There is also some light manufacturing in the town.

== Notable attractions ==
- Ontario has had some historical claimants, by towns, for the smallest jailhouse in the province. These have included: Tweed, Coboconk and Creemore. However, the jailhouse in Rodney has proven to be smaller than all three, measuring in at 4.5 metres by 5.4 metres. Today, it serves as a part-time tourist information centre. Other villages in Ontario with similar jailhouse dimensions include Port Dalhousie, Providence Bay, and the ghost town of Berens River and Ray.

== Notable people ==
- Bo Horvat, centre for the New York Islanders and former captain of the Vancouver Canucks
- Travis Konecny, centre for the Philadelphia Flyers
- Justin Azevedo, hockey player for Ak Bars Kazan (KHL)

== See also ==
- List of townships in Ontario
- West Lorne Baptist Church
