= West Lorne Baptist Church =

Coordinates: 42.60229°N 81.60408°W

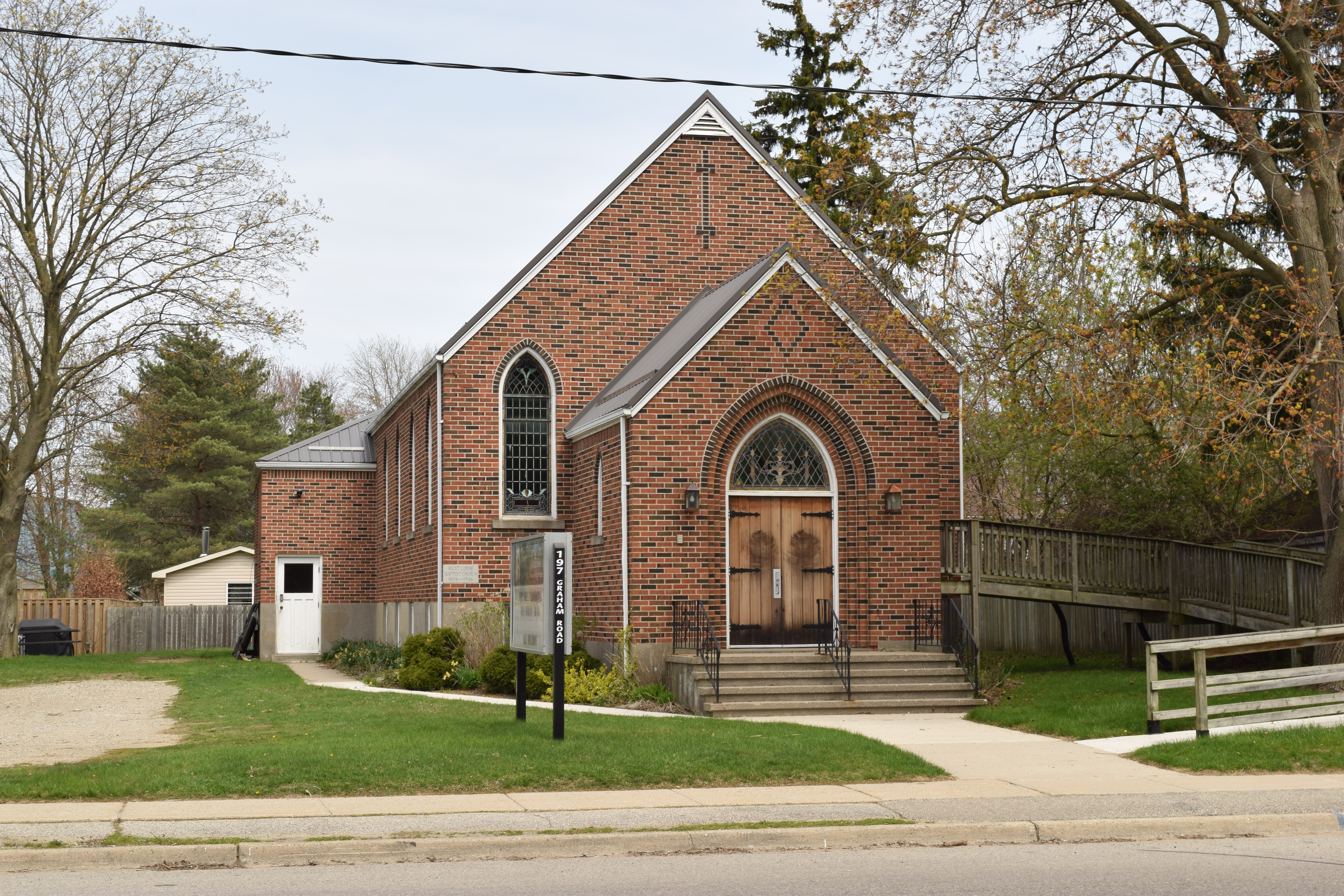
- The West Lorne Baptist Church in April 2026
- West Lorne Baptist Church
- Location: West Lorne, Ontario
- Country: Canada
- Denomination: Baptist
- Website: www.westlornebaptist.ca

History
- Former name(s): The Regular Baptist Church of West Lorne
- Founded: 1876
- Founder: Rev. Peter R. Carey
- Dedicated: February 24, 1878

Clergy
- Pastor: Corey M.K. Hughes

West Lorne Baptist Church is a Baptist church in West Lorne, Ontario, Canada.

== History ==
In 1876 the Baptists met in West Lorne at first in Trigger Hall. The Hall was devoured by fire, and the church moved to Bainard Hall as the next "sanctuary" until the "First" Baptist church was built. It was dedicated on February 24, 1878. A Sunday School began in 1880.

== Building history ==
=== Original building ===
In 1877, Jim McCall was contracted to build the church hall. Edward Evans handcrafted the pews and pulpit. In 1908 an addition was made to the back of the building to accommodate Bible Class.

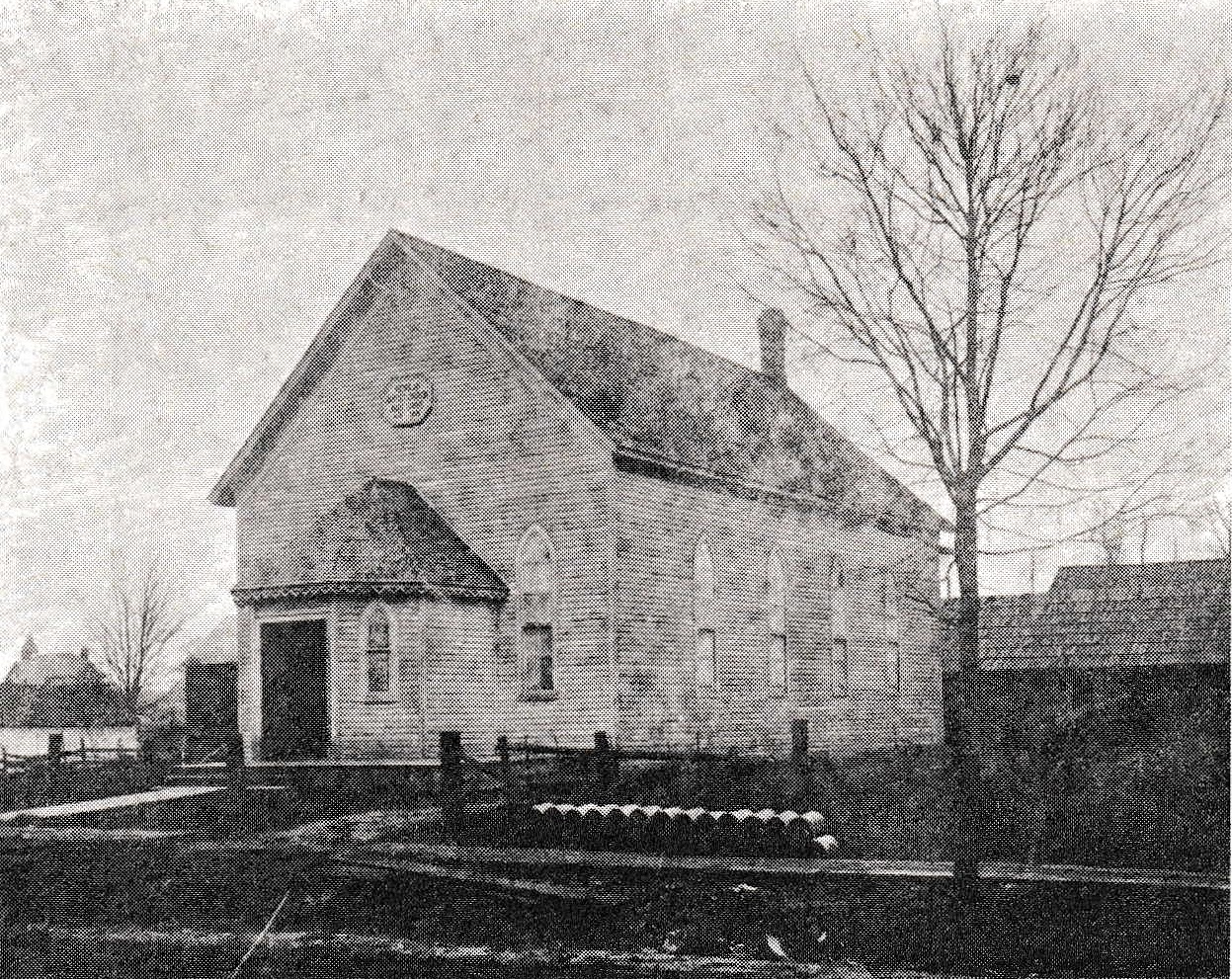
West Lorne Baptist Church 1910

In 1921, a house was purchased and moved onto the lot north of the church building. Reconstruction finished in late 1921 or early 1922. Rev. R. J. McLaren was the first minister to live in it.

On July 31, 1921, a new baptistery was built. Norman Thompson and Mrs. Gammon were among the first to be baptized in it.

On April 21, 1946, at 3am, Mrs. Humphries awakened to discover the church on fire. Pastor Rev. J.F. Ward and the fire department were contacted. When congregants gathered at 7am for the Easter Sunrise service, they discovered the smoldering building. Arson was suspected.

=== Second building ===
Following the fire, Isaac Lambert drew up plans for a new building on Graham St. Frank Haviland donated the steel for the construction. On April 20, 1947, Rev. J. Frank Ward with Rev. D. A. Burns conducted the Re-Opening services both morning and evening.
