= Helix of sustainability =

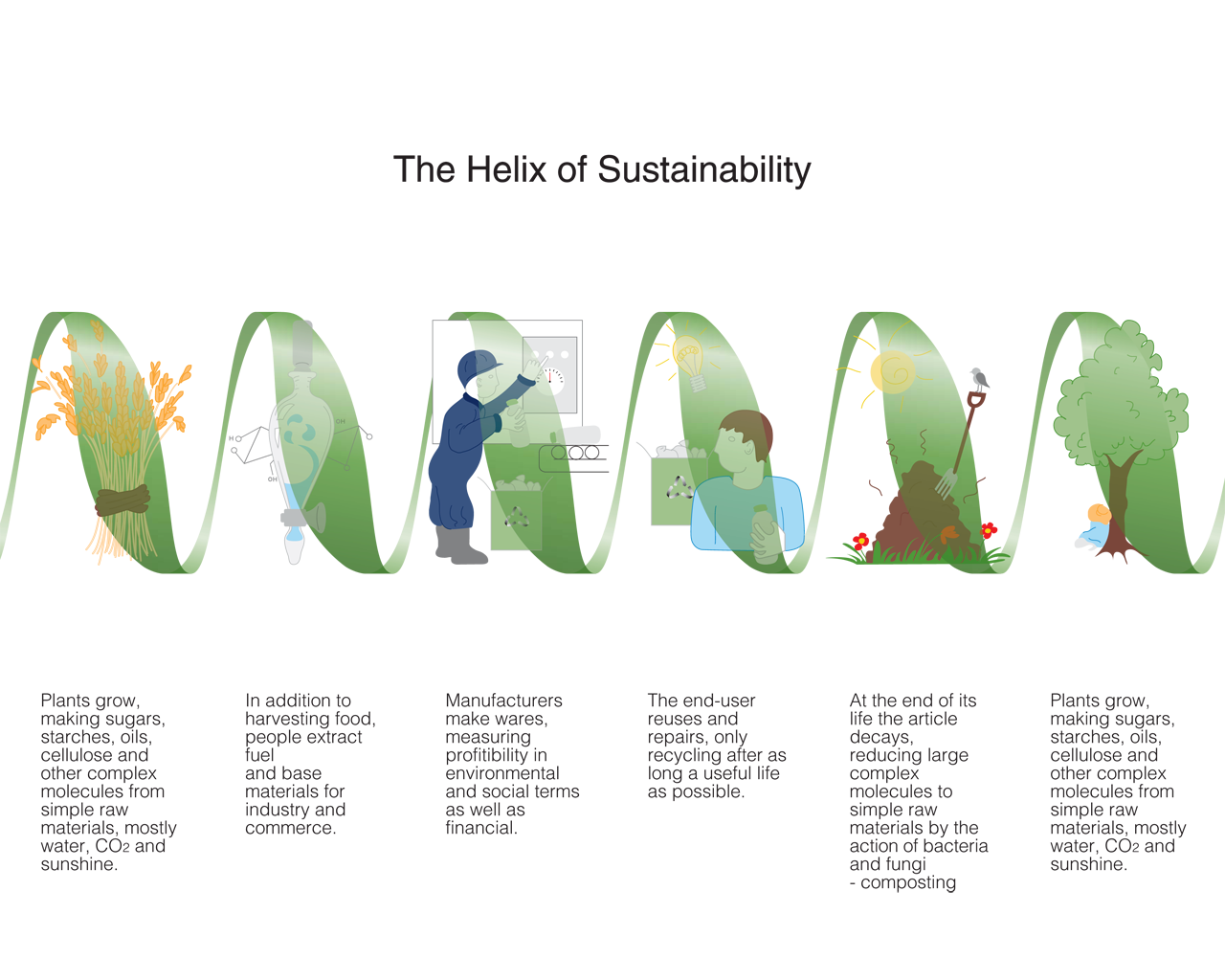
The helix of sustainability - the Carbon cycle ideal for manufacture and use.

The international recycling symbol - not nature identical.

The helix of sustainability is a concept coined to help the manufacturing industry move to more sustainable practices by mapping its models of raw material use and reuse onto those of nature. The environmental benefits of the use crop origin sustainable materials have been assumed to be self-evident, but as the debate on food vs fuel shows, the whole product life cycle must be examined in the light of social and environmental effects in addition to technical suitability and profitability.

== History ==
The helix of sustainability is a concept created as a representation of the total systems approach to gain full advantage from manufacturing with sustainable materials, particularly biopolymers and biocomposites. In 2004, the concept was presented by Professor John Wood, then Chair of the Materials Foresight Panel at a DTI event hosted by the then Secretary of State for Industry (Jacqui Smith). In the same year, it was also used in the European Science Foundation exploratory workshop on environmentally friendly composites.

== Advantages ==
The advantages of working with crop origin raw materials are readily observed if the social and environmental impacts are considered as well as monetary cost (the Triple bottom line), and the helix of sustainability helps to demonstrate this. For the full potential of biopolymers to be realised it is essential that attention is paid to every aspect of the manufacturing process from design (how to cope with the uncertainties in properties associated with crop origin materials?), manufacture (can existing technologies be used?), through to end-of-life (can the redundant article be fed back into the materials cycle?). The entire supply chain must be considered because decisions taken at the design stage have significant effects right through the life of an article.

Low-cost assembly techniques (e.g., snap-fits) may make dismantling or repair uneconomical. However, if say an easy-to-dismantle car is built, will there be any effect on the ability of the vehicle to absorb energy in a crash? At an even more fundamental level, what will be the social and environmental of the change in crop growing patterns? This low environmental impact approach to manufacturing is seen as an extension of waste reduction techniques, such as lean manufacturing.

Conventional cycles of use and reuse are circular. Consider the mechanical recovery of conventional polymers. A complex infrastructure is needed to recover the material at the end of an article's useful life. At the end of an article's life - say a PET carbonated drink bottle, the article must be separated from the waste stream, either by the consumer who throws it away, or by manual labour at the rubbish dump. It must then be transported to some facility to be reprocessed (using more labour and energy) back into a raw material. The heat and shear forces associated with the process of remanufacture tends to produce material with slightly degraded properties compared to the original material.

== Usage ==
For sustainable material articles there is not such a great requirement for a dedicated recovery infrastructure. If a litter lout throws a crop origin biodegradable article on the ground, it will ultimately biodegrade into humus, water, and non-fossil CO_{2}. If the article is placed into a compostable waste stream, the humus can then be used as fertiliser for the next generation of crops; there is also no requirement to sort biopolymer articles as there is with fossil polymer recycling.

Note the difference between landfill and compost: the limited biological activity in landfill is slow and mostly anaerobic, resulting in the production of methane, whereas composting is a rapid aerobic process resulting in humus, water and non-fossil CO_{2}. The energy bill for breaking down biodegradables into the fundamental building block molecules and then reassembling them into usable raw materials is large, but it uses direct solar energy rather than metered electricity. There is also no loss of properties with successive journeys through the cycle.

== See also ==
- Waste hierarchy
- Industrial ecology
- Mottainai
- Biopolymers
- Bioplastics
- Non-food crop
