= Blue Marble Energy =

Blue Marble Biomaterials
- Company type: Private company
- Founded: 2007
- Headquarters: Missoula, Montana
- Key people: James Stephens; CEO & CSO; Dr. Frances Gilman; Senior Vice President
- Website: www.bluemarblebio.com

Blue Marble Biomaterials (formerly Blue Marble Energy), founded in 2007, is a US-based company which utilizes hybridized bacteria to produce specialty biochemicals and renewable biogas. The company develops and generates these biochemicals using non-virgin cellulose as biomass.

Blue Marble Biomaterials is a wholly owned subsidiary of Blue Marble Energy. Blue Marble has publicly announced that they are working with several large national and multi-national partners, including Welch's and Firmenich. Socati Corp., a leading processor of hemp extract with remediated THC, announced on May 15, 2019 that it has acquired Blue Marble Biomaterials, a manufacturer of natural and sustainable specialty compounds for the global food, fragrance and cosmetic sectors. The acquisition marks a major milestone in Socati’s capability to meet the rapidly growing demand for high-quality, hemp-derived ingredients, including CBD and other cannabinoids.

== Facilities ==
In 2011, Blue Marble Energy opened their new Small Commercial Biorefinery located in Missoula, Montana. Missoula was chosen in part due to its rail transportation corridor, readily available green-collar workforce, and proximity to the University of Montana.. Blue Marble opened their Large Commercial Biorefinery in September 2013 with a capacity of 1,000 metric tons (input) and 10,000 to 15,000 kg (final product output) per month.

== Technology ==
Blue Marble’s patented conversion system, Acid, Gas, and Ammonia Targeted Extraction (AGATE), uses non-genetically modified bacteria. It can process a wide variety of organic biomass feedstocks. A single fermentation contains multiple strains of bacteria which specialize in the breakdown of different feedstocks. The resulting consortia of different bacteria "perform well in high nitrogen environments and can withstand shocks to the system (such as changes in pH, temperature, and feedstock). This allows AGATE to process nearly any organic biomass: food waste, yard waste, spent brewery grain, algae, milfoil, corn silage, etc. AGATE can handle both fresh and wet feedstock, and can be adjusted to meet changing economic opportunities and market needs." Through anaerobic digestion and fermentation, the AGATE platform manipulates microbial environments to produce esters, amides, anhydrous ammonia, and rich biogas.

=== Algae Harvesting ===
In the past, Blue Marble Energy participated in aquatic remediation efforts for the Puget Sound and other waterways around Seattle in an effort to repair damaged ocean ecology damaged by harmful algae blooms and invasive species. This water cleanup may be extended to sewage treatment plants and mine sites in the future.

== In the media ==
- Blue Marble Energy was recognized as one of the 100 Hottest Companies in Bioenergy for 2009 by Biofuels Digest.

== See also ==
- Biorefinery
