= Biorefinery =

Refinery that converts biomass to energy and other beneficial byproducts

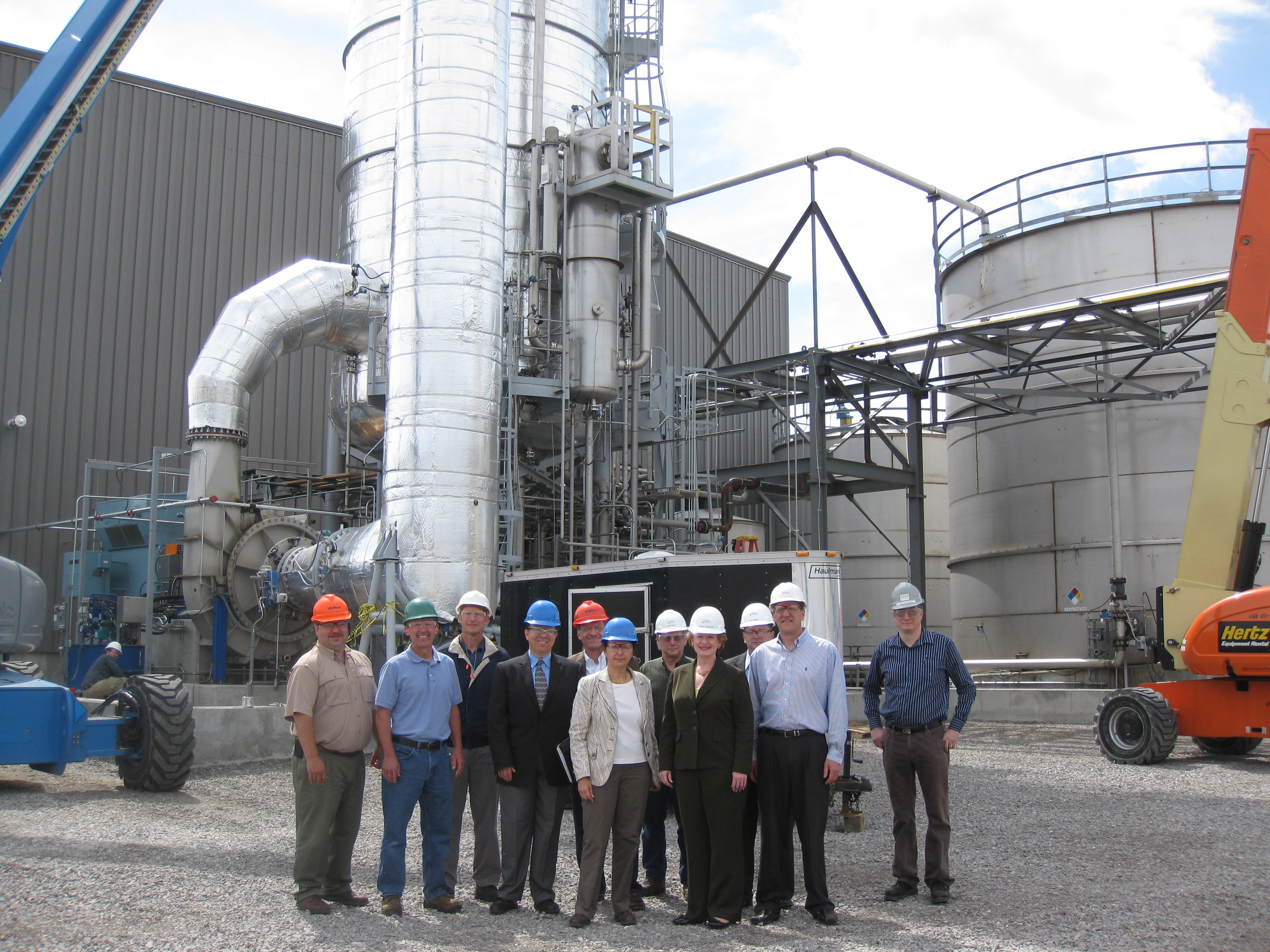
The Alpena biorefinery plant in the USA

A biorefinery is a refinery that converts biomass to energy and other beneficial byproducts (such as chemicals). The International Energy Agency Bioenergy Task 42 defined biorefining as "the sustainable processing of biomass into a spectrum of bio-based products (food, feed, chemicals, materials) and bioenergy (biofuels, power and/or heat)". As refineries, biorefineries can provide multiple chemicals by fractioning an initial raw material (biomass) into multiple intermediates (carbohydrates, proteins, triglycerides) that can be further converted into value-added products. Each refining phase is also referred to as a "cascading phase". The use of biomass as feedstock can provide a benefit by reducing the impacts on the environment, as lower pollutants emissions and reduction in the emissions of hazard products. In addition, biorefineries are intended to achieve the following goals:

1. Supply the current fuels and chemical building blocks
2. Supply new building blocks for the production of novel materials with disruptive characteristics
3. Creation of new jobs, including rural areas
4. Valorization of waste (agricultural, urban, and industrial waste)
5. Achieve the ultimate goal of reducing GHG emissions

== Classification of biorefinery systems ==
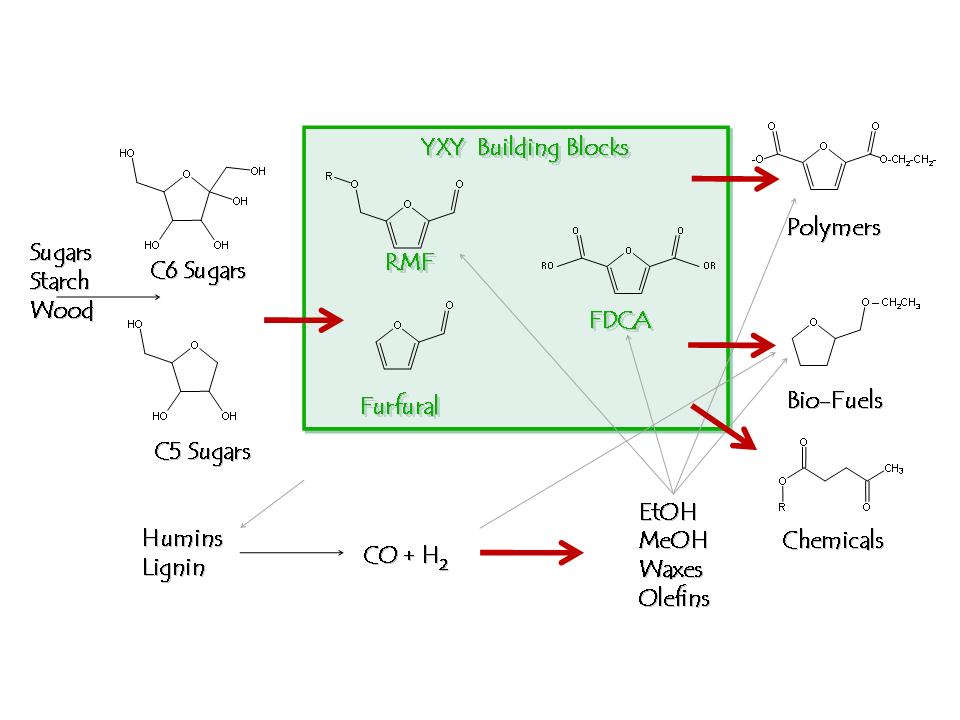
Chemical diagram of the activity of a biorefinery

Biorefineries can be classified based in four main features:

1. Platforms: Refers to key intermediates between raw material and final products. The most important intermediates are:
  - Biogas from anaerobic digestion
  - Syngas from gasification
  - Hydrogen from water-gas shift reaction, steam reforming, water electrolysis and fermentation
  - C6 sugars from hydrolysis of sucrose, starch, cellulose and hemicellulose
  - C5 sugars (e.g., xylose, arabinose: C_{5}H_{10}O_{5}), from hydrolysis of hemicellulose and food and feed side streams
  - Lignin from the processing of lignocellulosic biomass.
  - Liquid from pyrolysis (pyrolysis oil)
2. Products: Biorefineries can be grouped in two main categories according to the conversion of biomass in an energetic or non-energetic product. In this classification the main market must be identified:
  - Energy-driven biorefinery systems: The main product is a second energy carrier as biofuels, power and heat.
  - Material-driven biorefinery systems: The main product is a biobased product
3. Feedstock: Dedicated feedstocks (Sugar crops, starch crops, lignocellulosic crops, oil-based crops, grasses, marine biomass); and residues (oil-based residues, lignocellulosic residues, organic residues and others)
4. Processes: Conversion process to transform biomass into a final product:
  - Mechanical/physical: The chemical structure of the biomass components is preserved. This operation includes pressing, milling, separation, distillation, among others
  - Biochemical: Processes under low temperature and pressure, using microorganism or enzymes.
  - Chemical processes: The substrate suffer change by the action of an external chemical (e.g., hydrolysis, transesterification, hydrogenation, oxidation, pulping)
  - Thermochemical: Severe conditions are apply to the feedstock (high pressure and high temperature, with or without catalyst).

The aforementioned features are used to classified biorefineries systems according to the following method:

1. Identify the feedstock, the main technologies included in the process, platform, and the final products
2. Draw the scheme of the refinery using the features identified in step 1.
3. Label the refinery system according by citing the number of platforms, products, feedstock, and processes involved
4. Elaborate a table with the features identified, and the source of internal energy demand

Some examples of classifications are:

- C6 sugar platform biorefinery for bioethanol and animal feed from starch crops.
- Syngas platform biorefinery for FT-diesel and phenols from straw
- C6 and C5 sugar and syngas platform biorefinery for bioethanol, FT-diesel and furfural from saw mill residues.

== Economic viability of biorefinery systems ==
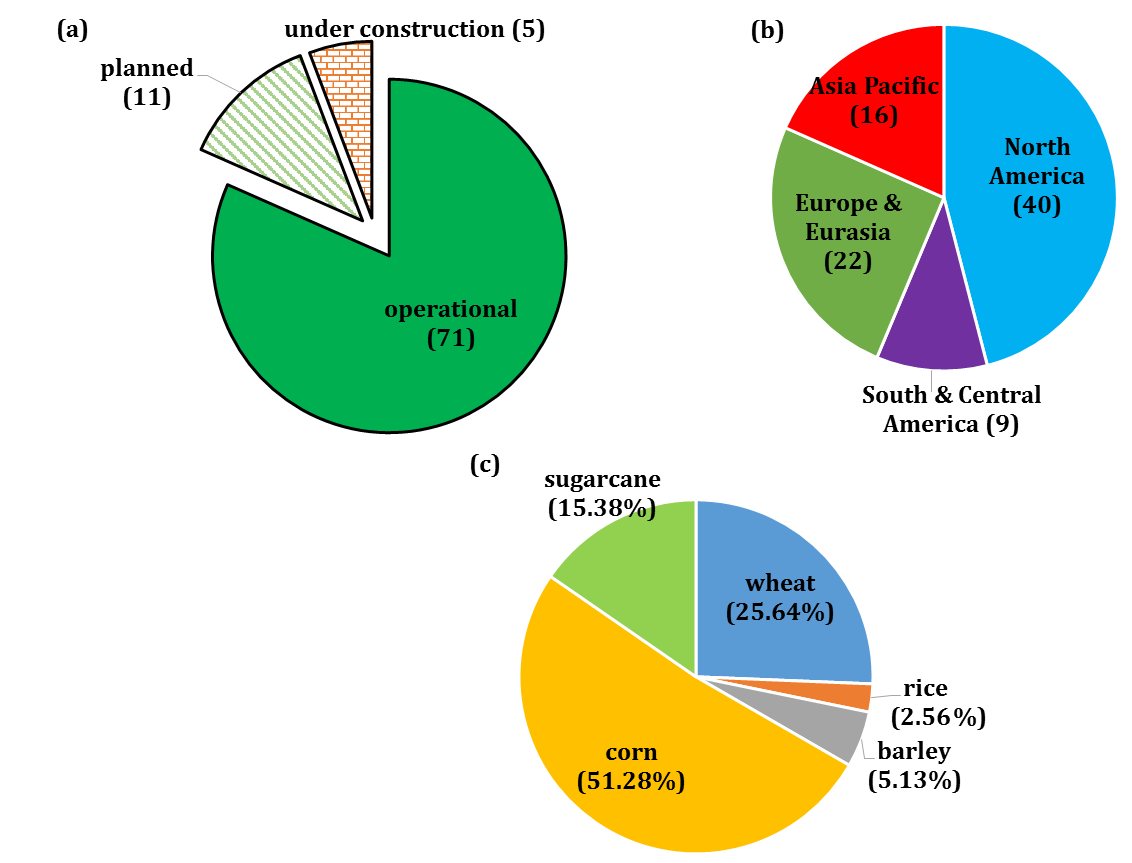
(a) Counts of operational, planned and under-construction cellulosic biorefineries with biochemical conversion technology, (b) global distribution of plants and (c) shares of corn, wheat, rice, barley and sugarcane residues as feedstock as of 2015

Techno-economic assessment (TEA) is a methodology to evaluate whether a technology or process is economically attractive. TEA research has been developed to provide information about the performance of the biorefinery concept in diverse production systems as sugarcane mills, biodiesel production, pulp and paper mills, and the treatment of industrial and municipal solid waste.

Bioethanol plants and sugarcane mills are well-established processes where the biorefinery concept can be implemented since sugarcane bagasse is a feasible feedstock to produce fuels and chemicals; lignocellulosic bioethanol (2G) is produced in Brazil in two plants with capacities of 40 and 84 Ml/y (about 0.4% of the production capacity in Brazil). TEA of ethanol production using mild liquefaction of bagasse plus simultaneous saccharification and co-fermentation shows a minimum selling price between 50.38 and 62.72 US cents/L which is comparable with the market price. The production of xylitol, citric acid and glutamic acid from sugarcane lignocellulose (bagasse and harvesting residues), each in combination with electricity have been evaluated; the three biorefinery systems were simulated to be annexed to an existing sugar mill in South Africa. The production of xylitol and glutamic acid has shown economic feasibility with an internal rate of return (IRR) of 12.3% and 31.5%, exceeding the IRR of the base case (10.3%). Likewise, the production of ethanol, lactic acid or methanol and ethanol-lactic acid from sugarcane bagasse have been studied; lactic acid demonstrated to be economically attractive by showing the greatest net present value (M$476–1278); in the same way; the production of ethanol and lactic acid as co-product was found to be a favorable scenario (net present value between M$165 and M$718) since this acid has applications in the pharmaceutical, cosmetic, chemical and food industry.

As for biodiesel production, this industry also has the potential to integrate biorefinery systems to convert residual biomasses and wastes into biofuel, heat, electricity and bio-based green products. Glycerol is the main co-product in biodiesel production and can be transformed into valuable products through chemocatalytic technologies; the valorization of glycerol for the production of lactic acid, acrylic acid, allyl alcohol, propanediols, and glycerol carbonate has been evaluated; all glycerol valorization routes shown to be profitable, being the most attractive the manufacture of glycerol carbonate. Palm empty fruit bunches (EFB) are an abundant lignocellulosic residues from the palm oil/biodiesel industry, the conversion of this residue into ethanol, heat and power, and cattle feed were evaluated according to techno-economic principles, the scenarios under study shown reduced economic benefits, although their implementation represented a reduction in the environmental impact (climate change and fossil fuel depletion) compared to the traditional biodiesel production. The economic feasibility for bio-oil production from EFB via fast pyrolysis using the fluidized-bed was studied, crude bio-oil can potentially be produced from EFB at a product value of 0.47 $/kg with a payback period and return on investment of 3.2 years and 21.9%, respectively. The integration of microalgae and Jatropha as a viable route for the production of biofuels and biochemicals has been analyzed in the United Arab Emirates (UAE) context. Three scenarios were examined; in all of them, biodiesel and glycerol is produced; in the first scenario biogas and organic fertilizer is produced by anaerobic fermentation of Jatropha fruit cake and seedcake; the second scenario includes the production of lipids from Jatropha and microalgae to produce biodiesel and the production of animal feed, biogas and organic fertilizer; the third scenario involves the production of lipids from microalgae for the production of biodiesel as well as hydrogen and animal feed as final product; only the first scenario was profitable.

In regard to the pulp and paper industry; lignin is a natural polymer co-generated and is generally used as boiler fuel to generate heat or steam to cover the energy demand in the process. Since lignin accounts for 10–30 wt% of the available lignocellulosic biomass and is equivalent to ~40% of its energy contents; the economics of biorefineries depend on the cost-effective processes to transform lignin into value-added fuels and chemicals. The conversion of an existing Swedish kraft pulp mill to the production of dissolving pulp, electricity, lignin, and hemicellulose has been studied; self-sufficiency in terms of steam and the production of excess steam was a key factor for the integration of a lignin separation plant; in this case; the digester has to be upgraded for preserving the same production level and represents 70% of the total investment cost of conversion. The potential of using the kraft process for producing bioethanol from softwoods in a repurposed or co-located kraft mill has been studied, a sugar recovery higher than 60% enables the process to be competitive for the production of ethanol from softwood. The repurposing of a kraft pulp mill to produce both ethanol and dimethyl ether has been investigated; in the process, cellulose is separated by and an alkaline pretreatment and then is hydrolyzed and fermented to produce ethanol, while the resulting liquor containing dissolved lignin is gasified and refined to dimethyl ether; the process demonstrate to be self-sufficient in terms of hot utility (fresh steam) demand but with a deficit of electricity; the process can be feasible, economically speaking, but is highly dependent on the development of biofuel prices. The exergetic and economic evaluation for the production of catechol from lignin was performed to determine its feasibility; the results showed that the total capital investment was 4.9 M$ based on the plant capacity of 2,544 kg/d of feedstock; besides, the catechol price was estimated to be 1,100 $/t and the valorization ratio was found to be 3.02.

The high generation of waste biomass is an attractive source for conversion to valuable products, several biorefinery routes has been proposed to upgrade waste streams in valuable products. The production of biogas from banana peel (Musa x paradisiaca) under the biorefinery concept is a promissory alternative since is possible to obtain biogas and other co-products including ethanol, xylitol, syngas, and electricity; this process also provides high profitability for high production scales. The economic assessment of the integration of organic waste anaerobic digestion with other mixed culture anaerobic fermentation technologies was studied; the highest profit is obtained by dark fermentation of food waste with separation and purification of acetic and butyric acids (47 USD/t of food waste). The technical feasibility, profitability and extent of investment risk to produce sugar syrups from food and beverage waste was analyzed; the returns on investment shown to be satisfactory for the production of fructose syrup (9.4%), HFS42 (22.8%) and glucose-rich syrup (58.9%); the sugar syrups also have high cost competitiveness with relatively low net production costs and minimum selling prices. The valorization of municipal solid waste through integrated mechanical biological chemical treatment (MBCT) systems for the production of levulinic acid has been studied, the revenue from resource recovery and product generation (without the inclusion of gate fees) is more than enough to out- weigh the waste collection fees, annual capital and operating costs.

== Environmental impact of biorefinery systems ==
One of the main goals of biorefineries is to contribute to a more sustainable industry by the conservation of resources and by reducing greenhouse gas emissions and other pollutants. Nevertheless, other environmental impacts may be associated to the production of biobased products; as land use change, eutrophication of water, the pollution of the environment with pesticides, or higher energy and material demand that lead to environmental burdens. Life cycle assessment (LCA) is a methodology to evaluate the environmental load of a process, from the extraction of raw materials to the end use. LCA can be used to investigate the potential benefits of biorefinery systems; multiple LCA studies has been developed to analyse whether biorefineries are more environmentally friendly compared to conventional alternatives.

Feedstock is one of the main sources of environmental impacts in the biofuel production, the source of this impacts are related to the field operation to grow, handle and transport the biomass to the biorefinery gate. Agricultural residues are the feedstock with the lowest environmental impact followed by lignocellulosic crops; and finally by first-generation arable crops, although the environmental impacts are sensitive to factors such as crop management practices, harvesting systems, and crop yields. The production of chemicals from biomass feedstock has shown environmental benefits; bulk chemicals from biomass-derived feedstocks have been studied showing savings on non renewable energy use and greenhouse gas emissions.

The environmental assessment for 1G and 2G ethanol shows that these two biorefinery systems are able to mitigate climate change impacts in comparison to gasoline, but higher climate change benefits are achieved with 2G ethanol production (up to 80% reduction). The conversion of palm empty fruit bunches into valuable products (ethanol, heat and power, and cattle feed) reduces the impact for climate change and fossil fuel depletion compared to the traditional biodiesel production; but the benefits for toxicity and eutrophication are limited. Propionic acid produced by fermentation of glycerol leads to significant reduction of GHG emissions compared to fossil fuel alternatives; however the energy input is double and the contribution to eutrophication is significantly higher The LCA for the integration of butanol from prehydrolysate in a Canadian Kraft dissolving pulp mill shows that the carbon footprint of this butanol may be 5% lower compare to gasoline; but is not as low as corn butanol (23% lower than that of gasoline).

The majority of the LCA studies for the valorization of food waste have been focused on the environmental impacts on biogas or energy production, with only few on the synthesis of high value-added chemicals; hydroxymethylfurfural (HMF) has been listed as one of the top 10 bio-based chemicals by the US Department of Energy; the LCA of eight food waste valorization routes for the production of HMF shows that the most environmentally favorable option uses less polluting catalyst (AlCl_{3}) and co-solvent (acetone), and provides the highest yield of HMF (27.9 Cmol%), metal depletion and toxicity impacts (marine ecotoxicity, freshwater toxicity, and human toxicity) were the categories with the highest values.

== Biorefinery in the pulp and paper industry ==
The pulp and paper industry is considered as the first industrialized biorefinery system; in this industrial process other co-products are produced including tall oil, rosin, vanillin, and lignosulfonates. Apart from these co-products; the system includes energy generation (in for of steam and electricity) to cover its internal energy demand; and it has the potential to feed heat and electricity to the grid.

This industry has consolidated as the highest consumer of biomass; and uses not only wood as feedstock, it is capable of processing agricultural waste as bagasse, rice straw and corn stover. Other important features of this industry are a well-established logistic for biomass production, avoiding competition with food production for fertile land, and presenting higher biomass yields.

== Examples ==
The fully operational Blue Marble Energy company has multiple biorefineries located in Odessa, WA and Missoula, MT.

Canada's first Integrated Biorefinery, developed on anaerobic digestion technology by Himark BioGas is located in Alberta. The biorefinery utilizes Source Separated Organics from the metro Edmonton region, open pen feedlot manure, and food processing waste.

Chemrec's technology for black liquor gasification and production of second-generation biofuels such as biomethanol or BioDME is integrated with a host pulp mill and utilizes a major sulfate or sulfite process waste product as feedstock.

Novamont has converted old petrochemical factories into biorefineries, producing protein, plastics, animal feed, lubricants, herbicides and elastomers from cardoon.

C16 Biosciences produces synthetic palm oil from carbon-containing waste (i.e. food waste, glycerol) by means of yeast.

MacroCascade aims to refine seaweed into food and fodder, and then products for healthcare, cosmetics, and fine chemicals industries. The side streams will be used for the production of fertilizer and biogas. Other seaweed biorefinery projects include MacroAlgaeBiorefinery (MAB4), SeaRefinery and SEAFARM.

FUMI Ingredients produces foaming agents, heat-set gels and emulsifiers from micro-algae with the help of micro-organisms such as brewer's yeast and baker's yeast.

The BIOCON platform is researching the processing of wood into various products. More precisely, their researchers are looking at transforming lignin and cellulose into various products. Lignin for example can be transformed into phenolic components which can be used to make glue, plastics and agricultural products (e.g. crop protection). Cellulose can be transformed into clothes and packaging.

In South Africa, Numbitrax LLC bought a Blume Biorefinery system for producing bioethanol as well as additional high-return offtake products from local and readily available resources such as the prickly pear cactus.

Circular Organics (part of Kempen Insect Valley) grows black soldier fly larvae on waste from the agricultural and food industry (i.e. fruit and vegetable surplus, remaining waste from fruit juice and jam production). These larvae are used to produce protein, grease, and chitin. The grease is usable in the pharmaceutical industry (cosmetics, surfactants for shower gel), replacing other vegetable oils such as palm oil, or it can be used in fodder.

Biteback Insect makes insect cooking oil, insect butter, fatty alcohols, insect frass protein and chitin from superworm (Zophobas morio).

== See also ==
- Microalgae
- Food waste: can be made into PHA (thus a 2nd generation feedstock bioplastic)
- Tomato: can be made into tomato flesh (food), tomato seeds (containing fatty acids) and tomato peel (containing lycopene)
- Biomaterials use in sustainable textile
- Tobacco: GM tobacco could provide industrial enzymes for biofuel production. Tobacco can also supply nicotine (i.e. as used in e-liquids).
- Citrus: can be made into juice (food) and citrus peel (containing succinic acid, pectin, essential oil, cellulose; also just usable as zest)
- Biomass (can be used in CHP systems)
- Gasification
- Carbon neutrality
- Renewable energy commercialization
- Maggot farming
