= Plastic-to-Liquid =

Plastic-to-Liquid (PtL), also referred to as plastic-to-fuel, is a chemical recycling process in which plastic waste is converted into liquid raw materials—typically synthetic oil or synthetic fuel—via pyrolysis. It is utilized for the material or energy recovery of plastics that are difficult to recycle.

== Process ==
The process is based on heat treatment and generally proceeds as follows:

1. The collected plastic waste is sorted, shredded, and cleared of coarse foreign matter.
1. The plastic is heated within a chemical reactor to high temperatures, typically between 350 °C and 500 °C, in the absence of oxygen. Without oxygen, the plastic does not combust; instead, the long chain polymerization structures break down into smaller hydrocarbon molecules.
1. The gases generated in the reactor are cooled and condensed. The primary product is pyrolysis oil, from which mineral oil can be refined.

In contrast to mechanical recycling, such as the conventional shredding and melting of PET bottles, the PtL process can treat heavily contaminated, mixed, or multi-layered plastic waste. The new mineral oil synthesized from the pyrolysis oil matches the high quality of virgin material and is therefore approved for use in applications such as food packaging and medical products.

== Rollout ==
While initial pilot projects in the early 2000s often failed due to technical hurdles, the global momentum toward a circular economy has driven commercial plant construction forward on a massive scale. The first large-scale commercial PtL plant went into operation in 2016 in Almería (Spain), featuring an annual processing capacity of 5,000 tons of plastic waste.

The definitive breakthrough toward industrially viable plants began in the wake of global climate targets, rising CO₂ prices, and bans on plastic waste exports. Since the early 2020s, PtL has emerged as a highly attractive growth market for start-ups, scale-ups, and investors. While established waste management giants typically rely on proven mechanical recycling processes, start-ups leverage their agility to fill technological gaps in the market. Furthermore, they generally do not need to purchase raw materials; instead, municipalities or waste disposal service providers pay them tipping fees to accept hard-to-recycle plastic waste. Because PtL start-ups prevent measurable CO₂ emissions compared to waste incineration, they qualify as ESG investments.

Germany's first industrially operational plant opened in December 2022 at Industriepark Höchst in Frankfurt am Main. Operated by a subsidiary of Sülzle Holding, the facility processes approximately 4,000 tons of mixed plastic waste annually. The largest plastic-to-liquid plant currently under construction in Germany is being built at Chemiepark Gendorf (Bavaria) by the company Pruvia. Scheduled to commission in 2026, it will have an initial annual capacity of 35,000 tons of mixed plastic waste—equivalent to the waste volume generated by more than 900,000 people—with plans to double capacity to 70,000 tons per year by 2028. LyondellBasell (LYB) is also constructing a large-scale thermochemical facility at its Wesseling (North Rhine-Westphalia) site. Also set to launch in 2026, it will process 50,000 tons of plastic waste per year, a scale comparable to the Gendorf project.

At the Schwechat site in Austria, OMV launched a pilot plant in 2018, which has been operating at full capacity since March 2025 with an annual throughput of 16,000 tons. Switzerland currently lacks a large-scale commercial PtL facility, primarily due to insufficient collection volumes and the utilization of modern waste incineration plants for energy recovery. Consequently, Swiss start-ups are relocating industrial operations to neighboring countries, where they establish and operate large-scale recycling sites benefited by more favorable regulatory frameworks and secured feedstock volumes.

Europe's largest PtL plant is located in Porvoo (Finland). Commissioned in March 2026 by Neste, it features a processing capacity of up to 150,000 tons of liquefied plastic waste per year.

While liquefied plastic waste is already being processed at Neste, the world's largest integrated facility for the direct chemical conversion of solid waste in Jieyang (Guangdong Province) represents a major industry breakthrough, setting a global record in the plastic-to-liquid sector. Operational since July 2025, the plant processes 200,000 tons of mixed post-consumer plastics annually. Following the completion of subsequent construction phases (Phases II and III), capacity is projected to scale to over 3 million tons per year. The defining feature of this plant is its core process: unlike conventional methods, it handles unsorted, low-grade municipal and mixed plastic waste without requiring complex pretreatment. A single-stage cracking process splits the polymer chains directly into liquid and gaseous chemical feedstocks. Achieving a product yield exceeding 92 percent, this process is highly cost-effective. The resulting mineral oil is supplied directly to the adjacent petrochemical infrastructure in southern China for further processing.

== Economic efficiency ==
Estimates indicate that less than 5% of globally produced plastic is recycled annually, while production is projected to grow by 3.8% per year until 2030. This expansion compounds the estimated 6.3 billion tons of plastic waste generated over the last 60 years. Researchers estimate that biodegradation will require at least 450 years, if it occurs at all. The plastic-to-liquid pathway offers promising potential not only to mitigate this pervasive environmental pollution but also to generate substantial economic value. In 2018, the American Chemistry Council calculated that PtL facilities could generate approximately 40,000 jobs and nearly 9 billion dollars in value added within the United States alone, illustrating the significant global market potential of the industry.

However, the economic viability of converting plastic waste into liquid fuels or petrochemical feedstocks depends heavily on crude oil prices, sorting costs, and scalability. To date, the process has proven economically viable only for large-scale facilities, as the construction of industrial-scale PtL plants requires capital expenditures of several hundred million euros. Consequently, operations are often financially viable only when fossil crude oil prices are elevated or when regulatory mandates enforce the use of recycled plastics (e.g., through packaging quotas). Virgin, newly extracted crude oil typically remains less expensive than capital-intensive recycled pyrolysis oil.

Feedstock quality is another decisive factor influencing profitability. While homogenous post-industrial waste can be processed cost-effectively, mixed municipal waste requires expensive sorting and purification. High levels of contaminants in the input stream (such as PVC or organic waste) degrade economic efficiency and can damage system components. Reactor operation demands sustained high temperatures. Currently, most pyrolysis plants achieve an oil yield of 60% to 80% relative to the input material. The remaining fractions consist of gases (methane, ethane, etc.), which are frequently combusted for onsite energy consumption, and solid residues (coke, soot, and ash).

Regulatory frameworks also influence viability: whether the process is economically attractive—for instance, through carbon tax exemptions or mandates for recycled fuels—depends heavily on regional legislation. In many nations, mitigating plastic waste accumulation, reducing petroleum dependency, and strengthening energy security serve as primary drivers for plastic-to-liquid technologies.
