= Rodney, Ontario =

Unincorporated community in Ontario, Canada

Rodney
- Unincorporated community
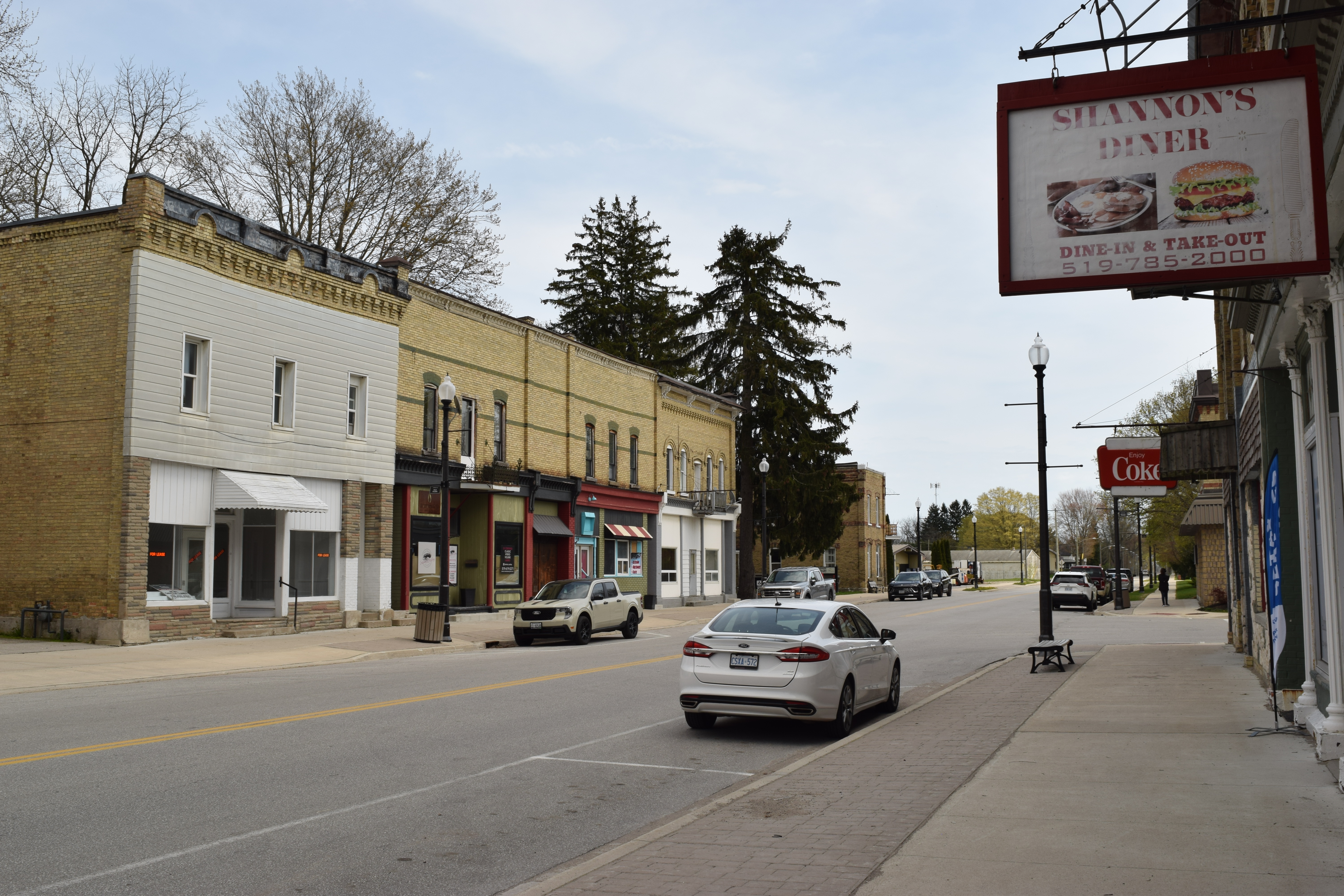
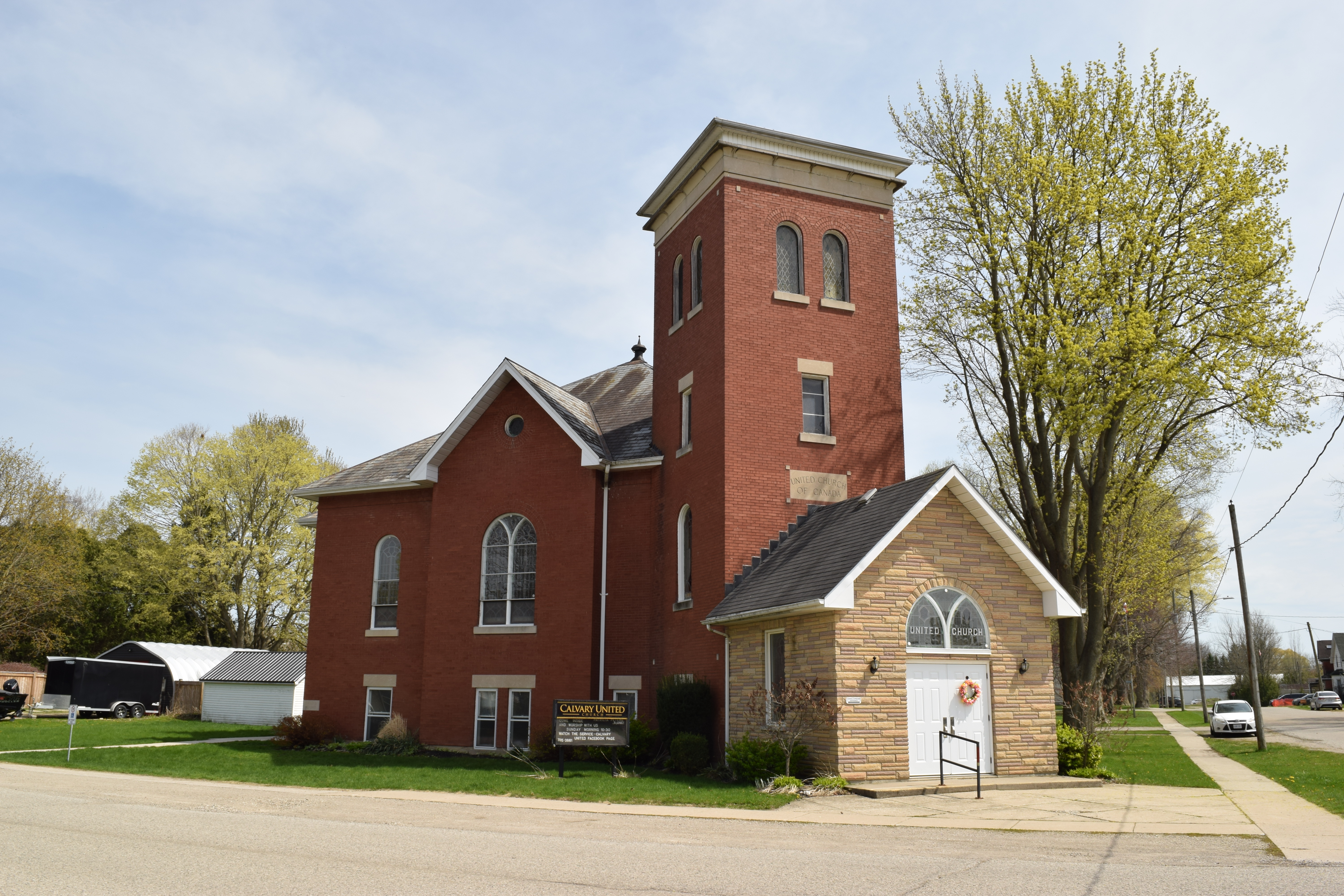
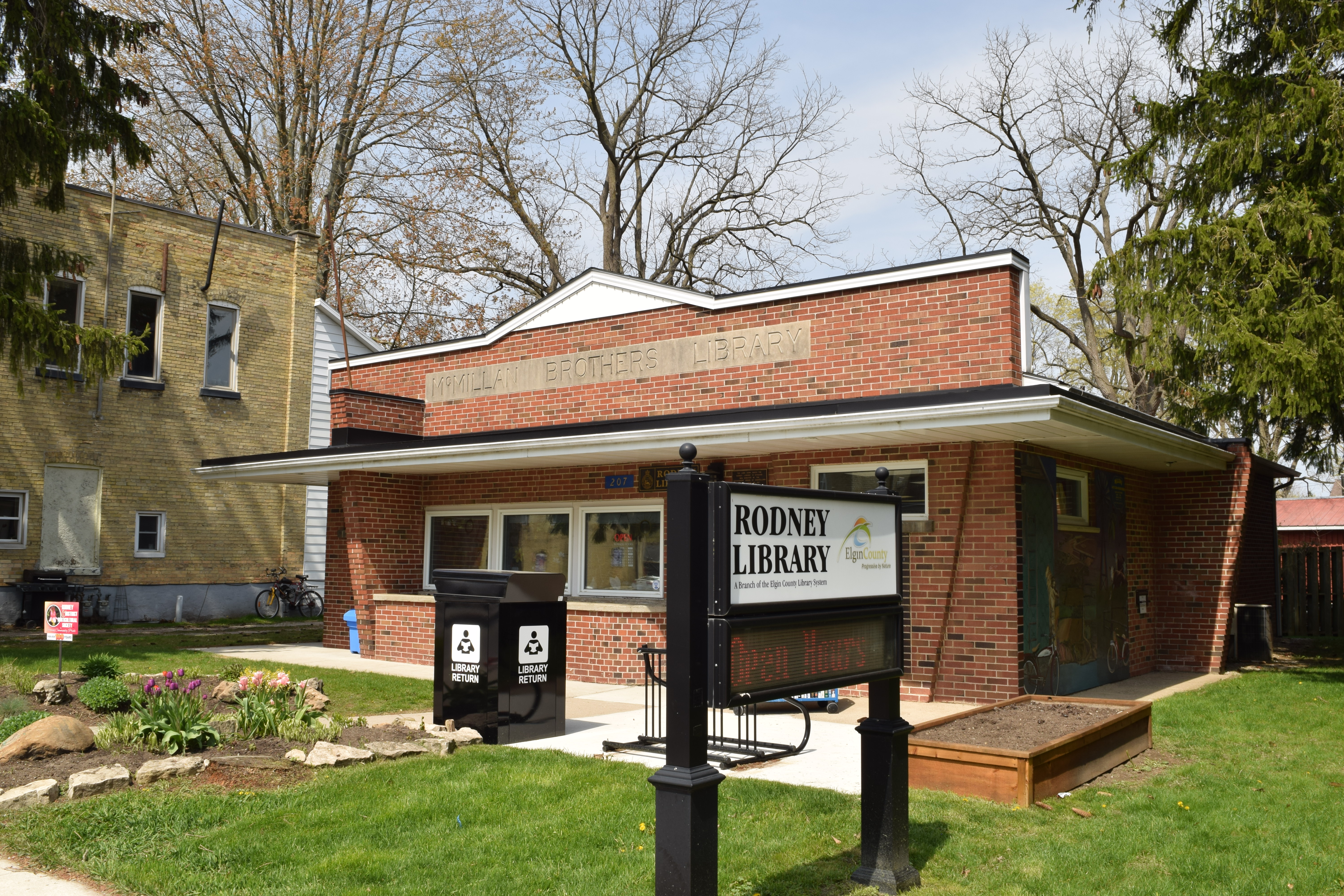
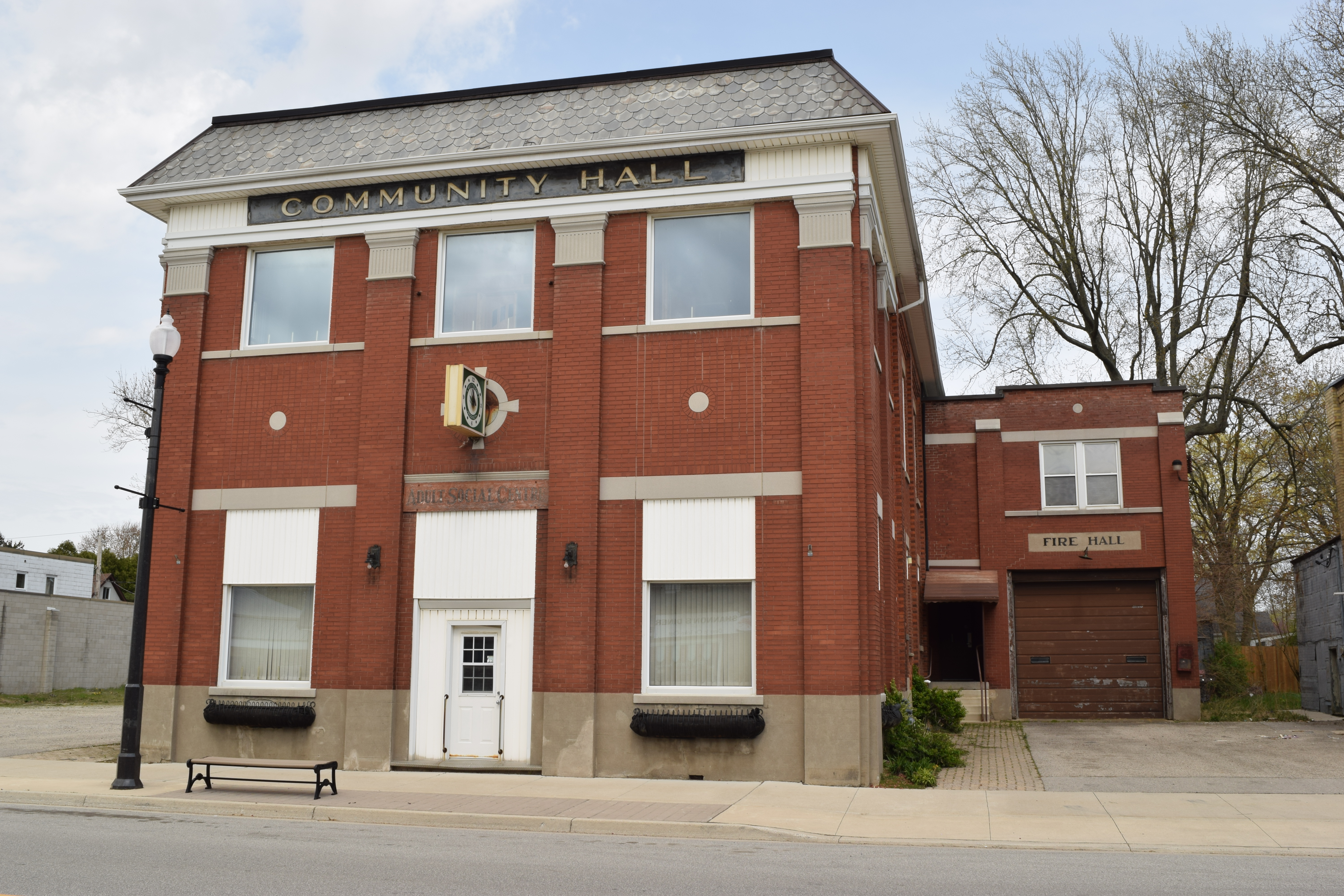
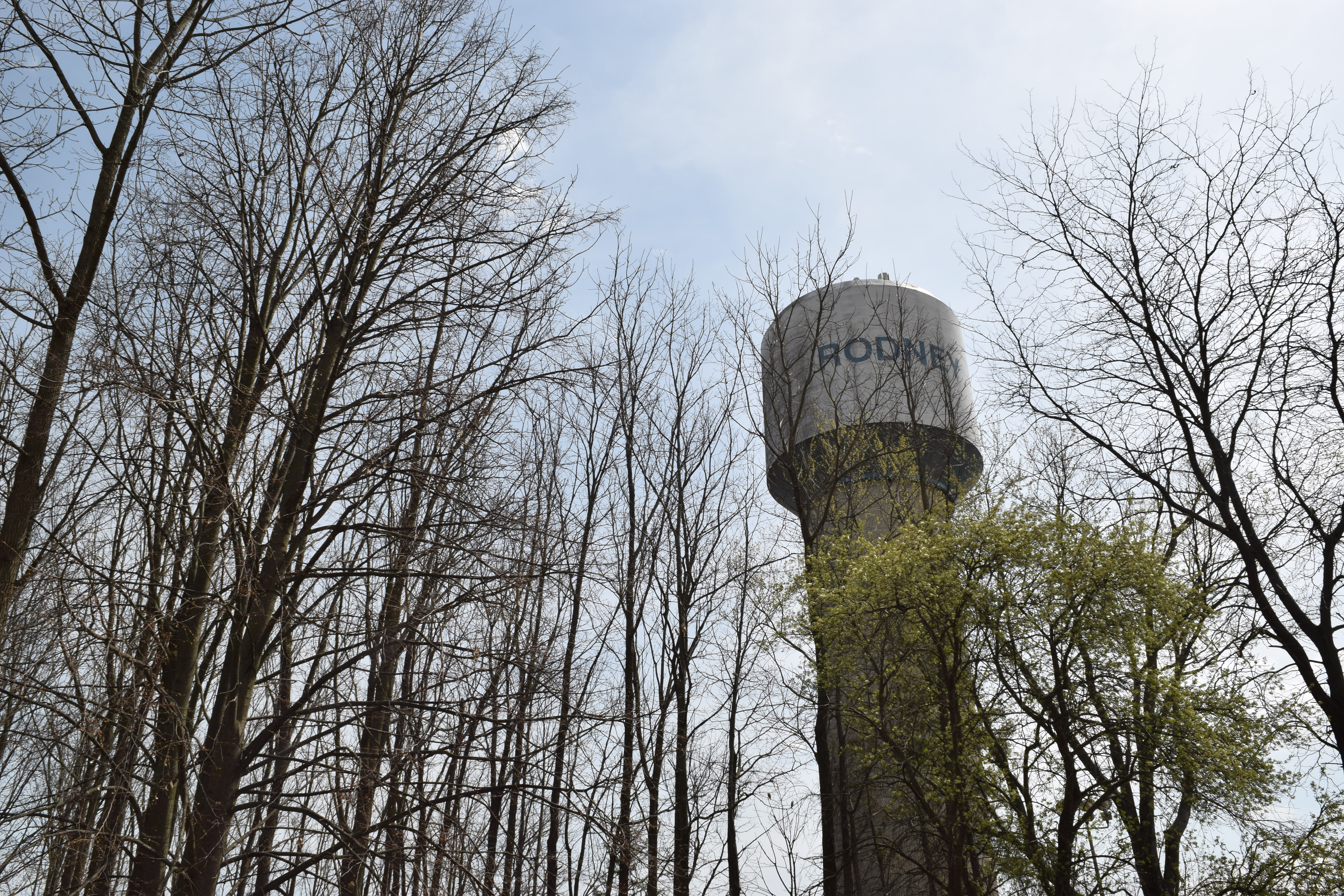
- Furnival Road Streetscape Calvary United Church Rodney Library Old Town Hall Rodney Water Tower

- Location of Rodney in Elgin County Rodney (Southern Ontario)
- Coordinates: 42°34′1.074″N 81°40′54.0768″W
- Country: Canada
- Province: Ontario
- Municipality: West Elgin

Population (2021)
  - Total: 1,004
  - Density: 483.3/km^{2} (1,252/sq mi)
- Time zone: UTC-5 (EST)
  - Summer (DST): UTC-4 (EDT)
- Postal codes: 2C0
- Area code(s): 519, 226, 548, 382

Rodney is an unincorporated community in West Elgin, Ontario, Canada. It is recognized as a designated place by Statistics Canada.

== Demographics ==
In the 2021 Census of Population conducted by Statistics Canada, Rodney had a population of 1,004 living in 432 of its 453 total private dwellings, a change of 0.6% from its 2016 population of 998. With a land area of 2.08 km^{2} (0.80 sq mi), it had a population density of 482.7/km^{2} (1,250.2/sq mi) in 2021.

== See also ==
- List of communities in Ontario
- List of designated places in Ontario
