= Nonfood crop =

Crop grown for manufacturing goods

A nonfood crop, also known as industrial crop, is a crop grown to produce goods for manufacturing, for example fibre for clothing, rather than food for consumption.

== Purpose ==
Industrial crops is a designation given to an enterprise that attempts to raise farm sector income, and provide economic development activities for rural areas. Industrial crops also attempt to provide products that can be used as substitutes for imports from other nations.

== Diversity ==
The range of crops with non-food uses is broad, but includes traditional arable crops like wheat, as well as less conventional crops like hemp and Miscanthus. Products made from non-food crops can be categorised by function:

Function	Products	Crop examples
Biofuels and bioenergy (energy crops)	Bioethanol, biobutanol, biodiesel, syngas and bioenergy	Algae, Buchloe dactyloides, Jatropha, and switchgrass
Building and construction	Hemp-lime building materials, Straw building materials, Insulation, Paints, varnishes	Hemp, wheat, linseed (flax), bamboo
Fiber	Paper, cloth, fabric, padding, string, twine, and rope	Coir, cotton, flax, hemp, manila hemp, papyrus, sisal
Pharmaceuticals (traditional) and therapeutic proteins (novel)	Drugs, botanical and herbal medicines, nutritional supplements, plant-made pharmaceuticals	Borage, Cannabis sativa, Echinacea, Artemisia, Tobacco
Renewable biopolymers	Rubber, Plastics and packaging	Rubber, Wheat, maize, potatoes
Speciality chemicals	Essential oils, printing ink, paper coatings	Lavender, oilseed rape, linseed, hemp

== See also ==
- Biofuel
- Bioplastics
- Biopolymer
- Cash crops
- Cellulosic biofuel
- Energy crop
- Food vs fuel
- Helix of sustainability
- Intensive crop farming
- National Non-Food Crops Centre
- Renewable Energy
