= Himark BioGas =

Canadian waste to energy company

Himark Biogas
- Industry: Anaerobic digestion Waste-to-energy
- Founded: 1976
- Headquarters: Edmonton, Canada
- Area served: Worldwide
- Key people: Evan Chrapko; Bern Kotelko; Shane Chrapko; Mike Kotelko; Trevor Nickel
- Services: Waste-to-energy technology Engineering services
- Website: www.himarkbiogas.com

Himark Biogas Inc. is a waste-to-energy technology and engineering services company. Himark's provides services such as licensing of patented anaerobic digestion technology, conducting feasibility studies, carrying out project design, providing support on engineering and construction, commissioning, and rescue and resuscitation of digesters.

== History ==
The group was founded in 1976 as a mixed grain and purebred cattle farm and has since diversified into various businesses including management of feedlot, licensing of waste-to-energy technology, and management of biogas and ethanol plants.

== Research ==
As of 2014, the company has a research and development expenditure of over $ 35 million and has laboratories in Edmonton and Hairy Hill, Alberta.

== Technology ==
IMUS

The Integrated Manure Utilization System "IMUS" is an anaerobic digestion technology that uses organic waste to produce biogas, which is used to produce electricity and heat. The "IMUS" system produces organic fertilizer and reusable water as bioproducts.

Anaerobic digestion technologies improves the local environment and community health, and helps in disease control, through effective hazardous waste disposal; fertilizer production; disease destruction; pollution prevention; odor elimination; and landfill replacement.

Integrated Bio Refinery

The model integrates the anaerobic digestion technology with other energy consuming system, such as Municipal Facilities, Farm Operations, Open Pen Feedlots, Food Processing, Ethanol Plants, and Green Houses.

== Type of waste ==
The technology can utilize various kinds of feedstock types, including Municipal Organics, Cow Manure, Slaughter House waste, Milk and Cheese Waste, Feed Lot Waste, Sand Laden Waste, Food Processing Waste, Ethanol Co-Products and Human Waste.
