= Wood diesel =

Biofuel extracted from woodchips

Wood diesel is a new biofuel developed by the University of Georgia from woodchips. In the process, oil is extracted and then added to unmodified diesel engines. In the process, either new plants are grown to be used in the process, or a new crop is planted to replace the harvested plants. The charcoal byproduct is put back into the soil as a fertilizer. According to the project's director, Tom Adams, since carbon is put back into the soil, this biofuel can actually be carbon negative not just carbon neutral. Carbon negative decreases carbon dioxide in the air reversing the greenhouse effect not just reducing it.
