= Oil of brick =

Oil of brick, called by apothecaries Oleum de Lateribus and by alchemists Oil of Philosophers, was an empyreumatic oil obtained by subjecting a brick soaked in oil, such as olive oil, to distillation at a high temperature.

== Manufacture ==
The process initially started with pieces of brick, which were heated red hot in live coals, and extinguished in an earth half-saturated with olive oil. Being then separated and pounded grossly, the brick absorbs the oil. It was then put in a retort, and placed in a reverberatory furnace, where the oil was drawn out by fire.

== Uses ==
Oil of brick was used in pre-modern medicine as a treatment for tumors, in the spleen, in palsies, and epilepsies. It was used by lapidaries as a vehicle for the emery by which stones and gems were sawn or cut.
