= Biofuels by region =

Use of biofuel as energy source across the world

Biofuel production by region

The use of biofuels varies by region. The world leaders in biofuel development and use are Brazil, United States, France, Sweden and Germany.

== Americas ==
=== Brazil ===
The government of Brazil hopes to build on the success of the Proálcool ethanol program by expanding the production of biodiesel which must contain 2% biodiesel by 2008, and 5% by 2013.

=== Canada ===
The government of Canada aims for 45% of the country's gasoline consumption to contain 10% ethanol by 2010.

=== Colombia and Venezuela ===
Colombia mandates the use of 10% ethanol in all gasoline sold in cities with populations exceeding 500,000. In Venezuela, the state oil company is supporting the construction of 15 sugar cane distilleries over the next five years, as the government introduces an E10 (10% ethanol) blending mandate.

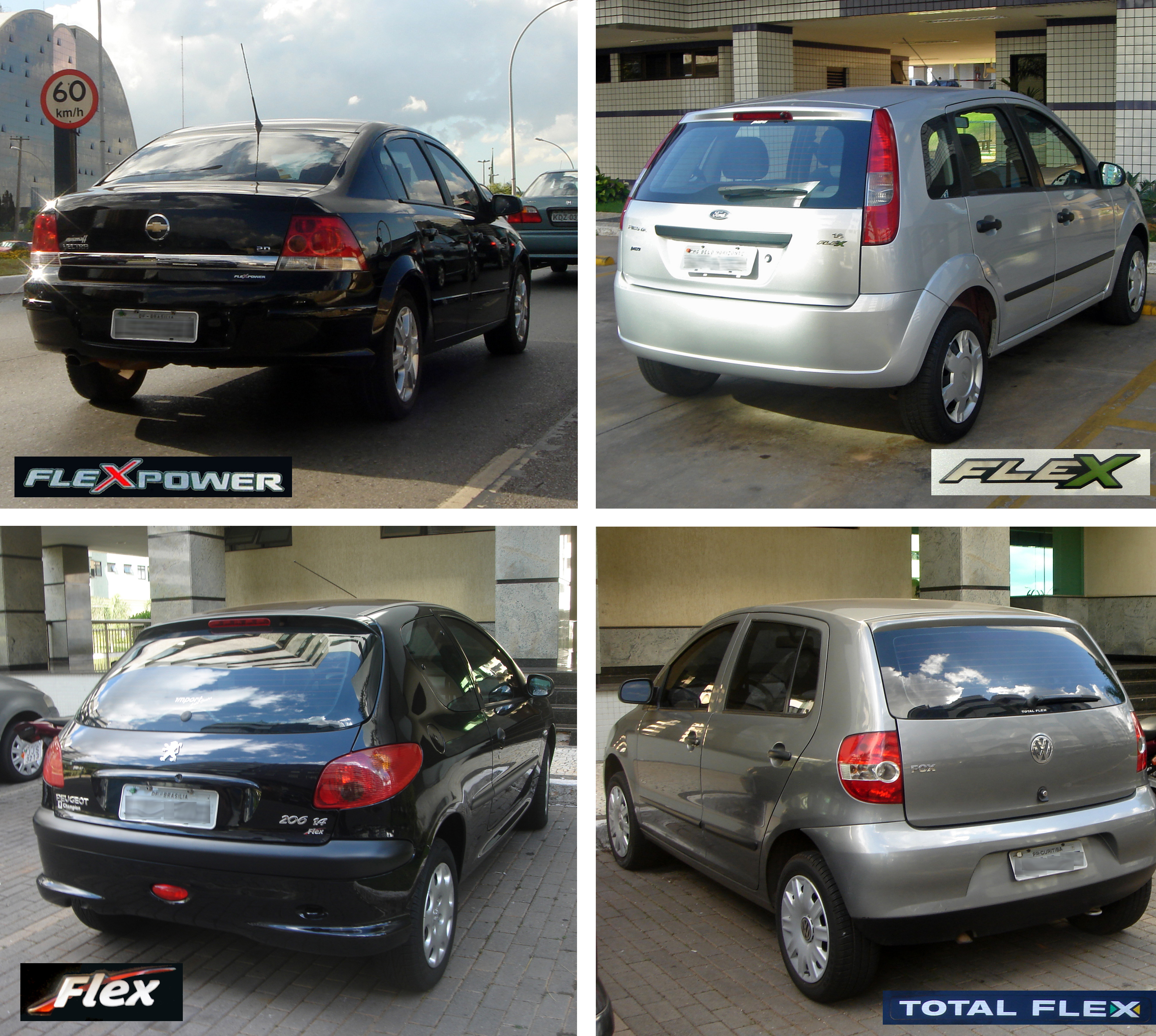
Typical Brazilian "flex" models from several car makers, that run on any blend of ethanol and gasoline.

=== United States ===
The Energy Policy Act of 2005 was passed by the United States Congress on July 29, 2005, and signed into law by President George W. Bush on August 8, 2005, at Sandia National Laboratories in Albuquerque, New Mexico. The Act, described by proponents as an attempt to combat growing energy problems, changed the energy policy of the United States by providing tax incentives and loan guarantees for energy production of various types. In 2006, the United States president George W. Bush said in a State of the Union speech that the US is "addicted to oil" and should replace 75% of imported oil by 2025 by alternative sources of energy including biofuels.

Essentially all ethanol fuel in the US is produced from corn. Corn is a very energy-intensive crop, which requires one unit of fossil-fuel energy to create just 0.9 to 1.3 energy units of ethanol. A senior member of the House Energy and Commerce Committee, Congressman Fred Upton introduced legislation to use at least E10 fuel by 2012 in all cars in the United States.

The 2007-12-19 US Energy Independence and Security Act of 2007 requires American "fuel producers to use at least" 36 billion US gallons (140,000,000 m^{3}) "of biofuel in 2022. This is nearly a fivefold increase over current levels." This is causing a significant shift of resources away from food production. American food exports have decreased (increasing grain prices worldwide), and US food imports have increased significantly.

Today most biofuels are not currently cost-effective without significant subsidies. "America's ethanol program is a product of government subsidies. There are more than 200 different kinds, as well as a 54 cents-a-gallon tariff on imported ethanol. This prices Brazilian ethanol out of an otherwise competitive market. Brazil makes ethanol from sugarcane rather than corn (maize), which has a better EROEI. Federal subsidies alone cost $7 billion a year (equal to around $1.90 a gallon)."

General Motors is starting a project to produce E85 fuel from cellulose ethanol for a projected cost of $1 per US gallon ($0.26 per litre). This is optimistic, because $1 per US gallon equates to $10 per million British thermal units ($34/MWh) which is comparable to woodchips at $7 per million British thermal units ($24/MWh) or firewood at $6 to $12 per million British thermal units ($20 to $41/MWh), and this does not account for conversion losses and plant operating and capital costs which are significant. The raw materials can be as simple as corn stalks and scrap petroleum-based vehicle tires, but used tires are an expensive feedstock with other more-valuable uses. GM has over 4 million E85 cars on the road now, and by 2012 half of the production cars for the US will be capable of running on E85 fuel. But by 2012, the supply of ethanol will not even be close to supplying this much E85. Coskata Inc. is building two new plants for the ethanol fuel. Theoretically, the process is claimed to be five times more energy efficient than corn based ethanol, but it is still in development and has not been proven to be cost effective in a free market. The greenhouse gas emissions are reduced by 86% for cellulose compared to corn's 29% reduction.

The Food, Conservation, and Energy Act of 2008 is a $288 billion, five-year agricultural policy bill being considered by the United States Congress as a continuation of the 2002 Farm Bill. The bill continues the United States' long history of agricultural subsidy as well as pursuing areas such as energy, conservation, nutrition, and rural development.[1] Some specific initiatives in the bill include increases in Food Stamp benefits, increased support for the production of cellulosic ethanol, and money for the research of pests, diseases and other agricultural problems.

== Asia ==
In 2007, the 10 ASEAN members and leaders from Australia, China, India, Japan, South Korea and New Zealand, signed the Cebu Declaration on the East Asian Energy Security Pact in the Philippines and agreed to promote the development of biofuels to reduce fossil fuel dependence and promote cleaner sources of energy. Subsequently, several Asian countries formulated policies and set targets for biofuels utilization. The Philippine government passed a law that mandates a minimum of 1% biodiesel blend within three months and at least 2% biodiesel blend within two years upon the effectiveness of the Act, and at least 5% bioethanol blend within two years upon effectiveness of the Act and 10% bioethanol fuel within four years after (Philippine Republic Act No. 9637 or also known as the Philippine Biofuels Act).” Thailand has established a 10% target for an ethanol mix in regular gasoline, while Malaysia has set a 5% palm oil diesel blend at domestic pumps. Indonesia plans to double the palm oil acreage area over the next 30 years.

=== China ===
China has 45 listed companies doing biofuels-related businesses and is expected to grow even more because of China’s booming economy. Among the major foreign investors are Biolux Energy, Bright BioFuels (BBF), Sunshine Technology Group, and Asia Energy. As of 2008, China ranked No. 8 in Biofuels Country Attractiveness Indices commissioned by Ernst & Young. Since the late 1990s, China has set up major policies supporting the development and utilization of biofuels. In 2001, the government initially formulated the First Five-Year Plan for Bioethanol and the Special Development Plan for Denatured Fuel Ethanol and Bioethanol Gasoline for Automobiles. In early 2002, the National Development and Reform Commission (NDRC) and seven other ministries jointly issued two policy documents: the Pilot Testing Program of Bioethanol for Automobiles, and the Detail Regulations for Implementing the Pilot Testing Program of Bioethanol Gasoline for Automobiles. In 2003, a 10% ethanol (E10) blending for its automobile sector was initiated in three cities in Henan Province and in two cities in Heilongjiang Province. The following major support policies were provided to carry out the terms of the two policy documents: (i) a 5% consumption tax on all bioethanol under the E10 program was waived for all bioethanol plants; (ii) the value-added tax (normally 17%) on bioethanol production was refunded at the end of each year; (iii) all bioethanol plants received subsidized “old grain” (grains reserved in national stocks that are not suitable for human consumption) for feedstock. This subsidy was jointly provided by the central and local governments; and (iv) the government offered a subsidy to ensure a minimum profit for the bioethanol plants. This means that in the event that a bioethanol plant declares loss in production and marketing, the government will provide a subsidy equal to the gap between marketing revenues and production costs plus a reasonable profit that the firm could have obtained from an alternative investment. There are five licensed ethanol fuel producers and over 12 operational biodiesel plants and roughly 28 more under construction in China. Among the licensed ethanol producers, the Jilin Fuel Alcohol Company is the largest, located in an industrial complex in the northern part of China near Jilin City, Jilin Province. The largest ethanol production facility was established in 2001 as a joint venture between PetroChina, Cofoco, and the Jilin Food Company. It has its own power station, water treatment facility, and employs about 430 employees of which 10% are at management level. All ethanol produced at this facility is blended by PetroChina, which has 20 ethanol blending stations in Jilin Province. Bioethanol plants are required by the government to sell their produced fuel ethanol only to appointed oil companies, such as PetroChina or Sinopec at a price of 0.91 or about $0.82/liter. The government subsidizes the gap between the sale price and production cost. China's potential marginal arable lands are limited and most are fragmented. In a 2003-2004 survey conducted by the Ministry of Land and Resources, potential arable lands that are not fragmented amounted only to 7.3 million hectares, accounting for 8.28% of total reserved land.

=== India ===
In 2025, India has achieved its target of 20% ethanol blend fuel and it produced ethanol biofuel worth US$5 billion. In 2021, India imports 85% of petroleum products worth $55 billion, India has set a target of blending 20% ethanol in petrol by 2025 resulting in import substitution and India provides financial assistance for manufacturing ethanol from rice, wheat, barley, corn, sorghum, sugarcane, sugar beet, etc.

The country aims to replace 20% of the country's diesel requirement with biodiesel in accordance with the National Biodiesel Mission (NBM) by 2012. The NBM has been, and will continue to be, implemented in two stages: First is a demonstration project, which was carried out over the period 2003-2007 aimed at cultivating 400,000 hectares of Jatropha expected to yield about 3.75 tons of oilseed per hectare annually. The project has also demonstrated the viability of other related activities/projects such as seed collection and oil extraction. In addition, the government will build a transesterification plant. Second, a commercialisation period which started in 2007 and will proceed until 2012 will continue with Jatropha cultivation. The plan also involves the installation of more transesterification plants that will position India to meet 20% of its diesel needs through biodiesel. High ethanol prices and low availability of sources has compelled the government to amend its 5% blending target with the notification that 5% bioethanol blended petrol shall be supplied in identified areas if (a) the indigenous price of ethanol offered for ethanol blended petrol programme is comparable to that offered by the indigenous ethanol industry for alternative uses, (b) the indigenous delivery price of ethanol offered for the ethanol blended petrol programme at a particular location is comparable to the import parity price of petrol at that location, and (c) there is an adequate supply of ethanol. To encourage investment, there are also tax incentives and excise cuts. At the state level, the Maharashtra government offers waivers of government fee from the 1 percent turnover tax on anhydrous ethanol, ₹ 500 per kilolitre (kl) (US$0.048 per US gallon) permit fee, 4% sales tax, 10% surcharge on sales tax, ₹ 1,500/kl (US$0.14/US gal) import fee, ₹ 300/kl (US$0.029/US gal) service charges and 3% Octroi, which is a local tax collected on various articles brought into the district for consumption. By 2030, it is expected that India will soon become the world's third largest economy due to its speedy growth. In 2005, the GDP of India was US$0.6 trillion, and it is forecasted to reach US$6.1 trillion by the year 2030 at an annual growth rate of 9%.

=== Indonesia ===
On January 25, 2006, the government of Indonesia issued Presidential Instruction (Instruksi Presiden RI) No 1/2006 regarding “Provision and Utilisation of Biofuel as Alternative Fuel” as the legal framework for biofuels development in the country. Accordingly, 10% of bioethanol and biodiesel are allowed to blend with gasoline and diesel. To attract more investors, the government provides investment tax incentives through Government Regulation No. 62/2008, which has the following salient features: (i) 30% reduction of net income from the total investment, applied for 6 yrs, or 5% every year; (ii) expediting depreciation and amortization method; (iii) lower income tax (10%) compared to (15%) in the past for royalties earned by foreign tax payers; and (iv) a longer period of compensation of loss—more than 5 yrs but less than 10 years. To help small farmers, the Ministry of Finance issued Regulation No. 117/PMK.06/2006 or Credit for the Development of Bio-fuel Energy and Plantation Revitalization. This is a subsidized credit scheme for farmers involving several government owned banks—PT. BRI, PT. Bank Mandiri, PT. Bank Bukopin, PT. Bank Sumut, and BPD Sumbar. An interest rate subsidy was also allocated. For example, the market rate for cassava is 18%, while for farmers it is only 9%. Likewise, the market rate for sugar cane where it is 18% but the rate charged to farmers is only 12%. During the initial period, there were only two biodiesel plants in Indonesia: PPKS in Medan and Eterindo in Gresik. At present, there are nine ethanol plants with a total production capacity of 133,632 kiloliters, and some of them began to produce as early as 2007 with oil palm plantation among others like PT Musimas with a capacity of 100,000 tons per year in North Sumatra and PT Prajona Nelayan with a capacity of 60,000 tons per year in Riau. Dumai, also in Riau, was identified by the Indonesian government as the largest biodiesel development center in Indonesia, considering its abundant supply of raw materials including, oil palm in this area, supported by the availability of port facilities and the existence of the largest biofuel processing plant (PT Wilmar Bioenergi with production capacity of 350,000 tons per day). As of 2009, Indonesia has 32 listed companies that are involved in the biofuels industry utilizing sugarcane, cassava, and coconut (according to a presentation delivered by the Directorate General of Electricity and Energy Utilization of the Ministry of Energy and Mineral Resources, Republic of Indonesia in the 2nd Asia Biomass Energy workshop, Biofuels Database in East Asia held last December 8–10, 2009 in Kyoto, Japan). Of these 32 companies, nine of them are ethanol producers with a total production capacity of 133,632 kiloliters. Of nine of these companies, only two of them produce ethanol with specifications for fuel or bioethanol. These companies are PT Bukitmanikam Subur Persada in Lampung and PT Indo Acidama Chemical in Surabaya. Total production capacity of these companies reached 93,282 kiloliter per year. Due to Indonesia's initiatives to increase the cultivation of natural resources in terms of biofuel production in coordination with ethanol producers, the country was able to rank No. 14 in the Ernst and Young's Biofuels Indices in 2008.

=== Israel ===
IC Green Energy, a subsidiary of Israel Corp., aims by 2012 to process 4-5% of the global biofuel market (~4 million tons). It is focused solely on non-edible feedstock such as jatropha, castor, cellulosic biomass and algae. In June 2008, Tel Aviv-based Seambiotic and Seattle-based Inventure Chemical announced a joint venture to use CO_{2} emissions-fed algae to make ethanol and biodiesel at a biofuel plant in Israel.

=== Malaysia ===
Beginning in 1982, Malaysia developed a comprehensive biofuels programme where palm methyl esthers and a 5% blend of processed palm oil were the primary additives to 95% petroleum diesel as transport fuels. At present, Malaysia Energy Centre forecasted that for the next 25 years the country's energy requirements would be tripled from its present consumption levels and expand at a 5.2% annual rate. According to Malaysia's national oil company Petronas, the country's reserves of 5.2 billion barrels of crude oil may only last for another 20 years at the present rate of extraction unless new oil fields are explored or new sources of energy emerge. In pursuit of energy security through diversification, Malaysia passed the Five Fuel Diversification Strategy. Under this strategy, the Malaysian government enacted the National Biofuel Policy (NBP) in August 2005 to develop a framework for biofuels. The NBP aims to supplement the diminishing supply of fossil fuels with renewable resources and has mobilized local resources for biofuel production. This effort involves the exploitation of local technology to generate energy for the transportation and industrial sectors and to pave the way for the export of biofuels. The NBP operates through five strategic objectives:

- Objective 1: Biofuel for Transport. Diesel for land and sea transport will be a blend of 5% processed palm oil and 95% petroleum diesel. This ‘B5’ would be made available throughout the country.
- Objective 2: Biofuel for Industry. Supply B5 diesel to the industrial sector, to be used as fuel in industrial boilers, construction machinery, and diesel-powered generators.
- Objective 3: Biofuel Technologies. Promote research, development, and commercialization of biofuel technologies.
- Objective 4: Biofuel for Export. Encourage and facilitate the establishment of plants for producing biofuels for export.
- Objective 5: Biofuel for a Cleaner Environment. Enhance the quality of the ambient air, reduce the use of fossil fuels, and minimize emissions of greenhouse gases (mainly carbon dioxide), carbon monoxide, sulphur dioxide and particulates through the increased use of biofuels.

In August 2006, Malaysia's pioneer commercial biodiesel plant started its initial operations. A total of 55,000 tons of biodiesel were produced between August and December 2006, and in 2007 production, escalated to 130,000 tons. RBD palm oil was the primary feedstock used, which accounted for 94% of the total processed palm oil for biodiesel. To regulate the biofuel industry and promote its further development, the Lower House of the Parliament passed the Biofuel Industries Act in April 2007. This statute provides for the mandatory use of biofuels and the licensing of biofuel-related activities; it also allows the licensing authority to revoke or suspend any license if the licensee has ceased to produce, operate or carry out any activity for which the license was issued. The Malaysian government also approved in the same year a total of 92 biodiesel projects, 57 which were installed in Peninsular Malaysia and 35 located in East Malaysia, with a combined annual production capacity of 10.4 million tons or 11.7 billion liters. But at that time, there were only five plants in operation with combined production capacities of 400,000 tons per year. Therefore, an additional seven plants with production capacities of 615,000 tons were constructed during that year. As of September 2008, there were 14 functional biodiesel plants, but only eight were in operation while the other four had suspended operations due to incessant price increases of biodiesel feedstock. From January to September 2008, the estimated total production capacity was 130,000 tons of biodiesel.

=== Philippines ===
In 2004, demand for imported fossil fuel products in the Philippines reached approximately 106.5 million barrels of fuel oil, equivalent (MBFOE) to roughly 39% of the total primary energy supply mix. This volume was 96% of the total petroleum supply, reflecting the country's tremendous dependence on imported fossil fuel. The Philippines’ total indigenous local energy production (including coal, oil, natural gas, geothermal, hydropower, biomass, solar and wind) was 139.72 MMBFOE, which in 2004 translated to energy self-sufficiency level of 51%. In terms of foreign exchange, the importations volume has reach an equivalent to roughly US$3.8 billion of currency outflow on an annual basis, the transportation sector representing the largest consumer. Accordingly, they utilized at least 56 MBFOE, equivalent to 28.7% of the country's total consumption. In response to this foreseen dilemma, the Philippine government formulated a national policy that would reduce the country's dependence on imported fossil fuel, protect public health, the environment, and the country's natural ecosystem. This initiative would also generate opportunities for the livelihoods of people, particularly in the countryside. On January 12, 2007, Republic Act No. 9367, or the Biofuels Act, was enacted to develop and utilize indigenous, renewable, and sustainable clean energy sources. The statute mandates the use of bioethanol, biodiesel, and other fuels made from biomass as alternative forms of energy. Two of the salient features of the law include a 5% minimum ethanol blend to gasoline within two years of the Biofuels Act and a 10% minimum blend two years thereafter. Based on the Philippine Energy Plan (2007–2014), a 5% minimum blend was required amounting to 208.11 million liters of ethanol by 2009. With a 10% blend, 460.63 million liters (inclusive of consumption growth rate) will be needed by 2011.

On December 16, 2008, the Renewable Energy Act of 2008 was signed into law to accelerate the exploration, development, and utilization of renewable energy resources, including biofuels and to provide a legal and institutional framework to harmonize the fragmented policies for renewable energy in the country. One salient feature of the policy is to create an environment conducive to investments through the provision of the following incentives: (a) duty-free importation of renewable energy (RE) machinery, equipment and materials over the initial 10 years through the issuance of certifications to RE developers; (b) duty-free importation of farm machinery and agricultural inputs during the initial 10 years from the effectivity of the Renewable Energy law; (c) income tax holidays over the first seven years of commercial operation; (d) accelerated depreciation if an RE fails to receive an ITH before full operation; (e) cash incentives from RE Developers for Missionary Electrification, i.e., 50% of the universal charge for power needed to service missionary areas; (f) corporate tax rates of 10% on its net taxable income after the initial seven-year ITH period; (g) tax exemptions for carbon credits; (h) special realty tax rates of not more than 1.5% on equipment and machinery, civil works, and other improvements; and (i) net operating loss carry-over (NOLCO) during the first three years of commercial operation will be deductible from gross income over the next seven years of operation. As of 2009, the Department of Energy has accredited 12 producers of Coconut Methyl Ester (CME) for biodiesel with a total production capacity of 395,620,165 liters. The Sugar Regulatory Administration (SRA) has accredited two producers of bioethanol (from sugarcane) with a total production capacity of 39 million liters per year.

=== Thailand ===
The Thai government instituted the use of gasohol in government vehicles to set an example and to ensure public confidence in biofuels. In 2000, a biomass ethanol project was approved by the Cabinet to encourage investors from the ethanol and biodiesel industries. As a result, 24 investment permits were issued to producers, resulting in a combined production capacity of 4,115,000 liters per day, The following year, three investment permits with a total production capacity of 595,000 liters per day were issued but allegedly, due to uncertainties involving the price of ethanol, construction of the ethanol plants was delayed. To encourage more investors and ensure a sufficient ethanol supply, the government lifted the ceiling on investment permits. Additionally, the Thai government provides zero taxes on imported equipment and machinery and zero income tax for eight years. On September 14, 2006, 18 more permits were granted to ethanol producers enabling the country to reach a total production capacity of 5,730,000 liters per day. The Thai government has a policy of non-intervention for biodiesel production, and interested parties are encouraged to apply for permits to the Department of Industrial Plants, Ministry of Industry. Two sub-committees were appointed by the Energy Policy Committee to oversee ethanol and biodiesel production.

In 2006, the Ministry of Energy (MOE) placed a target on ethanol use as a substitute for methyl tertiary butyl ether mixed with 95 octane gasoline and also to substitute a portion of 91 octane gasoline at the rate of 1.00 million liters per day. However, due to an economic slowdown and price effect of gasoline consumption, the MOE reduced its target to 2.40 million liters per day. The blending target for biodiesel for the whole country is 5% or 3.96 million liters per day of B100. The initial intention was to increase by 10% or 8.50 million liters per day in 2012, but for the same reasons mentioned above, the 2011 target was revised and slashed to 3.02 million liters per day of B100. On November 22, 2007, the MOE and Bank of Agriculture and Agricultural Cooperatives (BAAC) decided to provide low-interest, B7,000 million loans to farmers to grow palm oil for 10 years at a minimum return rate of -0.5% as a support to their livelihood. To formulate a comprehensive framework for oil palm development, the cabinet approved on January 15, 2008, a government order to set up a National Oil Palm Policy. The Department of Alternative Energy Development and Efficiency under the Ministry of Energy reported that Thailand has at least 48 registered number ethanol companies and 14 biodiesel producers as of 2009.

== Europe ==
=== European Union ===
The European Union in its biofuels directive (updated 2006) has set the goal that for 2010 that each member state should achieve at least 5.75% biofuel usage of all used traffic fuel. By 2020 the figure should be 10%. These targets were reduced in 2015 in light of certain environmental and social concerns associated with biofuels such as rising food prices and deforestation.

=== France ===
France is the second largest biofuel consumer among the EU States in 2006. According to the Ministry of Industry, France's consumption increased by 62.7% to reach 682,000 toe (i.e. 1.6% of French fuel consumption). Biodiesel represents the largest share of this (78%, far ahead of bioethanol with 22%). The unquestionable biodiesel leader in Europe is the French company Diester Industrie producing of 2 million tons of biodiesel. In bioethanol, the French agro-industrial group Téréos is increasing its production capacities. Although France is bound by the EU Renewable Energy Directive and Fuel Quality Directive, the country has not yet implemented any legislation promoting the use of renewable energies to date.

=== Germany ===
Germany remained the largest European biofuel consumer in 2006, with a consumption estimate of 2.8 million tons of biodiesel (equivalent to 2,408,000 toe), 0.71 million ton of vegetable oil (628.492 toe) and 0.48 million ton of bioethanol (307,200 toe). The biggest German biodiesel company is ADM Ölmühle Hamburg AG, subsidiary of the American group Archer Daniels Midland Company. Among the other large German producers, MUW (Mitteldeutsche Umesterungswerke GmbH & Co KG) and EOP Biodiesel AG. A major contender in terms of bioethanol production is the German sugar corporation, Südzucker. Germany has enacted legislation to promote the use of biofuels in transport through 2014 in partial compliance with the Renewable Energy Directive and Fuel Quality Directive.

=== Spain ===
The Spanish group Abengoa, via its American subsidiary Abengoa Bioenergy, is the European leader in production of bioethanol. Spain has enacted legislation to promote the use of biofuels in transport through 2013 in partial compliance with the RED and FQD.

=== Sweden ===
Reduction mandate of greenhouse emissions from fossil fuels in Sweden by means of biofuel mixtures*) The reduction was reduced to the EU minimum level (6 percent for petrol and diesel) according to a bill by the Kristersson Cabinet in 2023. **)Further reduction was paused during 2023 based on a bill by the Andersson Cabinet.
Year	Gasoline	Diesel	Jet kerosene
2020	4,2 %	21 %	-
2021	6,0 % (1 Aug)	26 % (1 Aug)	0,8 % (1 July)
2022	7,8 %	30,5 %	1,7 %
2023	~~10,1 %~~; 7,8 %**	~~35 %~~; 30,5 %**	2,6 %
2024	~~12,5 %~~; 6%*	~~40 %~~; 6%*	3,5 %
2025	~~15,5 %~~; 6%*	~~45 %~~; 6%*	4,5 %
2026	~~19 %~~; 6%*	~~50 %~~; 6%*	7,2 %
2027	~~22 %~~*	~~54 %~~*	10,8 %
2028	~~24 %~~*	~~58 %~~*	15,3 %
2029	~~26 %~~*	~~62 %~~*	20,7 %
2030	~~28 %~~*	~~66 %~~*	27,0 %

The government of Sweden and the national association of auto makers, BIL Sweden, have started work to end oil dependency. One-fifth of cars in Stockholm can run on alternative fuels, mostly ethanol fuel. Stockholm is to introduce a fleet of Swedish-made hybrid ethanol-electric buses.

=== United Kingdom ===
In the United Kingdom, the Renewable Transport Fuel Obligation (RTFO) (announced 2005) is the requirement that by 2010 5% of all road vehicle fuel is renewable. In 2008 a critical report by the Royal Society stated that "biofuels risk failing to deliver significant reductions in greenhouse gas emissions from transport and could even be environmentally damaging unless the Government puts the right policies in place".

== Developing countries ==
Biofuel industries are becoming established in many developing countries. Many developing countries have extensive biomass resources that are becoming more valuable as demand for biomass and biofuels increases. The approaches to biofuel development in different parts of the world varies. Countries such as India and China are developing both bioethanol and biodiesel programs. India is extending plantations of jatropha, an oil-producing tree that is used in biodiesel production. The Indian sugar ethanol program sets a target of 5% bioethanol incorporation into transport fuel. China is a major bioethanol producer and aims to incorporate 15% bioethanol into transport fuels by 2010. Costs of biofuel promotion programs can be very high, though.

In rural populations in developing countries, biomass provides the majority of fuel for heat and cooking. Wood, animal dung and crop residues are commonly burned. Figures from the International Energy Agency (IEA) show that biomass energy provides around 30% of the total primary energy supply in developing countries; over 2 billion people depend on biomass fuels as their primary energy source.

The use of biomass fuels for cooking indoors is a source of health problems and pollution. 1.3 million deaths were attributed to the use of biomass fuels with inadequate ventilation by the International Energy Agency in its World Energy Outlook 2006.

Proposed solutions include improved stoves and alternative fuels. However, fuels are easily damaged, and alternative fuels tend to be expensive. Very low cost, fuel efficient, low pollution biomass stove designs have existed since 1980 or earlier. Issues are a lack of education, distribution, corruption, and very low levels of foreign aid. People in developing countries often cannot afford these solutions without assistance or financing such as microloans. Organizations such as Intermediate Technology Development Group work to make improved facilities for biofuel use and better alternatives accessible to those who cannot get them.

== See also ==
- European Biofuels Technology Platform
- List of algal fuel producers
- Biofuel advocacy groups
- List of biofuel companies and researchers
- Biodiesel by region
- List of renewable energy topics by country
