= Agricultural productivity =

Quotient between production and productive factors

The Green Revolution significantly increased food production, enabling it to outpace population growth reducing the risk of food scarcity as population increased in the latter half of the 20th century.

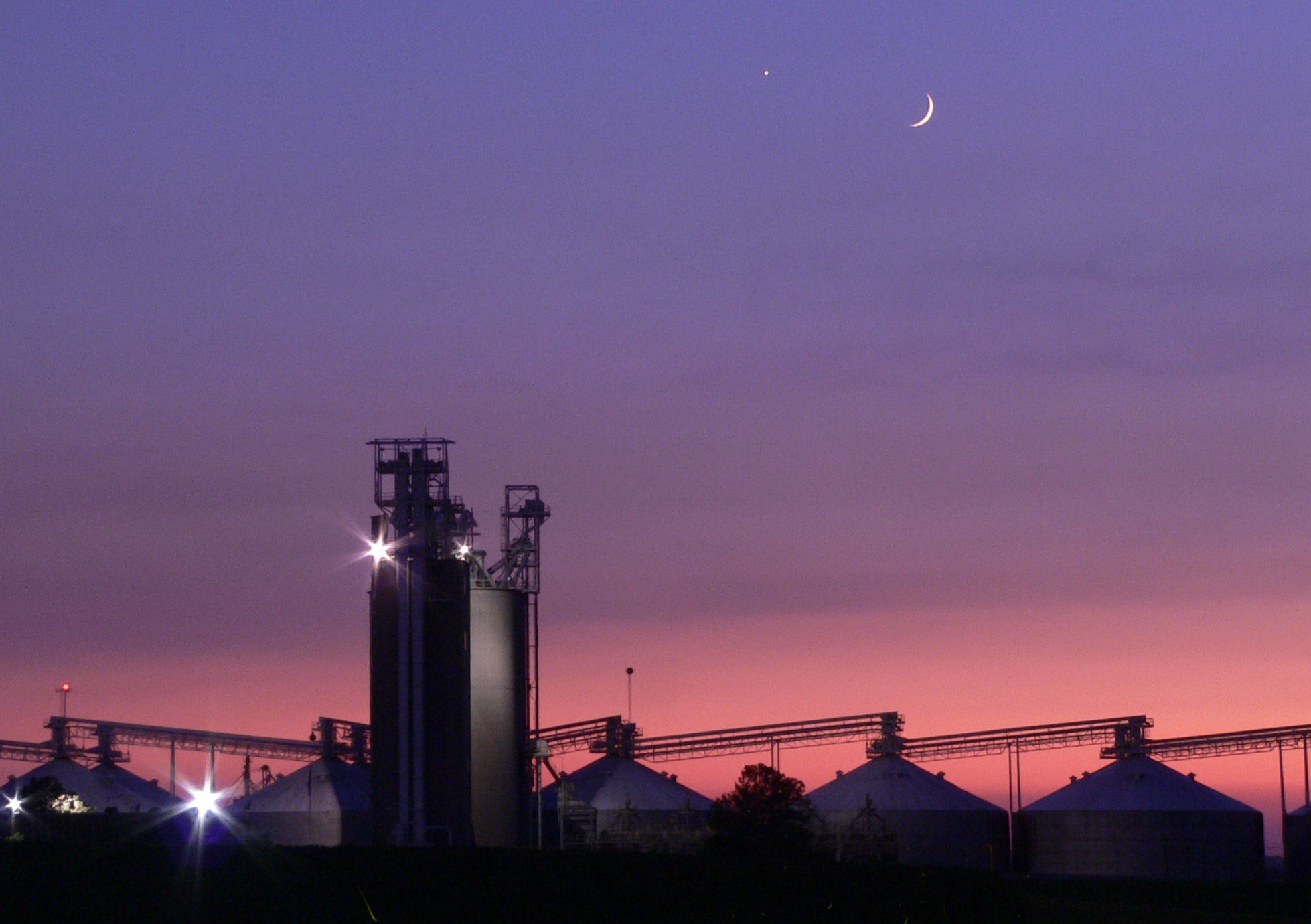
Grain silos -- increases in yields of grain and grain calory production has been the main cause of productivity increases in the 20th century.

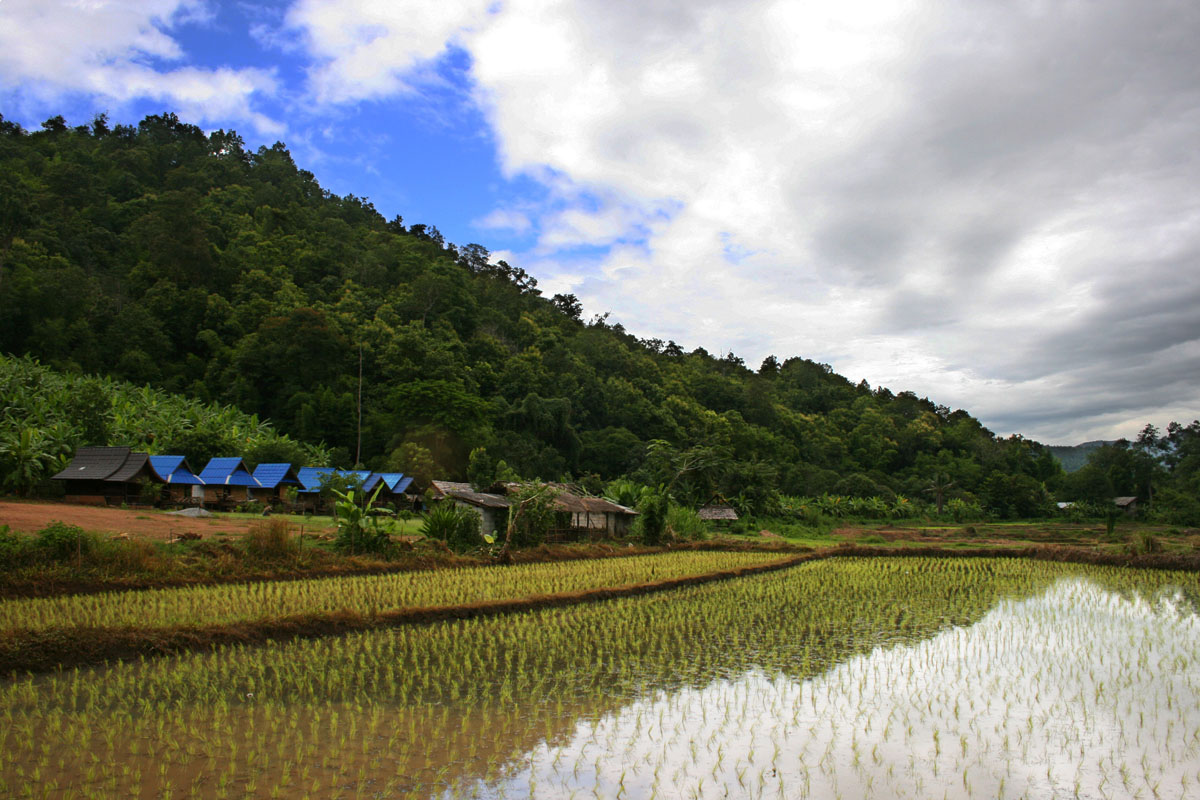
Rice plantation in Thailand

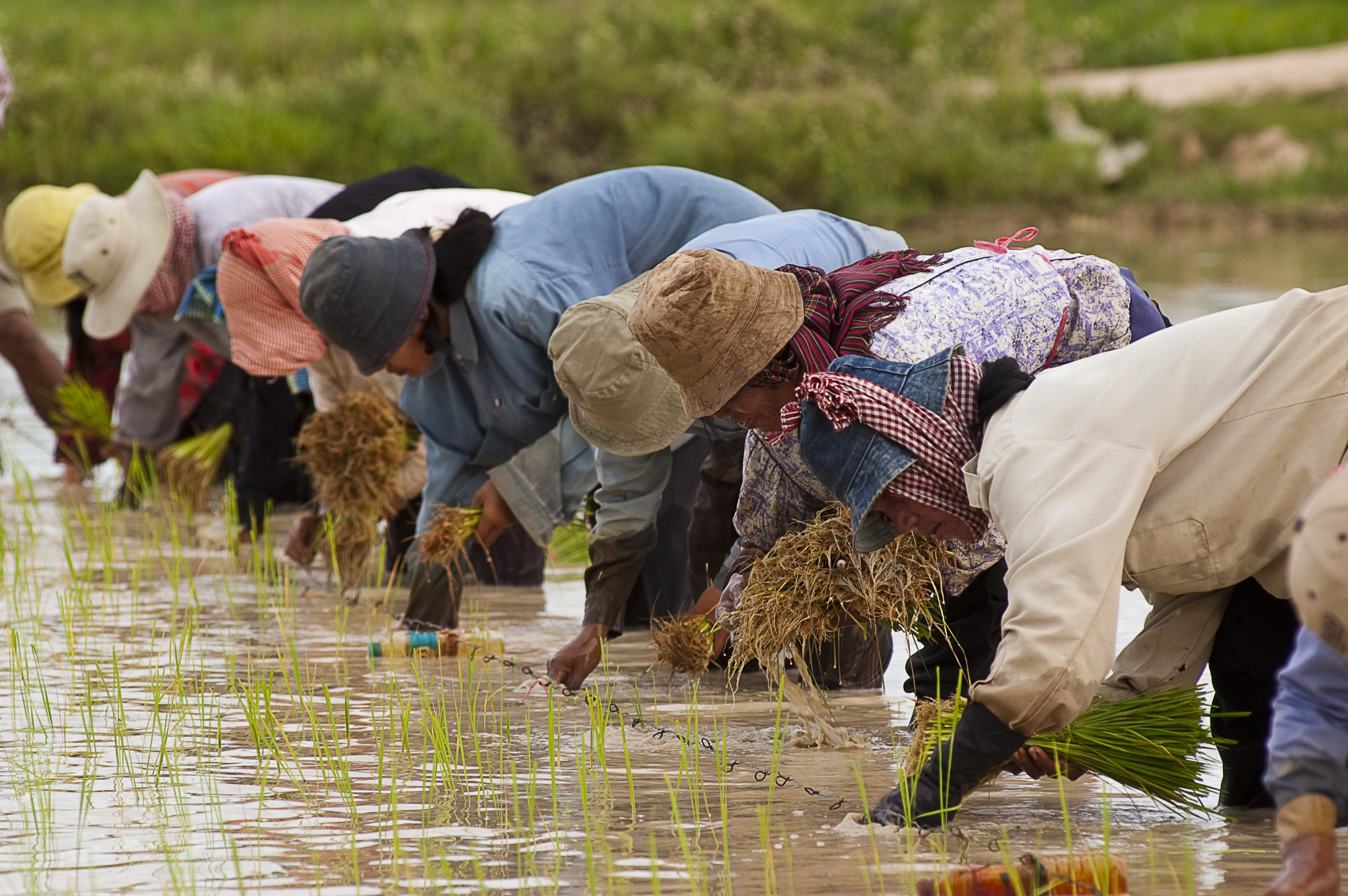
Cambodians planting rice, 2004

Agricultural productivity is measured as the ratio of agricultural outputs to inputs. While individual products are usually measured by weight, which is known as crop yield, varying products make measuring overall agricultural output difficult. Therefore, agricultural productivity is usually measured as the market value of the final output. This productivity can be compared to many different types of inputs such as labour or land. Such comparisons are called partial measures of productivity.

Agricultural productivity may also be measured by what is termed total factor productivity (TFP). This method of calculating agricultural productivity compares an index of agricultural inputs to an index of outputs. This measure of agricultural productivity was established to remedy the shortcomings of the partial measures of productivity; notably that it is often hard to identify the factors cause them to change. Changes in TFP are usually attributed to technological improvements.

For the United States farm sector, Department of Agriculture indexes show that between 1948 and 2023 total agricultural output increased by about 210 percent, while total input use increased by about 9 percent and total factor productivity increased by about 184 percent. The indexes use 2015 as their base year.

Agricultural productivity is an important component of food security. Increasing agricultural productivity through sustainable practices can be an important way to decrease the amount of land needed for farming and slow environmental degradation and climate change through processes like deforestation.

== Sources of agricultural productivity ==
Wheat yields in least developed countries since 1961. The steep rise in crop yields in the U.S. began in the 1940s. The percentage of growth was fastest in the early rapid growth stage. In developing countries maize yields are still rapidly rising.

Productivity is driven by changes in either agricultural technique or improvements in technology. Some sources of changes in agricultural productivity have included:

- Mechanization
- High yield varieties, which were the basis of the Green revolution
- Fertilizers: Primary plant nutrients: nitrogen, phosphorus and potassium and secondary nutrients such as sulfur, zinc, copper, manganese, calcium, magnesium and molybdenum on deficient soil
- Education in management and entrepreneurial techniques to decrease fixed and variable costs and optimise manpower
- Liming of acid soils to raise pH and to provide calcium and magnesium
- Irrigation
- Herbicides
- Genetic engineering
- Pesticides
- Increased plant density
- Animal feed made more digestible by processing
- Keeping animals indoors in cold weather

See: Productivity improving technologies (historical) Section: 2.4.1: Mechanization: Agriculture, Section 2.6: Scientific agriculture.

== Impact ==
The productivity of a region's farms is important for many reasons. Aside from providing more food, increasing the productivity of farms affects the region's prospects for growth and competitiveness on the agricultural market, income distribution and savings, and labour migration. An increase in a region's agricultural productivity implies a more efficient distribution of scarce resources. As farmers adopt new techniques and differences, the more productive farmers benefit from an increase in their welfare while farmers who are not productive enough will exit the market to seek success elsewhere.

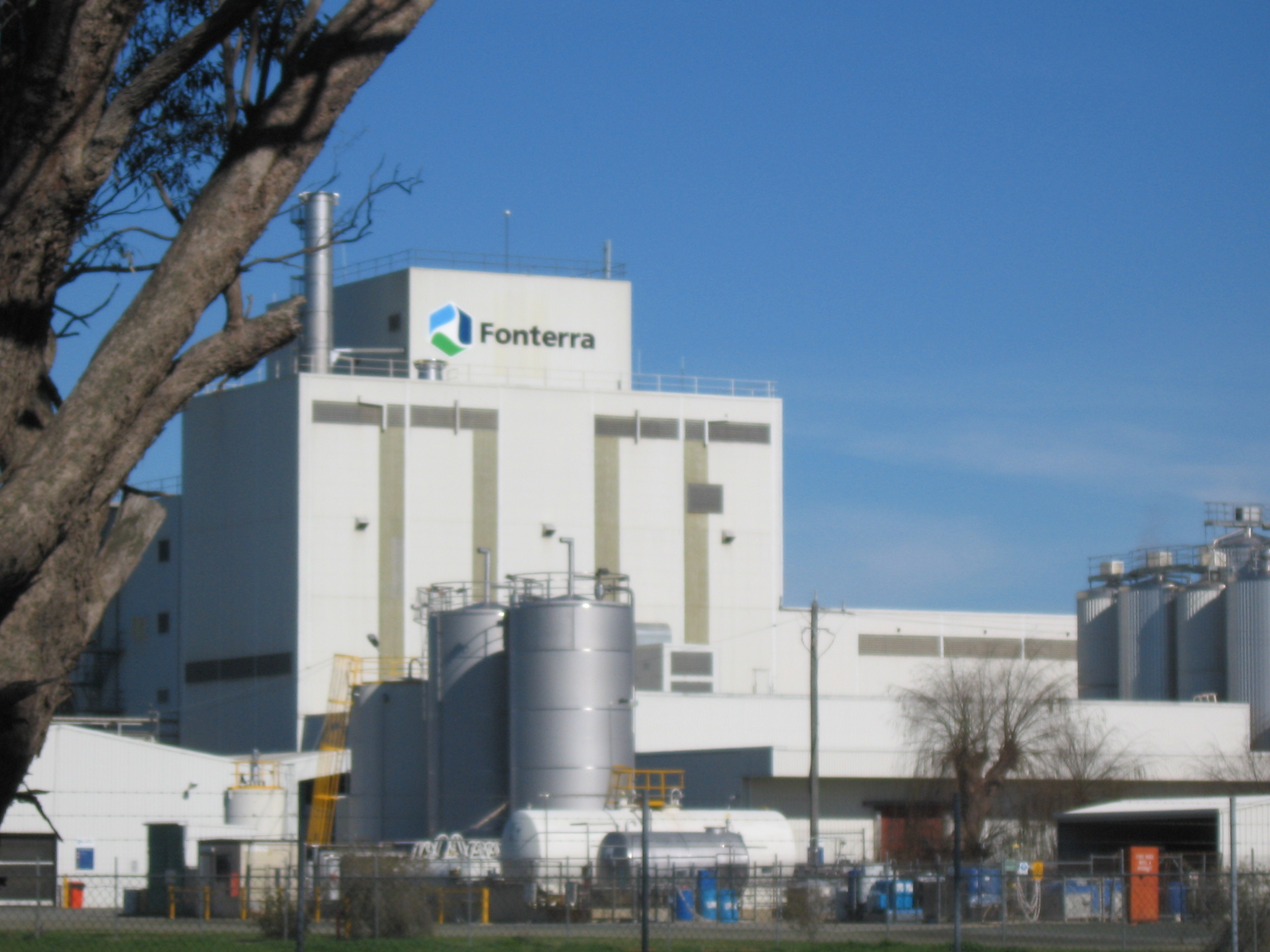
A cooperative dairy factory in Victoria.

As a region's farms become more productive, its comparative advantage in agricultural products increases, which means that it can produce these products at a lower opportunity cost than can other regions. Therefore, the region becomes more competitive on the world market, which means that it can attract more consumers since they are able to buy more of the products offered for the same amount of money. As productivity improvement leads to falling food prices, this automatically leads to increases in real income elsewhere.

Increases in agricultural productivity lead also to agricultural growth and can help to alleviate poverty in poor and developing countries, where agriculture often employs the greatest portion of the population. As farms become more productive, the wages earned by those who work in agriculture increase. At the same time, food prices decrease and food supplies become more stable. Labourers therefore have more money to spend on food as well as other products. This also leads to agricultural growth. People see that there is a greater opportunity to earn their living by farming and are attracted to agriculture either as owners of farms themselves or as labourers.

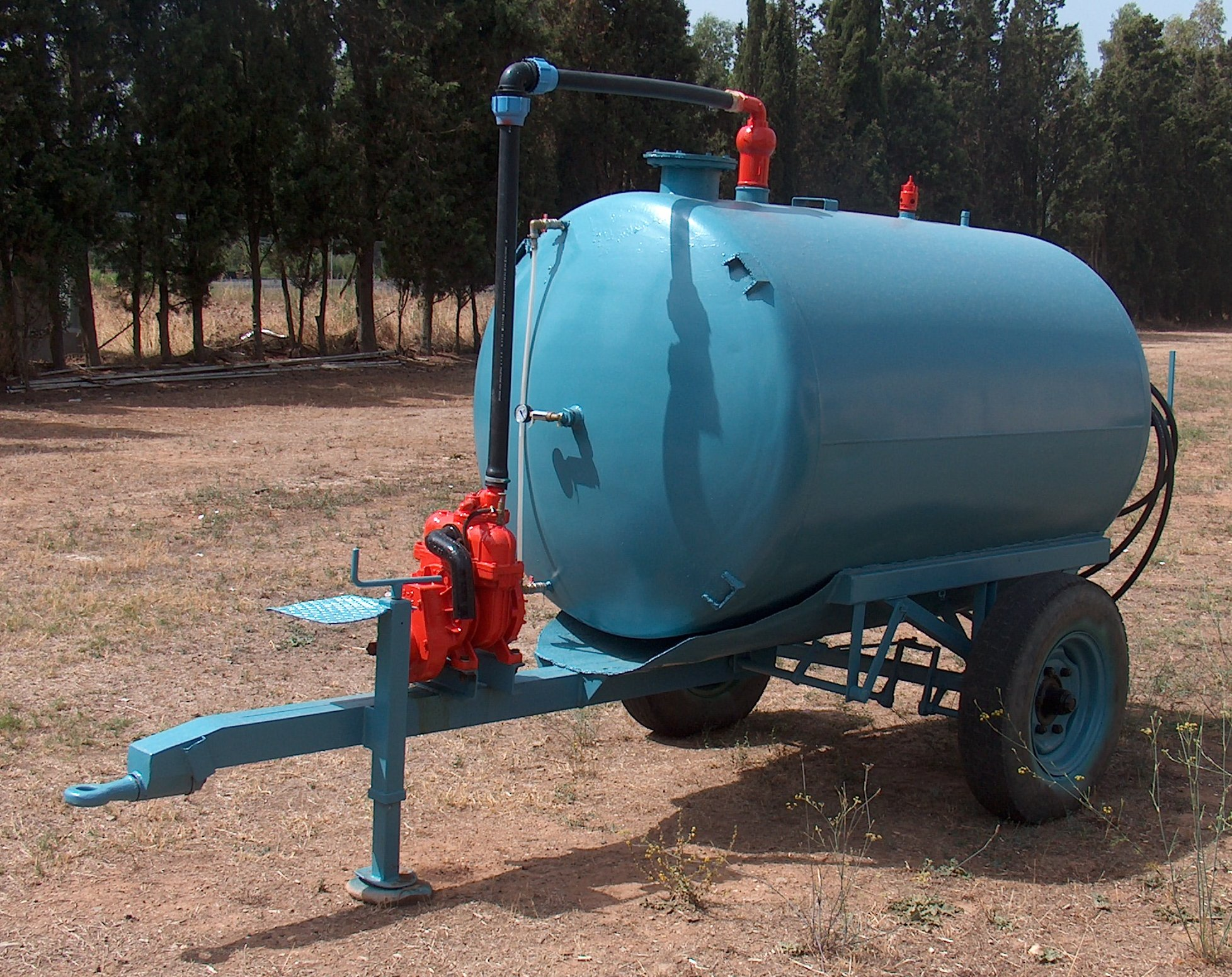
A liquid manure spreader.

It is not only the people employed in agriculture who benefit from increases in agricultural productivity. Those employed in other sectors also enjoy lower food prices and a more stable food supply. Their wages may also increase.

=== Food security ===
Agricultural productivity is becoming increasingly important as the world population continues to grow. As agricultural productivity grows, food prices decrease, allowing people to spend less on food, and combatting hunger. India, one of the world's most populous countries, has taken steps in the past decades to increase its land productivity. In the 1960s North India produced only wheat, but with the advent of the earlier maturing high-yielding wheats and rices, the wheat could be harvested in time to plant rice. This wheat/rice combination is now widely used throughout the Punjab, Haryana, and parts of Uttar Pradesh. The wheat yield of three tons and rice yield of two tons combine for five tons of grain per hectare, helping to feed India's 1.1 billion people.

World population supported with and without synthetic nitrogen fertilizers.

Higher global food prices between 2006 and 2008, primarily caused by an increasing amount arable land used for growing biofuels and the growing economies in China and elsewhere causing an increase in demand for meat products (which are less efficient than plants in terms of land use), caused the percentage of incomes used for food to increase throughout the world, forcing families to cut back on various other expenditures such as schooling for girls. In areas of sub-Saharan Africa, a decreased agricultural productivity due to crop failures has caused starvation. On the other hand, higher global prices actually mean farmers with successful yields earn more, and this thus increases their productivity.

Investing in the agricultural productivity of women in farming communities is of particular importance in boosting economic development and food security in parts of the developing world. Women in some areas of the world, for example in Africa, traditionally have less agency than men, but are often also more invested in farming in terms of time spent. They are furthermore generally more responsible for childcare, thus their productivity is more likely to translate in gains for the family as a whole.

=== Relation to population growth ===
World population since 1800 in billions. Data from the United Nations projections in 2019.

Some critics claim that increasing agricultural productivity results in human overpopulation. They are argue that, like other species, human populations grow up to their carrying capacity. When a species reaches its carrying capacity, the number of poor and weak individuals who die from disease or starvation is equal to the number of individuals being added to the population via birth. Because innovation continues to improve agricultural productivity (specifically yields), however, the theoretical carrying capacity continues to increase, allowing the human population to continue to grow. These writers claim that there are too many people on Earth and that therefore growth in agricultural productivity is detrimental to the environment — if the carrying capacity was lower, the human population would reach an equilibrium at a lower number.

However, unlike other animals, in humans greater development and prosperity has led to lower fecundity. Thus as productivity has increased and poverty has been reduced worldwide, population growth is declining. Research suggests we may actually face a declining world population in the future.

== Inverse relationship theory ==
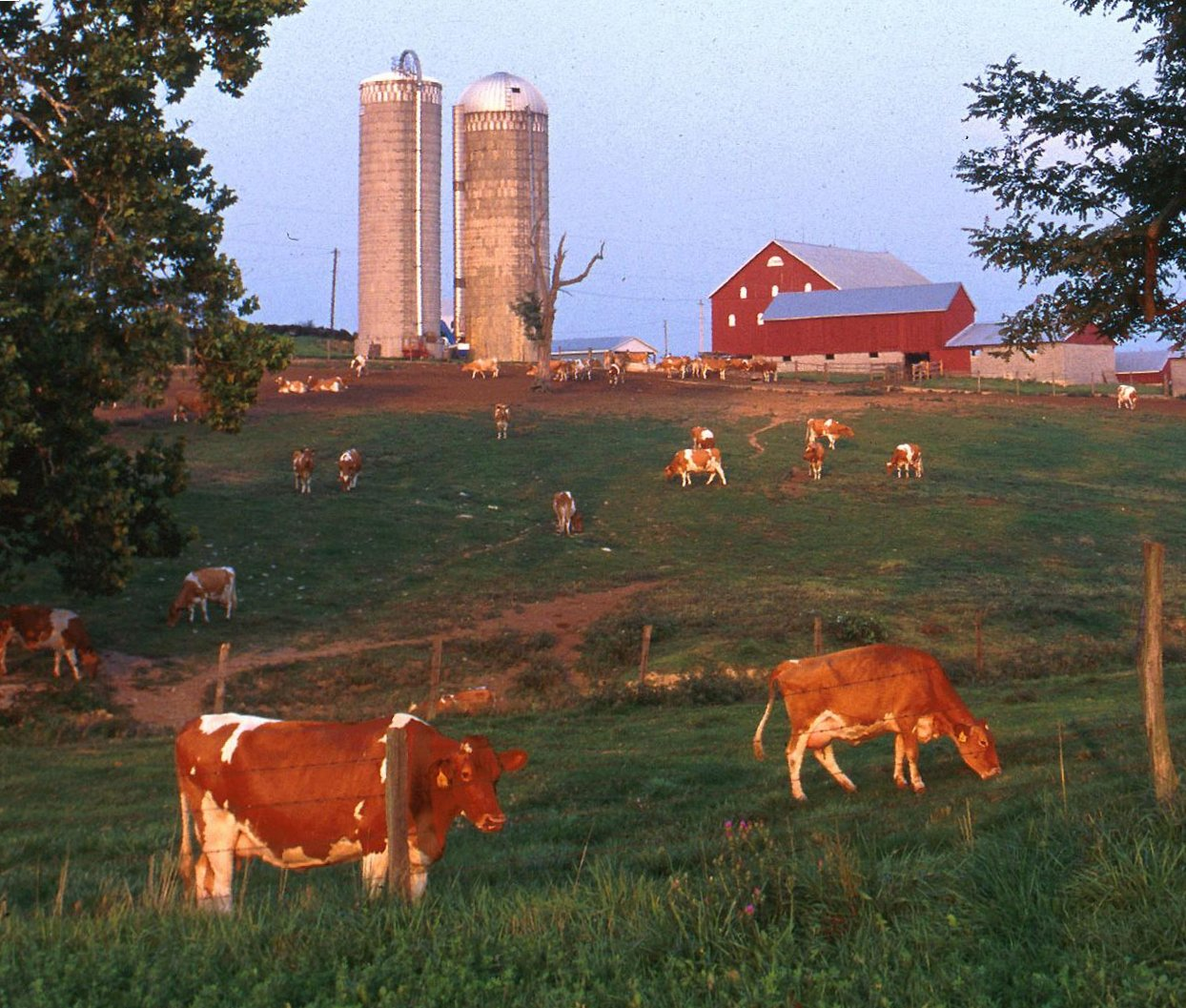
Dairy cattle in Maryland

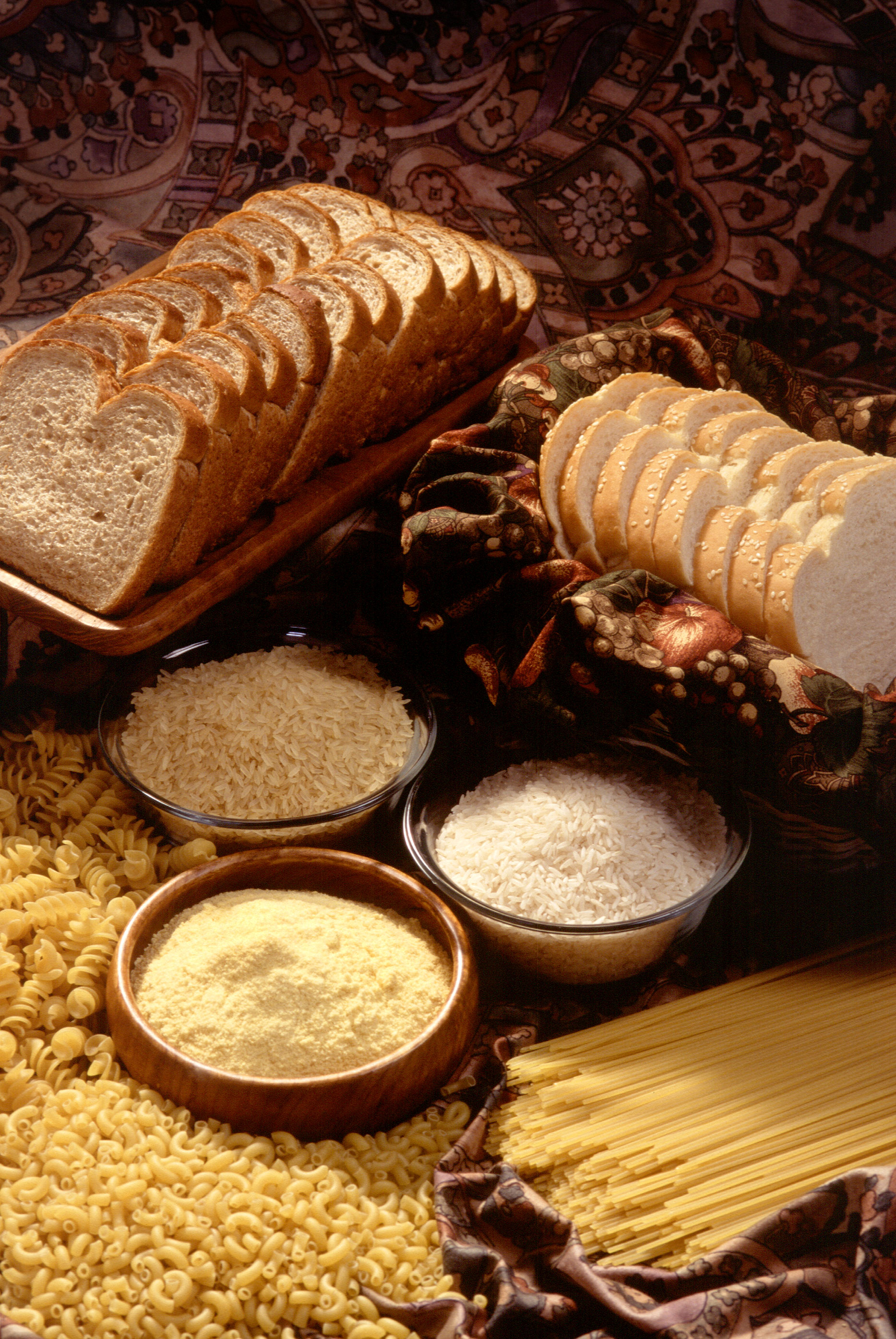
Some essential food products including bread, rice and pasta

Deolalikar in 1981 investigated the theory first proposed by Sen in 1975 that in traditional, pre-modern farming in India, there is an inverse relationship to size of the farm and productivity, contrary to the economy of scale found in all other types of economic activity. It is debated whether the inverse relationship actually exists. Numerous studies falsify this theory. In Zimbabwe, policies on agrarian land reform under president Robert Mugabe, especially in and following 2000, split large farms into many smaller farms, and this decreased productivity. Marxist agrarian land reform in the Soviet Union, China and Vietnam combined small farms into larger units, this usually failed to increase productivity.

Nonetheless, increasing agricultural productivity amongst smallholder farms is an important way to improve farmer livelihoods in the developing world.

== Sustainable increases in productivity ==
Because agriculture has such significant impacts on climate change and other environmental issues, intensification of agriculture, which would increase productivity per amount of land being farmed, is seen by some as an essential method for climate change mitigation, because farmers will not require more land, and are thus incentivized not to participate in further land degradation or deforestation. Implementing intensification through sustainable agriculture practices makes farming more sustainable in the long term, maintaining the ability of future generations to meet their own needs while conserving the environment. International policy, embodied in Sustainable Development Goal 2, focuses on improving these practices at a global level.

Not all effects of climate change will negatively affect agricultural productivity. The IPCC Special Report on Climate Change and Land and the Special Report on Global Warming of 1.5 °C both project mixed changes in the yields of crops as global warming happens with some breadbasket regions becoming less productive, while other crops increase ranges and productivity.

== See also ==
- Agricultural expansion – Growth of agricultural land in the 21st century
- Energy efficiency in agriculture
- Food vs. feed – Competition for resources between growing crops for human consumption and for animal feed
- Green Revolution – Agricultural developments in 1950s–1960s
- Mechanized agriculture – Agriculture using powered machinery
- Productivity – Average measure of the efficiency of production
- Productivity improving technologies (historical) – Technological innovations that have historically increased productivity
