= Food vs. fuel =

Debate concerning diversion of food supply for biofuels

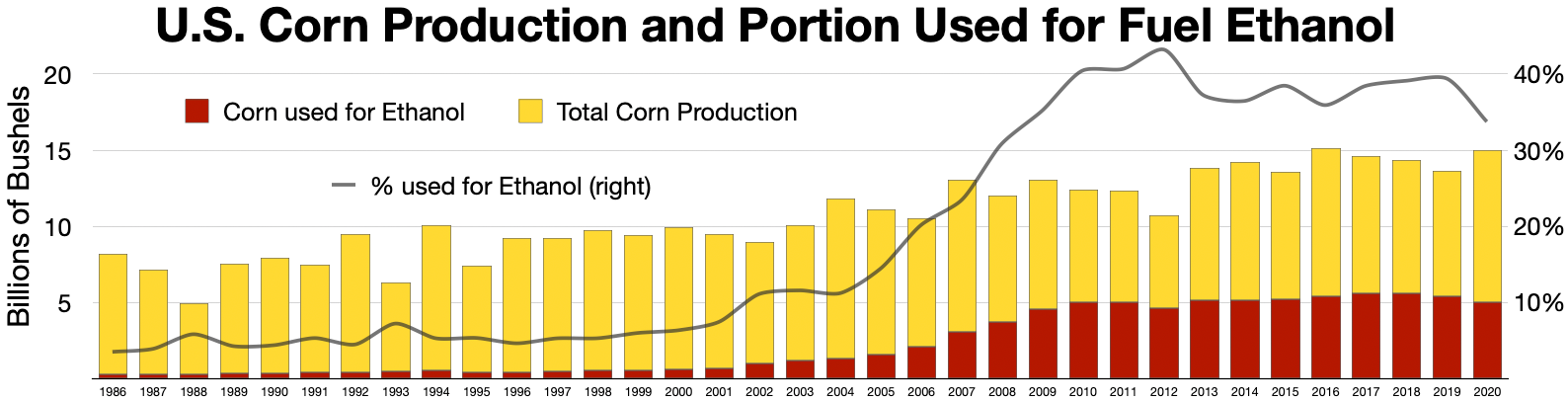
Corn vs ethanol production in the United States Total corn production (bushels) (left) Corn used for ethanol fuel (bushels) (left) Percent of corn used for ethanol (right)

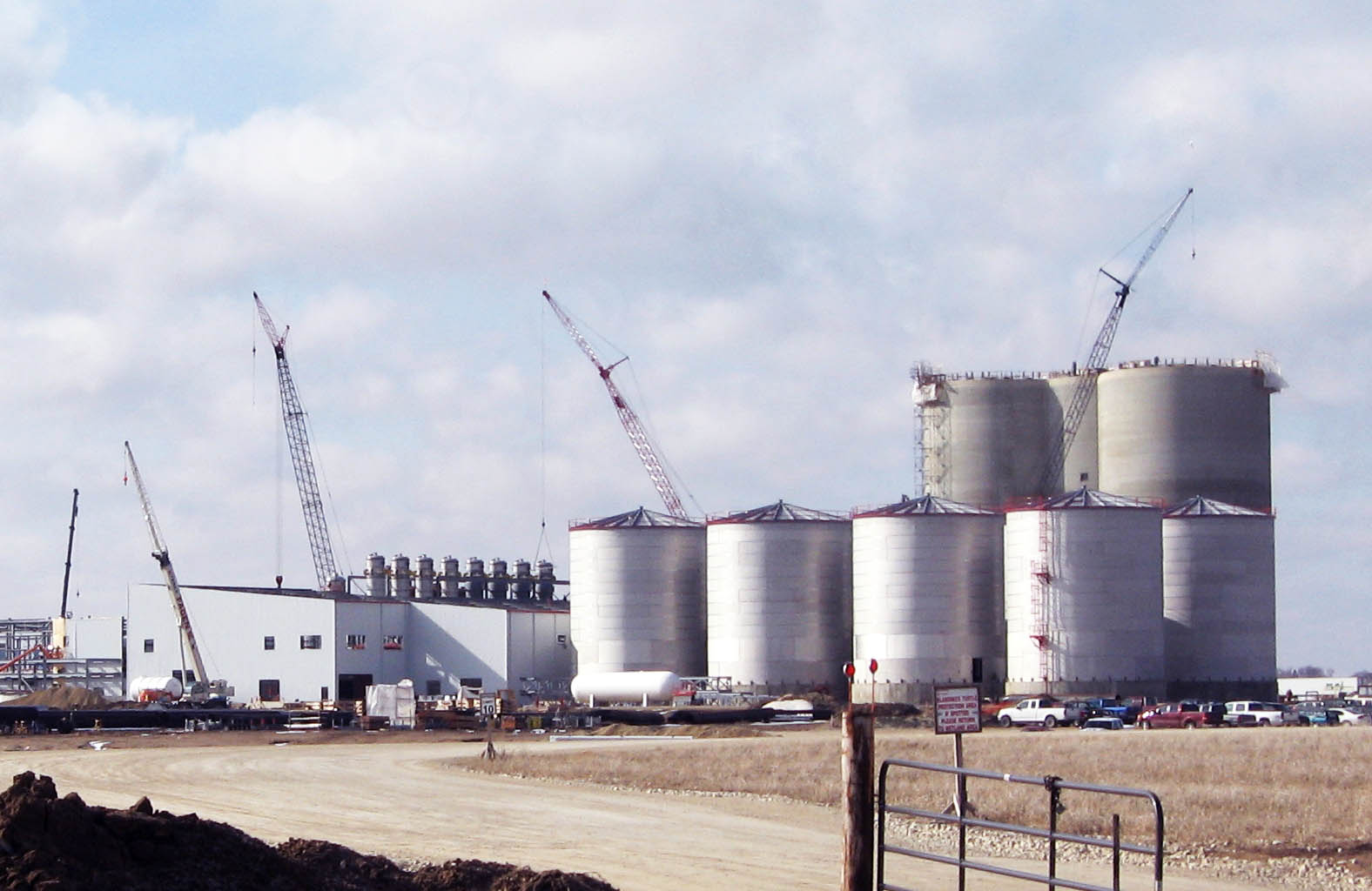
An ethanol fuel plant under construction, Butler County, Iowa

Food versus fuel is the dilemma regarding the risk of diverting farmland or crops for biofuel production to the detriment of the food supply. The biofuel and food price debate involves wide-ranging views and is a long-standing, controversial one in the literature. There is disagreement about the significance of the issue, what is causing it, and what can or should be done to remedy the situation. This complexity and uncertainty are due to the large number of impacts and feedback loops that can positively or negatively affect the price system. Moreover, the relative strengths of these positive and negative impacts vary in the short and long terms, and involve delayed effects. The academic side of the debate is also blurred by the use of different economic models and competing forms of statistical analysis.

Biofuel production has increased in recent years. Some commodities, like maize (corn), sugar cane or vegetable oil can be used either as food, feed, or to make biofuels. For example, since 2006, a portion of land that was also formerly used to grow food crops in the United States is now used to grow corn for biofuels, and a larger share of corn is destined for ethanol production, reaching approximately 37% in 2023. Oil price increases since 2003, the desire to reduce oil dependency, and the need to reduce greenhouse gas emissions from transportation have together increased global demand for biofuels. Increased demand tends to improve financial returns on production, making biofuel more profitable and attractive than food production. This, in turn, leads to greater resource inputs to biofuel production, with correspondingly reduced resources put towards the production of food. Global food security issues may result from such economic disincentives to large-scale agricultural food production. There is, in addition, potential for the destruction of habitats with increasing pressure to convert land use to agriculture, for the production of biofuel. Environmental groups have raised concerns about these potential harms for some years, but the issues drew widespread attention worldwide due to the 2007–2008 world food price crisis.

Second-generation biofuels could potentially provide solutions to these negative effects. For example, they may allow for combined farming for food and fuel, and electricity could be generated simultaneously. This could be especially beneficial for developing countries and rural areas in developed countries. Some research suggests that biofuel production can be significantly increased without the need for increased acreage.

Biofuels are not a new phenomenon. Before industrialisation, horses were the primary source of power for transportation and physical work, requiring food. The growing of crops for horses (typically oats) to carry out physical work is comparable to the growing of crops for biofuels used in engines. However, the earlier, pre-industrial "biofuel" crops were at smaller scale.

Brazil has been considered to have the world's first sustainable biofuels economy, and its government claims Brazil's sugar cane-based ethanol industry did not contribute to the 2008 food crisis. A World Bank policy research working paper released in July 2008 concluded that "large increases in biofuel production in the United States and Europe are the main reason behind the steep rise in global food prices" and also stated that "Brazil's sugar-based ethanol did not push food prices appreciably higher.". However, a 2010 study also by the World Bank concluded that their previous study may have overestimated the contribution of biofuel production, as "the effect of biofuels on food prices has not been as large as originally thought, but that the use of commodities by financial investors (the so-called "financialization of commodities") may have been partly responsible for the 2007/08 spike." A 2008 independent study by the OECD also found that the impact of biofuels on food prices are much smaller.

== Food price inflation ==
From 1974 to 2005, real food prices (adjusted for inflation) dropped by 75%. Food commodity prices were relatively stable after reaching lows in 2000 and 2001. Therefore, recent rapid food price increases are considered extraordinary. A World Bank policy research working paper published in July 2008 found that the increase in food commodity prices was led by grains, with sharp price increases in 2005 despite record crops worldwide. From January 2005 until June 2008, maize prices almost tripled, wheat increased 127 percent, and rice rose 170 percent. The increase in grain prices was followed by increases in fat and oil prices in mid-2006. On the other hand, the study found that sugar cane production has increased rapidly, and it was large enough to keep sugar price increases small except for 2005 and early 2006. The paper concluded that biofuels produced from grains have raised food prices in combination with other related factors by between 70 and 75 percent, but ethanol produced from sugar cane has not contributed significantly to the recent increase in food commodities prices.

An economic assessment report published by the OECD in July 2008 found that "the impact of current biofuel policies on world crop prices, largely through increased demand for cereals and vegetable oils, is significant but should not be overestimated. Current biofuel support measures alone are estimated to increase average wheat prices by about 5 percent, maize by around 7 percent and vegetable oil by about 19 percent over the next 10 years."

Corn is used to make ethanol and prices went up by a factor of three in less than 3 years (measured in US dollars). Reports in 2007 linked stories as diverse as food riots in Mexico due to rising prices of corn for tortillas and reduced profits at Heineken, the large international brewer, to the increasing use of corn (maize) grown in the US Midwest for ethanol production. In the case of beer, the barley area was cut in order to increase corn production. Barley is not currently used to produce ethanol.) Wheat is up by almost a factor of 3 in three years, while soybeans are up by a factor of 2 in two years (both measured in US dollars).

As corn is commonly used as feed for livestock, higher corn prices lead to higher prices for animal source foods. Vegetable oil is used to make biodiesel and has about doubled in price in the last couple years. The prices are roughly tracking crude oil prices. The 2007–2008 world food price crisis is blamed partly on the increased demand for biofuels. During the same period, rice prices went up by a factor of 3 even though rice is not directly used in biofuels.

The USDA expects the 2008/2009 wheat season to be a record crop and 8% higher than the previous year. They also expect rice to have a record crop. Wheat prices have dropped from a high of over $12 per bushel in May 2008 to under $8/bushel in May. Rice has also dropped from its highs.

According to a 2008 report from the World Bank, the production of biofuel pushed food prices up. These conclusions were supported by the Union of Concerned Scientists in their September 2008 newsletter, in which they remarked that the World Bank analysis "contradicts U.S. Secretary of Agriculture Ed Schaffer's assertion that biofuels account for only a small percentage of rising food prices".

According to the October Consumer Price Index released on November 19, 2008, food prices continued to rise in October 2008 and were 6.3 percent higher than in October 2007. Since July 2008, fuel costs dropped by nearly 60 percent.

== Proposed causes ==
=== Ethanol fuel as an oxygenate additive ===
The demand for ethanol fuel produced from field corn was spurred in the U.S. by the discovery that methyl tertiary butyl ether (MTBE) was contaminating groundwater. MTBE use as an oxygenate additive was widespread due to the mandates of the Clean Air Act amendments of 1992 to reduce carbon monoxide emissions. As a result, by 2006, MTBE use in gasoline was banned in almost 20 states. There was also concern that widespread and costly litigation might be taken against the U.S. gasoline suppliers, and a 2005 decision refusing legal protection for MTBE, opened a new market for ethanol fuel, the primary substitute for MTBE. At a time when corn prices were around US$2 a bushel, corn growers recognized the potential of this new market and delivered accordingly. This demand shift took place at a time when oil prices were already significantly rising.

=== Other factors ===
The fact that food prices went up at the same time fuel prices went up is not surprising and should not be entirely blamed on biofuels. Energy costs are a significant cost for fertilizer, farming, and food distribution. Also, China and other countries have had significant increases in their imports as their economies have grown. Sugar is one of the main feedstocks for ethanol, and prices are down from two years ago. Part of the food price increase for international food commodities measured in US dollars is due to the dollar being devalued. Protectionism is also an important contributor to price increases. 36% of world grain goes as fodder to feed animals, rather than people.

Over long periods of time, population growth and climate change could cause food prices to go up. However, these factors have been around for many years and food prices have jumped up in the last three years, so their contribution to the current problem is minimal.

=== Government regulations of food and fuel markets ===
France, Germany, the United Kingdom, and the United States governments have supported biofuels with tax breaks, mandated use, and subsidies. These policies have the unintended consequence of diverting resources from food production and leading to surging food prices and the potential destruction of natural habitats.

Fuel for agricultural use often does not have fuel taxes (farmers get duty-free petrol or diesel fuel). Biofuels may have subsidies and low/no retail fuel taxes. Biofuels compete with retail gasoline and diesel prices which have substantial taxes included. The net result is that it is possible for a farmer to use more than a gallon of fuel to make a gallon of biofuel and still make a profit. There have been thousands of scholarly papers analyzing how much energy goes into making ethanol from corn and how that compares to the energy in the ethanol.

A World Bank policy research working paper concluded that food prices have risen by 35 to 40 percent between 2002 and 2008, of which 70 to 75 percent are attributable to biofuels. The "month-by-month" five-year analysis disputes that increases in global grain consumption and droughts were responsible for significant price increases, reporting that this had only a marginal impact. Instead, the report argues that the EU and US drive for biofuels has had by far the biggest impact on food supply and prices, as increased production of biofuels in the US and EU was supported by subsidies and tariffs on imports, and considers that without these policies, price increases would have been smaller. This research also concluded that Brazil's sugar cane-based ethanol has not raised sugar prices significantly and recommends removing tariffs on ethanol imports by both the US and EU, to allow more efficient producers such as Brazil and other developing countries, including many African countries, to produce ethanol profitably for export to meet the mandates in the EU and the US.

An economic assessment published by the OECD in July 2008 agrees with the World Bank report recommendations regarding the negative effects of subsidies and import tariffs but finds that the estimated impact of biofuels on food prices is much smaller. The OECD study found that trade restrictions, mainly through import tariffs, protect the domestic industry from foreign competitors but impose a cost burden on domestic biofuel users and limit alternative suppliers. The report is also critical of limited reduction of greenhouse gas emissions achieved from biofuels based on feedstocks used in Europe and North America, finding that the current biofuel support policies would reduce greenhouse gas emissions from transport fuel by no more than 0.8% by 2015, while Brazilian ethanol from sugar cane reduces greenhouse gas emissions by at least 80% compared to fossil fuels. The assessment calls for the need for more open markets in biofuels and feedstocks in order to improve efficiency and lower costs.

=== Oil price increases ===
Oil price increases since 2003 resulted in increased demand for biofuels. Transforming vegetable oil into biodiesel is not very hard or costly, so there is a profitable arbitrage situation if vegetable oil is much cheaper than diesel. Diesel is also made from crude oil, so vegetable oil prices are partially linked to crude oil prices. Farmers can switch to growing vegetable oil crops if those are more profitable than food crops. So all food prices are linked to vegetable oil prices and, in turn, to crude oil prices. A World Bank study concluded that oil prices and a weak dollar explain 25–30% of the total price rise between January 2002 until June 2008.

Demand for oil is outstripping the supply of oil and oil depletion is expected to cause crude oil prices to go up over the next 50 years. Record oil prices are inflating food prices worldwide, including those crops that have no relation to biofuels, such as rice and fish.

In Germany and Canada, it is now much cheaper to heat a house by burning grain than by using fuel derived from crude oil. With oil at $120 per barrel, a savings of a factor of 3 on heating costs is possible. When crude oil was at $25/barrel there was no economic incentive to switch to a grain fed heater.

From 1971 to 1973, around the time of the 1973 oil crisis, corn and wheat prices went up by a factor of 3. There was no significant biofuel usage at that time.

=== US government policy ===
Some argue that the US government's policy of encouraging ethanol from corn is the main cause of food price increases. US federal government ethanol subsidies total $7 billion per year, or $1.90 per gallon. Ethanol provides only 55% as much energy as gasoline per gallon, realizing about a $3.45 per gallon gasoline trade off. Corn is used to feed chickens, cows, and pigs, so higher corn prices lead to higher prices for chicken, beef, pork, milk, cheese, etc.

U.S. Senators introduced the BioFuels Security Act in 2006. "It's time for Congress to realize what farmers in America's heartland have known all along: that we have the capacity and ingenuity to decrease our dependence on foreign oil by growing our own fuel", said U.S. Senator for Illinois Barack Obama.

Two-thirds of U.S. oil consumption is due to the transportation sector. The Energy Independence and Security Act of 2007 has a significant impact on U.S. Energy Policy. With the high profitability of growing corn, more and more farmers switch to growing corn until the profitability of other crops matches that of corn. So the ethanol/corn subsidies drive up the prices of other farm crops.

The US, an important export country for food stocks - will convert 18% of its grain output to ethanol in 2008. Across the US, 25% of the whole corn crop went to ethanol in 2007. The percentage of corn going to biofuel is expected to go up.

Since 2004, a US subsidy has been paid to companies that blend biofuel and regular fuel. The European biofuel subsidy is paid at the point of sale. Companies import biofuel to the US, blend 1% or even 0.1% regular fuel, and then ship the blended fuel to Europe, where it can get a second subsidy. These blends are called B99 or B99.9 fuel. The practice is called "splash and dash.". The imported fuel may even come from Europe to the US, get 0.1% regular fuel, and then go back to Europe. For B99.9 fuel the US blender gets a subsidy of $0.999 per gallon. The European biodiesel producers have urged the EU to impose punitive duties on these subsidized imports. In 2007, US lawmakers were also looking at closing this loophole.

=== Freeze on first generation biofuel production ===
The prospects for the use of biofuels could change in a relatively dramatic way in 2014. Petroleum trade groups petitioned the EPA in August 2013 to take into consideration a reduction of renewable biofuel content in transportation fuels. On November 15, 2013, the United States EPA announced a review of the proportion of ethanol that should be required by regulation. The standards established by the Energy Independence and Security Act of 2007 could be modified significantly. The announcement allows sixty days for the submission of commentary about the proposal. Journalist George Monbiot has argued for a 5-year freeze on biofuels while their impact on poor communities and the environment is assessed.

A 2007 UN report on biofuel also raises issues regarding food security and biofuel production. Jean Ziegler, then UN Special Rapporteur on food, concluded that while the argument for biofuels in terms of energy efficiency and climate change are legitimate, the effects for the world's hungry of transforming wheat and maize crops into biofuel are "absolutely catastrophic", and terms such use of arable land a "crime against humanity". Ziegler also calls for a five-year moratorium on biofuel production. Ziegler's proposal for a five-year ban was rejected by the U.N. Secretary Ban Ki-moon, who called for a comprehensive review of the policies on biofuels, and said that "just criticising biofuel may not be a good solution".

Food surpluses exist in many developed countries. For example, the UK wheat surplus was around 2 million tonnes in 2005. This surplus alone could produce sufficient bioethanol to replace around 2.5% of the UK's petroleum consumption, without requiring any increase in wheat cultivation or reduction in food supply or exports. However, above a few percent, there would be direct competition between first generation biofuel production and food production. This is one reason why many view second-generation biofuels as increasingly important.

=== Non-food crops for biofuel ===
There are different types of biofuels and different feedstocks for them, and it has been proposed that only non-food crops be used for biofuel. This avoids direct competition for commodities like corn and edible vegetable oil. However, as long as farmers are able to derive a greater profit by switching to biofuels, they will. The law of supply and demand predicts that if fewer farmers are producing food the price of food will rise.

Second-generation biofuels use lignocellulosic raw material such as forest residues (sometimes referred to as brown waste and black liquor from Kraft process or sulfite process pulp mills). Third generation biofuels (biofuel from algae) use non-edible raw materials sources that can be used for biodiesel and bioethanol.

The supply of agricultural cellulose, which is a lignocellulosic material commonly referred to as "Nature's polymer", is widely considered an ideal source of material for biofuels and many other products as it doesn’t use up food sources. Composed of lignin and monomer sugars such as glucose, fructose, arabinose, galactose, and xylose, these constituents are very valuable in their own right. To this point in history, there are some methods commonly used to coax "recalcitrant" cellulose to separate or hydrolyse into its lignin and sugar parts, treatment with; steam explosion, supercritical water, enzymes, acids and alkalines. All these methods involve heat or chemicals, are expensive, have lower conversion rates and produce waste materials. In recent years the rise of "mechanochemistry" has resulted in the use of ball mills and other mill designs to reduce cellulose to a fine powder in the presence of a catalyst, a common bentonite or kaolinite clay, that will hydrolyse the cellulose quickly and with low energy input into pure sugar and lignin. Still currently only in pilot stage, this promising technology offers the possibility that any agricultural economy might be able to get rid of its requirement to refine oil for transportation fuels. This would be an improvement in carbon neutral energy sources and allow the continued use of internal combustion engines on a large scale.

==== Biodiesel ====
Soybean oil, which only represents half of the domestic raw materials available for biodiesel production in the United States, is one of many raw materials that can be used to produce biodiesel.

Non-food crops like Camelina, Jatropha, seashore mallow and mustard, used for biodiesel, can thrive on marginal agricultural land where many trees and crops will not grow, or would produce only slow growth yields. Camelina is virtually 100 percent efficient. It can be harvested and crushed for oil and the remaining parts can be used to produce high quality omega-3 rich animal feed, fiberboard, and glycerin. Camelina does not take away from land currently being utilized for food production. Most camelina acres are grown in areas that were previously not utilized for farming. For example, areas that receive limited rainfall that can not sustain corn or soybeans without the addition of irrigation can grow camelina and add to their profitability.

Jatropha cultivation provides benefits for local communities:

Cultivation and fruit picking by hand is labour-intensive and needs around one person per hectare. In parts of rural India and Africa this provides much-needed jobs - about 200,000 people worldwide now find employment through jatropha. Moreover, villagers often find that they can grow other crops in the shade of the trees. Their communities will avoid importing expensive diesel and there will be some for export too.

NBB's Feedstock Development program is addressing production of arid variety crops, algae, waste greases, and other feedstocks on the horizon to expand available material for biodiesel in a sustainable manner.

==== Bioalcohols ====
Cellulosic ethanol is a type of biofuel produced from lignocellulose, a material that comprises much of the mass of plants. Corn stover, switchgrass, miscanthus and woodchip are some of the more popular non-edible cellulosic materials for ethanol production. Commercial investment in such second-generation biofuels began in 2006/2007, and much of this investment went beyond pilot-scale plants. Cellulosic ethanol commercialization is moving forward rapidly. The world's first commercial wood-to-ethanol plant began operation in Japan in 2007, with a capacity of 1.4 million liters/year. The first wood-to-ethanol plant in the United States is planned for 2008 with an initial output of 75 million liters/year.

Other second-generation biofuels may be commercialized in the future and compete less with food. Synthetic fuel can be made from coal or biomass and may be commercialized soon.

==== Bioprotein ====
Protein rich feed for cattle/fish/poultry can be produced from biogas/natural gas which is presently used as fuel source. Cultivation of Methylococcus capsulatus bacteria culture by consuming natural gas produces high protein rich feed with tiny land and water foot print. The carbon dioxide gas produced as by product from these plants can also be put to use in cheaper production of algae oil or spirulina from algaculture which can displace the prime position of crude oil in near future. With these proven technologies, abundant natural gas/ biogas availability can impart full global food security by producing highly nutrient food products without any water pollution or greenhouse gas (GHG) emissions.

=== Biofuel from food byproducts and coproducts ===
Biofuels can also be produced from the waste byproducts of food-based agriculture (such as citrus peels or used vegetable oil) to manufacture an environmentally sustainable fuel supply, and reduce waste disposal cost.

A growing percentage of U.S. biodiesel production is made from waste vegetable oil (recycled restaurant oils) and greases.

Collocation of a waste generator with a waste-to-ethanol plant can reduce the waste producer's operating cost, while creating a more-profitable ethanol production business. This innovative collocation concept is sometimes called holistic systems engineering. Collocation disposal elimination may be one of the few cost-effective, environmentally sound, biofuel strategies, but its scalability is limited by availability of appropriate waste generation sources. For example, millions of tons of wet Florida-and-California citrus peels cannot supply billions of gallons of biofuels. Due to the higher cost of transporting ethanol, it is a local partial solution, at best.

=== Biofuel subsidies and tariffs ===
Some people have claimed that ending subsidies and tariffs would enable sustainable development of a global biofuels market. Taxing biofuel imports while letting petroleum in duty-free does not fit with the goal of encouraging biofuels. Ending mandates, subsidies, and tariffs would end the distortions that current policy is causing. The US ethanol tariff and some US ethanol subsidies are currently set to expire over the next couple years. The EU is rethinking their biofuels directive due to environmental and social concerns. On 18 January 2008 the UK House of Commons Environmental Audit Committee raised similar concerns, and called for a moratorium on biofuel targets. Germany ended their subsidy of biodiesel on 1 January 2008 and started taxing it.

=== Reduce farmland reserves and set asides ===
To avoid overproduction and to prop up farmgate prices for agricultural commodities, the EU has for a long time have had farm subsidy programs to encourage farmers not to produce and leave productive acres fallow. The 2008 crisis prompted proposals to bring some of the reserve farmland back into use, and the used area increased actually with 0.5% but today these areas are once again out of use. According to Eurostat, 18 million hectares has been abandoned since 1990, 7,4 millions hectares are currently set aside, and the EU has recently decided to set aside another 5–7% in so called Ecological Focus Areas, corresponding to 10–12 million hectares. In spite of this reduction of used land, the EU is a net exporter of e.g. wheat.

The American Bakers Association has proposed reducing the amount of farmland held in the US Conservation Reserve Program. Currently the US has 34,500,000 acres (140,000 km^{2}) in the program.

In Europe about 8% of the farmland is in set aside programs. Farmers have proposed freeing up all of this for farming. Two-thirds of the farmers who were on these programs in the UK are not renewing when their term expires.

=== Sustainable production of biofuels ===
Second-generation biofuels are now being produced from the cellulose in dedicated energy crops (such as perennial grasses), forestry materials, the co-products from food production, and domestic vegetable waste. Advances in the conversion processes will almost certainly improve the sustainability of biofuels, through better efficiencies and reduced environmental impact of producing biofuels, from both existing food crops and from cellulosic sources.

Lord Ron Oxburgh suggests that responsible production of biofuels has several advantages:

Produced responsibly they are a sustainable energy source that need not divert any land from growing food nor damage the environment; they can also help solve the problems of the waste generated by Western society; and they can create jobs for the poor where previously were none. Produced irresponsibly, they at best offer no climate benefit and, at worst, have detrimental social and environmental consequences. In other words, biofuels are pretty much like any other product.

Far from creating food shortages, responsible production and distribution of biofuels is an opportunity for sustainable economic prospects in Africa, Latin America and impoverished Asia. Biofuels offer the prospect of market competition and oil price moderation. Crude oil would be trading 15 per cent higher and gasoline would be as much approximately 25 per cent more expensive, if it were not for biofuels. A supply of alternative energy sources combats gasoline price spikes.

=== Continuation of the status quo ===
An additional policy option is to continue the current trends of government incentive for these types of crops to further evaluate the effects on food prices over a longer period of time due to the relatively recent onset of the biofuel production industry. Additionally, by virtue of the newness of the industry we can assume that like other startup industries techniques and alternatives will be cultivated quickly if there is sufficient demand for the alternative fuels and biofuels. What could result from the shock to food prices is a very quick move toward some of the non-food biofuels as are listed above amongst the other policy alternatives.

== Impact on developing countries ==
Demand for fuel in rich countries is now competing against demand for food in poor countries. The increase in world grain consumption in 2006 happened due to the increase in consumption for fuel, not human consumption. The grain required to fill a 25 US gallons (95 L) fuel tank with ethanol will feed one person for a year.

Several factors combine to make recent grain and oilseed price increases impact poor countries more:

- Poor people buy more grains (e.g. wheat), and are more exposed to grain price changes.
- Poor people spend a higher portion of their income on food, so increasing food prices influence them more.
- Aid organizations which buy food and send it to poor countries see more need when prices go up but are able to buy less food on the same budget.

The impact is not all negative. The Food and Agriculture Organization (FAO) recognizes the potential opportunities that the growing biofuel market offers to small farmers and aquaculturers around the world and has recommended small-scale financing to help farmers in poor countries produce local biofuel.

On the other hand, poor countries that do substantial farming have increased profits due to biofuels. If vegetable oil prices double, the profit margin could more than double. In the past rich countries have been dumping subsidized grains at below cost prices into poor countries and hurting the local farming industries. With biofuels using grains the rich countries no longer have grain surpluses to get rid of. Farming in poor countries is seeing healthier profit margins and expanding.

Interviews with local farmers in southern Ecuador provide strong anecdotal evidence that the high price of corn is encouraging the burning of tropical forests in order to grow more. The destruction of tropical forests now account for 20% of all greenhouse gas emissions.

== National Corn Growers Association ==
US government subsidies for making ethanol from corn have been attacked as the main cause of the food vs fuel problem. To defend themselves, the National Corn Growers Association has published their views on this issue. They consider the "food vs fuel" argument to be a fallacy that is "fraught with misguided logic, hyperbole and scare tactics."

Claims made by the NCGA include:

- Corn growers have been and will continue to produce enough corn so that supply and demand meet and there is no shortage. Farmers make their planting decisions based on signals from the marketplace. If demand for corn is high and projected revenue-per-acre is strong relative to other crops, farmers will plant more corn. In 2007 US farmers planted 92,900,000 acres (376,000 km^{2}) with corn, 19% more acres than they did in 2006.
- The U.S. has doubled corn yields over the last 40 years and expects to double them again in the next 20 years. With twice as much corn from each acre, corn can be put to new uses without taking food from the hungry or causing deforestation.
- US consumers buy things like corn flakes where the cost of the corn per box is around 5 cents. Most of the cost is packaging, advertising, shipping, etc. Only about 19% of the US retail food prices can be attributed to the actual cost of food inputs like grains and oilseeds. So if the price of a bushel of corn goes up, there may be no noticeable impact on US retail food prices. The US retail food price index has gone up only a few percent per year and is expected to continue to have very small increases.
- Most of the corn produced in the US is field corn, not sweet corn, and not digestible by humans in its raw form. Most corn is used for livestock feed and not human food, even the portion that is exported.
- Only the starch portion of corn kernels is converted to ethanol. The rest (protein, fat, vitamins and minerals) is passed through to the feed co-products or human food ingredients.
- One of the most significant and immediate benefits of higher grain prices is a dramatic reduction in federal farm support payments. According to the U.S. Department of Agriculture, corn farmers received $8.8 billion in government support in 2006. Because of higher corn prices, payments are expected to drop to $2.1 billion in 2007, a 76 percent reduction.
- While the EROEI and economics of corn based ethanol are a bit weak, it paves the way for cellulosic ethanol which should have much better EROEI and economics.
- While basic nourishment is clearly important, fundamental societal needs of energy, mobility, and energy security are too. If farmers crops can help their country in these areas also, it seems right to do so.

Since reaching record high prices in June 2008, corn prices fell 50% by October 2008, declining sharply together with other commodities, including oil. According to a Reuters article, "Analysts, including some in the ethanol sector, say ethanol demand adds about 75 cents to $1.00 per bushel to the price of corn, as a rule of thumb. Other analysts say it adds around 20 percent, or just under 80 cents per bushel at current prices. Those estimates hint that $4 per bushel corn might be priced at only $3 without demand for ethanol fuel.". These industry sources consider that a speculative bubble in the commodity markets holding positions in corn futures was the main driver behind the observed hike in corn prices affecting food supply.

== Controversy within the international system ==
The United States and Brazil lead the industrial world in global ethanol production, with Brazil as the world's largest exporter and biofuel industry leader. In 2006 the U.S. produced 18.4 billion liters (4.86 billion gallons), closely followed by Brazil with 16.3 billion liters (4.3 billion gallons), producing together 70% of the world's ethanol market and nearly 90% of ethanol used as fuel. These countries are followed by China with 7.5%, and India with 3.7% of the global market share.

Since 2007, the concerns, criticisms and controversy surrounding the food vs biofuels issue has reached the international system, mainly heads of states, and inter-governmental organizations (IGOs), such as the United Nations and several of its agencies, particularly the Food and Agriculture Organization (FAO) and the World Food Programme (WFP); the International Monetary Fund; the World Bank; and agencies within the European Union.

=== The 2007 controversy: Ethanol diplomacy in the Americas ===
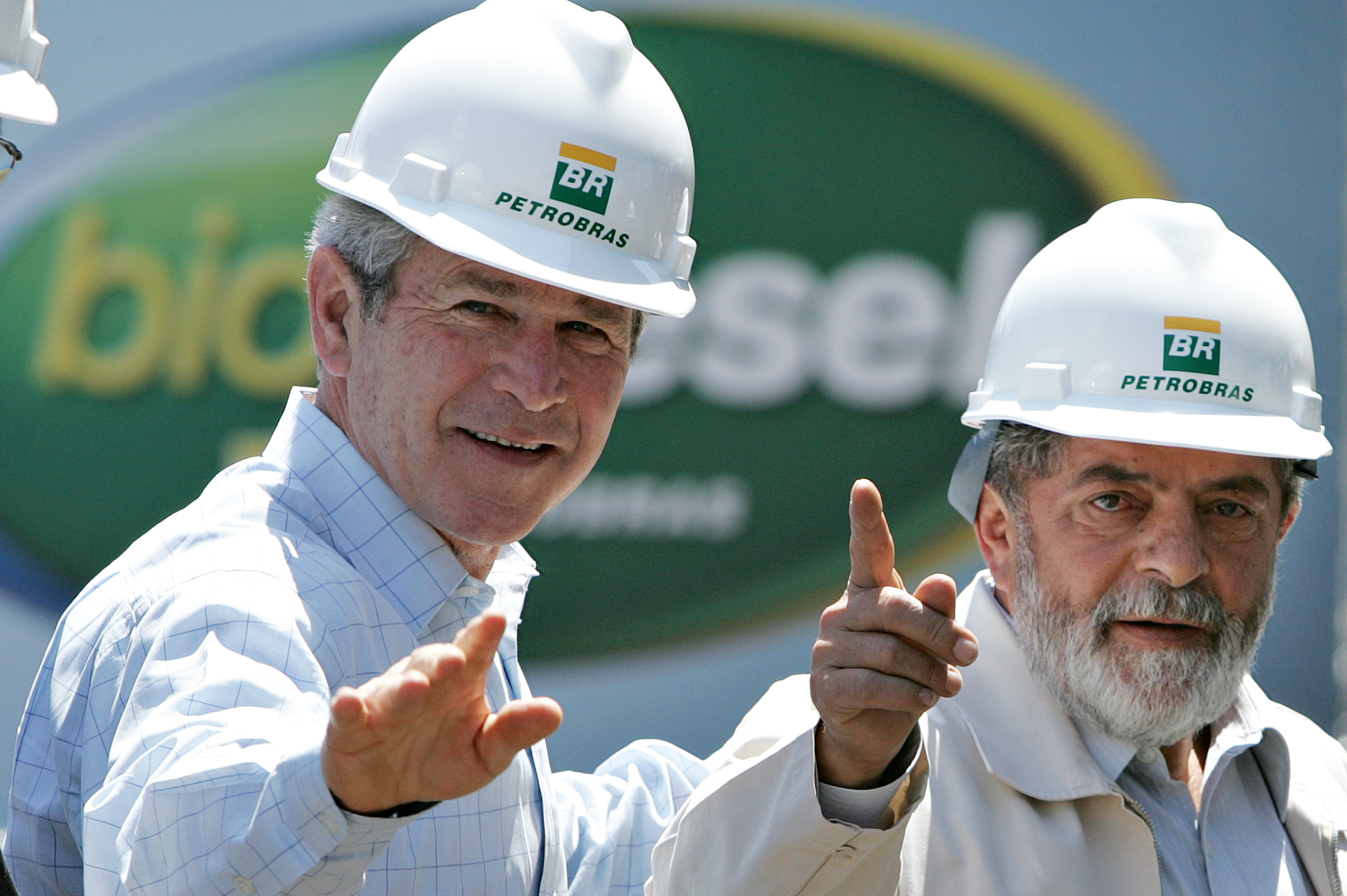
Presidents Luiz Inácio Lula da Silva and George W. Bush during Bush's visit to Brazil, March 2007

In March 2007, "ethanol diplomacy" was the focus of President George W. Bush's Latin American tour, in which he and Brazil's president, Luiz Inácio Lula da Silva, were seeking to promote the production and use of sugar cane based ethanol throughout Latin America and the Caribbean. The two countries also agreed to share technology and set international standards for biofuels. The Brazilian sugar cane technology transfer will permit various Central American countries, such as Honduras, Nicaragua, Costa Rica and Panama, several Caribbean countries, and various Andean Countries tariff-free trade with the U.S. thanks to existing concessionary trade agreements. Even though the U.S. imposes a US$0.54 tariff on every gallon of imported ethanol, the Caribbean nations and countries in the Central American Free Trade Agreement are exempt from such duties if they produce ethanol from crops grown in their own countries. The expectation is that using Brazilian technology for refining sugar cane based ethanol, such countries could become exporters to the United States in the short-term. In August 2007, Brazil's president toured Mexico and several countries in Central America and the Caribbean to promote Brazilian ethanol technology.

This alliance between the U.S. and Brazil generated some negative reactions. While Bush was in São Paulo as part of the 2007 Latin American tour, Venezuela's President Hugo Chavez, from Buenos Aires, dismissed the ethanol plan as "a crazy thing" and accused the U.S. of trying "to substitute the production of foodstuffs for animals and human beings with the production of foodstuffs for vehicles, to sustain the American way of life." Chavez' complaints were quickly followed by then Cuban President Fidel Castro, who wrote that "you will see how many people among the hungry masses of our planet will no longer consume corn." "Or even worse", he continued, "by offering financing to poor countries to produce ethanol from corn or any other kind of food, no tree will be left to defend humanity from climate change." Daniel Ortega, Nicaragua's president, and one of the preferential recipients of Brazil technical aid, said that "we reject the gibberish of those who applaud Bush's totally absurd proposal, which attacks the food security rights of Latin Americans and Africans, who are major corn consumers", however, he voiced support for sugar cane based ethanol during Lula's visit to Nicaragua.

=== The 2008 controversy: Global food prices ===
As a result of the international community's concerns regarding the steep increase in food prices, on 14 April 2008, Jean Ziegler, the United Nations Special Rapporteur on the Right to Food, at the Thirtieth Regional Conference of the Food and Agriculture Organization (FAO) in Brasília, called biofuels a "crime against humanity", a claim he had previously made in October 2007, when he called for a 5-year ban for the conversion of land for the production of biofuels. The previous day, at their Annual International Monetary Fund and World Bank Group meeting at Washington, D.C., the World Bank's President, Robert Zoellick, stated that "While many worry about filling their gas tanks, many others around the world are struggling to fill their stomachs. And it's getting more and more difficult every day."

Luiz Inácio Lula da Silva gave a strong rebuttal, calling both claims "fallacies resulting from commercial interests", and putting the blame instead on U.S. and European agricultural subsidies, and a problem restricted to U.S. ethanol produced from maize. He also said that "biofuels aren't the villain that threatens food security". In the middle of this new wave of criticism, Hugo Chavez reaffirmed his opposition and said that he is concerned that "so much U.S.-produced corn could be used to make biofuel, instead of feeding the world's poor", calling the U.S. initiative to boost ethanol production during a world food crisis a "crime".

German Chancellor Angela Merkel said the rise in food prices is due to poor agricultural policies and changing eating habits in developing nations, not biofuels as some critics claim. On the other hand, British Prime Minister Gordon Brown called for international action and said Britain had to be "selective" in supporting biofuels, and depending on the UK's assessment of biofuels' impact on world food prices, "we will also push for change in EU biofuels targets". Stavros Dimas, European Commissioner for the Environment said through a spokeswoman that "there is no question for now of suspending the target fixed for biofuels", though he acknowledged that the EU had underestimated problems caused by biofuels.

On 29 April 2008, U.S. President George W. Bush declared during a press conference that "85 percent of the world's food prices are caused by weather, increased demand and energy prices", and recognized that "15 percent has been caused by ethanol". He added that "the high price of gasoline is going to spur more investment in ethanol as an alternative to gasoline. And the truth of the matter is it's in our national interests that our farmers grow energy, as opposed to us purchasing energy from parts of the world that are unstable or may not like us." Regarding the effect of agricultural subsidies on rising food prices, Bush said that "Congress is considering a massive, bloated farm bill that would do little to solve the problem. The bill Congress is now considering would fail to eliminate subsidy payments to multi-millionaire farmers", he continued, "this is the right time to reform our nation's farm policies by reducing unnecessary subsidies".

Just a week before this new wave of international controversy began, U.N. Secretary General Ban Ki-moon had commented that several U.N. agencies were conducting a comprehensive review of the policy on biofuels, as the world food price crisis might trigger global instability. He said "We need to be concerned about the possibility of taking land or replacing arable land because of these biofuels", then he added "While I am very much conscious and aware of these problems, at the same time you need to constantly look at having creative sources of energy, including biofuels. Therefore, at this time, just criticising biofuel may not be a good solution. I would urge we need to address these issues in a comprehensive manner." Regarding Jean Ziegler's proposal for a five-year ban, the U.N. Secretary rejected that proposal.

A report released by Oxfam in June 2008 criticized biofuel policies of high-income countries as neither a solution to the climate crisis nor the oil crisis, while contributing to the food price crisis. The report concluded that from all biofuels available in the market, Brazilian sugarcane ethanol is not very effective, but it is the most favorable biofuel in the world in term of cost and greenhouse gas balance. The report discusses some existing problems and potential risks, and asks the Brazilian government for caution to avoid jeopardizing its environmental and social sustainability. The report also says that: "Rich countries spent up to $15 billion last year supporting biofuels while blocking cheaper Brazilian ethanol, which is far less damaging for global food security."

A World Bank research report published in July 2008 found that from June 2002 to June 2008 "biofuels and the related consequences of low grain stocks, large land use shifts, speculative activity and export bans" pushed prices up by 70 percent to 75 percent. The study found that higher oil prices and a weak dollar explain 25–30% of total price rise. The study said that "large increases in biofuels production in the United States and Europe are the main reason behind the steep rise in global food prices" and also stated that "Brazil's sugar-based ethanol did not push food prices appreciably higher". The Renewable Fuels Association (RFA) published a rebuttal based on the version leaked before its formal release. The RFA critique considers that the analysis is highly subjective and that the author "estimates the impact of global food prices from the weak dollar and the direct and indirect effect of high petroleum prices and attributes everything else to biofuels".

An economic assessment by the OECD also published in July 2008 agrees with the World Bank report regarding the negative effects of subsidies and trade restrictions, but found that the impact of biofuels on food prices are much smaller. The OECD study is also critical of the limited reduction of greenhouse gas emissions achieved from biofuels produced in Europe and North America, concluding that the current biofuel support policies would reduce greenhouse gas emissions from transport fuel by no more than 0.8 percent by 2015, while Brazilian ethanol from sugar cane reduces greenhouse gas emissions by at least 80 percent compared to fossil fuels. The assessment calls on governments for more open markets in biofuels and feedstocks in order to improve efficiency and lower costs. The OECD study concluded that "current biofuel support measures alone are estimated to increase average wheat prices by about 5 percent, maize by around 7 percent and vegetable oil by about 19 percent over the next 10 years."

Another World Bank research report published in July 2010 found their previous study may have overestimated the contribution of biofuel production, as the paper concluded that "the effect of biofuels on food prices has not been as large as originally thought, but that the use of commodities by financial investors (the so-called "financialization of commodities") may have been partly responsible for the 2007/08 spike".

== See also ==
- Biodiesel
- Biofuel
- Biofuel advocacy groups
- Bioplastics: impact on food
- Commodity price shocks
- Corn stoves
- Deforestation
- Distillers grains
- Ethanol economy
- Ethanol fuel in Australia
- Ethanol fuel in Brazil
- Ethanol fuel in Sweden
- Ethanol fuel in the Philippines
- Ethanol fuel in the United States
- Food security
- Food vs. feed
- Methanol economy
- Methanol fuel
- Malthusian catastrophe
- Oil depletion
- Vegetable oil economy
- World Agricultural Supply and Demand Estimates (monthly report)
- 2007–2008 world food price crisis

== Bibliography ==
- Congressional Budget Office (April 2009), The Impact of Ethanol Use on Food Prices and Greenhouse-Gas Emissions (PDF), Congress of the United States
- Bruce A. Babcock (June 2011), The Impact of US Biofuel Policies on Agricultural Price Levels and Volatility (PDF), International Centre for Trade and Sustainable Development, archived from the original (PDF) on 10 August 2017
- Goettemoeller, Jeffrey; Adrian Goettemoeller (2007), Sustainable Ethanol: Biofuels, Biorefineries, Cellulosic Biomass, Flex-Fuel Vehicles, and Sustainable Farming for Energy Independence, Prairie Oak Publishing, Maryville, Missouri, ISBN 978-0-9786293-0-4. See Chapter 7. Food, Farming, and Land Use.
- Neves, Marcos Fava; Mairun Junqueira Alves Pinto; Marco Antonio Conejero; Vinicius Gustavo Trombin (2011), Food and Fuel: The Example of Brazil, Wageningen Academic Publishers, ISBN 978-90-8686-166-8
- The Worldwatch Institute (2007), Biofuels for Transport: Global Potential and Implications for Energy and Agriculture, Earthscan Publications Ltd., London, U.K., ISBN 978-1-84407-422-8
