= Food vs. feed =

Competition for resources between growing crops for human consumption and for animal feed

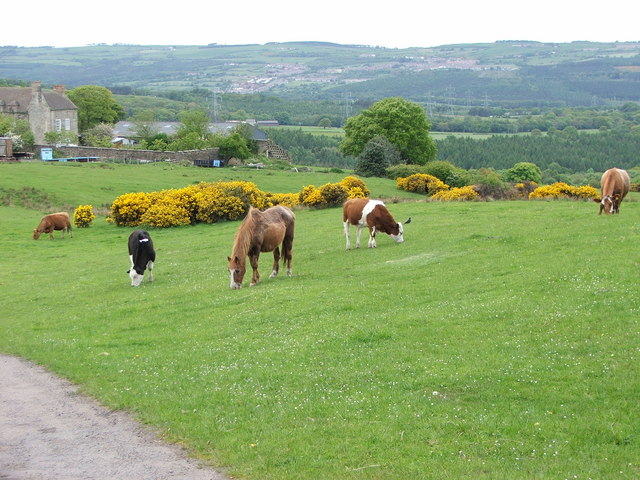
Livestock feeding on land in the United Kingdom

Food vs. feed is the competition for agricultural resources between crops for human consumption and crops for animal feed. In this competition, the resources at stake include land, water, fertilizers, labor, and finances.

The essence of this competition is the division of land. In many countries, livestock graze on land that is typically unsuitable for growing crops for human consumption. According to estimates, there exists three times as much agricultural land as arable land; agricultural land can be used for any agricultural purpose, including grazing, but arable land can be used only for growing crops.

The United Nations Food and Agriculture Organization (FAO) uses the term food vs. feed in the livestock industry; this term is used to compare crop inputs with protein outputs. For a given energetic output, crops for human consumption require fewer resources than do crops for meat and dairy products.

== Global impacts ==
=== Greenhouse gas emissions and trade ===
According to the FAO, global emissions from agriculture are estimated at 5.4 billion metric tons of carbon dioxide equivalent (CO_{2}eq). Since the 1960s, international trade in animal feed and products has increased tenfold, because of increasing demand for meat and dairy products. This increase in demand—driven by population growth and the increasing popularity of animal-based diets—has increased the need for more land devoted to feed production. Moreover, the demand for crops for human consumption has increased with population growth. Global trade in vegetables has increased by a factor of 7.5 since the 1960s. In addition to trade in crops, feeds, and animal products, the transportation of resources involved in crop cultivation—such as crop seeds, processed feed, fertilizers, pesticides, and other materials—contributes to CO_{2} emissions.

== Circular agriculture ==
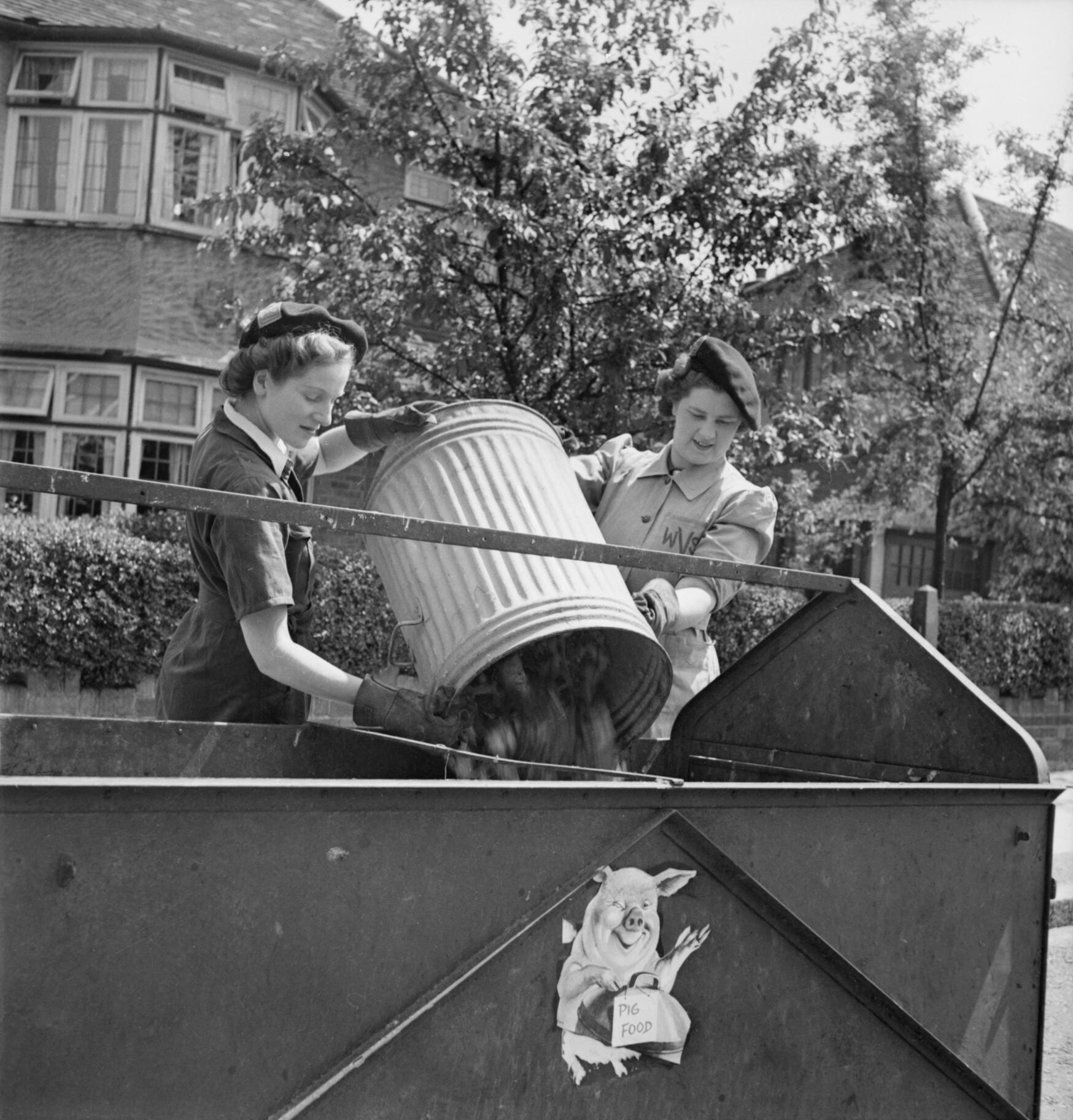
Pig Food—a women's voluntary service collecting kitchen waste to feed pigs, East Barnet, Hertfordshire, England (1943)

Circular agriculture is a sustainable farming system that promotes waste cycling and resource preservation. Farms that exclusively produce food crops or feed generate excess waste that contributes to environmental pollution. In a circular agriculture system, wasted food can be used to feed livestock. The food waste can be redirected as feed, and it can also be composted into fertilizer to enrich the soil. Food waste used as feed reduces greenhouse gas emissions, because the process decreases waste disposal and excessive feed production.

Unharvested crops, crop remnants, and other farm waste in landfills produce methane (CH_{4}), a greenhouse gas that traps more heat than carbon dioxide (CO_{2}) does. According to the Massachusetts Institute of Technology (MIT) Climate Portal, methane traps 120 times more heat than carbon dioxide does at a given moment. Methane is also produced by enteric fermentation (a digestive process) and manure management in livestock operations.

=== China and Beiqiu Farm ===
China produces 708 million metric tons of CO_{2}eq, which accounts for 13.5% of the global contribution and places the country first in agricultural emissions. As a distinct measure, livestock emissions amount to 150 million tons. Because of high demand for both crops and livestock, farms in China have adopted more circular agricultural practices to better meet demand—for example, onsite processing facilities that turn farm waste into feed and fertilizer. Beiqiu Farm, located in Dezhou City in China's Shandong Province, uses a circular agricultural system; in this system, the farm prioritizes both food crops and feed crops for the farm's livestock. Beiqiu Farm produces wheat and corn for food production and livestock feed. Unsold crops are repurposed as feed, and a portion of the harvest is set aside to ensure sufficient feed for livestock. Livestock manure and crop byproducts are repurposed as organic fertilizers through Beiqiu's onsite processing facility, thereby ensuring that no waste is sent to landfills. This process lowers the farm's costs while also reducing its excess greenhouse gas emissions. Feeding livestock with onsite crops reduces emissions by eliminating the need to transport off-farm sources of feed.

== See also ==
- Environmental impact of meat production – Impact of farming animals on the environment
- Agricultural productivity – Quotient between production and productive factors
- Environmental vegetarianism – Type of practice of vegetarianism
- Precision fermentation – Biological manufacturing process
- Economics of veganism – Non-usage of animal products
- Feed conversion ratio – Ratio of animal feed to desired product
- Fish meal – Commercial product made from fish to feed farm animals
- Food security – Measure of food availability
- Food race – American author (1935–2018)
- Food vs. fuel – Debate concerning diversion of food supply for biofuels
- Meat alternative – Plant-based food made to resemble meat
