= Biofuel in the European Union =

Strict sustainability standards for biofuel in the European Union (EU) are set by the European Commissioner on Energy. Biofuels are considered a renewable alternative to fossil fuels in the transportation sector for the EU. The EU has played a large role in increasing the use of biofuels in member states; however, it has also aimed, to some extent, to mitigate the potential negative impacts of biofuel production. Current EU legislation on biofuels includes a goal to increase renewable energy consumption by 20%, eliminate biofuel feedstock sourced from carbon-rich land, accounting for emissions caused from land use change as well as solely biofuel usage, and reducing greenhouse gas intensities from fuels used in transport and machinery.

== Background ==
The European Union (EU) has its own subsidiary body that handles all energy-related issues, called the European Commission on Energy. They define biofuels as "liquid or gaseous transport fuels such as biodiesel and bioethanol which are made from biomass". Chemically, biofuels are alcohols produced by fermenting raw materials from starch and sugars. One of the more prominent biofuels, ethanol, is made up of biomass such as sugarcane and corn. Other sources of biofuel such as biomethane and biofertilizers are produced from unusable straw. The use of these products increases the energy yield per hectare of agricultural land by as much as 50%. Compared to petroleum, this process leads to up to an 80% reduction in carbon dioxide production. Ethanol fuels can be used as a fuel substitute or as an additive in vehicles using combustion engines. If these fuels are used for electricity or heating, they are considered bioliquids. According to the European Commission on Energy, biofuels "emit less CO_{2}, contain no sulphur compounds, and are generally more efficient due to their higher energy density". The goals of the EU are to reduce greenhouse gas emissions and reduce their dependency on other nations for fossil fuels. For this resource to be considered renewable, the EU has strict sustainability standards for the production of and use of biofuels. The three main criteria for biofuels to be sustainable and allowed for use are:

1. Biofuels must achieve greenhouse gas savings of at least 35% versus fossil fuels, which then rises to 50% in 2017, then rises again to 60% in 2018. The rising standards are only for new production plants. (The entire life cycle emissions of the fuel are taken into account in these savings which includes cultivation, processing, and transport.)
2. Biofuels must not be grown in areas that are currently, or were previously, carbon sinks (e.g. wetlands, forests).
3. Raw materials obtained from areas with high biodiversity, such as forests or grasslands, cannot be used to produce biofuels.

To ensure these standards are met by the companies that produce and cultivate biofuels, there are several ways that the EU may verify their compliance. One method is that these companies must participate in voluntary schemes. A scheme is an independent and external group or company that will verify whether a company is following the sustainability criteria for biofuels. The schemes are usually privately run but must be recognized as valid by the European Commission.

The following is a list of approved voluntary schemes:

- ISCC (International Sustainability and Carbon Certification)
- Bonsucro EU
- RTRS EU RED (Round Table on Responsible Soy EU RED)
- RSB EU RED (Roundtable of Sustainable Biofuels EU RED)
- 2BSvs (Biomass Biofuels voluntary scheme)
- Red Tractor (Red Tractor farm Assurance Combinable Crops & Sugar Beet Scheme)
- SQC (Scottish Quality Farm Assured Combinable Crops scheme)
- Red Cert
- HVO Renewable Diesel Scheme for Verification of Compliance with the RED sustainability criteria for biofuels
- Gafta Trade Assurance Scheme
- KZR INIG System
- Trade Assurance Scheme for Combinable Crops
- Universal Feed Assurance Scheme

== Biofuel statistics in the European Union ==
By 2024, the average share of renewable energy in transport across the EU reached 11.2%. Sweden remains the leader in the Union with a 26.4% share, followed by Finland at 20.3%.

Biofuels
		Consumption 2005 (GWh)	Consumption 2006 (GWh)			Consumption 2007 (GWh)		
No	Country	Total	Total	Biodiesel	Bioethanol	Total	Biodiesel	Bioethanol
1	Germany*	21,703	40,417	29,447	3,544	46,552	34,395	3,408
2	France	4,874	8,574	6,855	1,719	16,680	13,506	3,174
3	Austria	920	3,878	3,878	0	4,524	4,270	254
4	Spain	1,583	1,961	629	1,332	4,341	3,031	1,310
5	United Kingdom	793	2,097	1,533	563	4,055	3,148	907
6	Sweden*	1,938	2,587	523	1,894	3,271	1,158	2,113
7	Portugal	2	818	818	0	1,847	1,847	0
8	Italy	2 059	1,732	1,732	0	1,621	1 621	0
9	Bulgaria		96	96	0	1,308	539	769
10	Poland	481	1 102	491	611	1,171	180	991
11	Belgium	0	10	10	0	1,061	1,061	0
12	Greece	32	540	540	0	940	940	0
13	Lithuania	97	226	162	64	612	477	135
14	Luxembourg	7	6	6	0	407	397	10
15	Czech Republic	33	226	213	13	382	380	2
16	Slovenia	58	50	48	2	160	151	9
17	Slovakia	110	153	149	4	154	n.a.	154
18	Hungary	28	139	4	136	107	0	107
19	Netherlands	0	371	172	179	101	n.a.	101
20	Ireland	9	36	8	13	97	27	54
21	Denmark	0	42	0	42	70	0	70
22	Latvia	34	29	17	12	20	0	20
23	Finland	0	10	0	10	n.a.	n.a.	n.a.
24	Romania	–	32	32	0	n.a.	n.a.	n.a.
25	Malta	8	10	10	0	n.a.	n.a.	n.a.
26	Estonia	0	7	7	0	n.a.	n.a.	n.a.
27	Cyprus	0	0	0	0	n.a.	n.a.	n.a.
27	EU	34,796	65,148	47,380	10,138	89,482	67,154	13,563
*Total includes vegetable oils in Germany: 7309 GWh (2006) and 2018 GWh (2005) and biogas in Sweden: 225 GWh (2006) and 160 GWh (2005), n.a. = not available

== European Advanced Biofuels Flightpath ==
The European Commission on Energy has established criteria on the use of biofuels for aviation in the EU. Emissions from the aviation sector of transportation account for 3% of total emissions in the EU. They introduced the "European Advanced Biofuels Flightpath" in 2011, which promotes the increased use of biofuels in the aviation industry. They have also partnered with several airlines (Lufthansa, Air France/KLM, and British Airways) and biofuel producers (Choren Industries, Neste Oils, Biomass Technology Group, and UOP) to achieve the goals set in the Flightpath. The European Advanced Biofuels Flightpath aims to get biofuels to the market faster through the production of more advanced production facilities and to have the aviation industry use 2 million tonnes of biofuels by 2020. The Flightpath also outlines how the commission will achieve its financial goals.. As a part of the Flightpath, the EU also plans to facilitate purchase agreements between aviation companies and biofuel producers.

Rules have been established by the commission to address a problem associated with thepotential indirect land use change that biofuel production may cause, since biofuel production usually takes place on former cropland. Since those crops will still be needed, it is possible that destroying forests or other natural areas may be necessary in order to increase agricultural land, which could potentially negate all emission reductions from the production of biofuels. The EU Commission on Energy introduced several new rules to address indirect land use change in 2015, in the form of amendments on the Renewable Energy Directive and Fuel Quality Directive (Directive 2009/30/EC). These amendments include:

- limiting the share of biofuels from crops grown on agricultural land that can be counted towards the 2020 renewable energy targets to 7%.
- setting an indicative 0.5% target for advanced biofuels as a reference for national targets which will be set by EU countries in 2017.
- harmonising the list of feedstocks for biofuels across the EU whose contribution would count double towards the 2020 target of 10% for renewable energy in transport.
- requiring that biofuels produced in new installations emit at least 60% fewer greenhouse gases than fossil fuels.
- introducing stronger incentives for the use of renewable electricity in transport (by counting it more toward the 2020 target of 10% for renewable energy use in transport).
- enhancing reporting obligations for the fuel providers, EU countries and the European Commission.

As of January 1, 2025, the ReFuelEU Aviation regulation (Regulation (EU) 2023/2405) mandates that aviation fuel suppliers at EU airports must ensure that a minimum of 2% of the fuel supplied is Sustainable Aviation Fuel (SAF). This blending requirement is set to increase to 6% in 2030 and reach 70% by 2050.

== History ==
Germany ranks first in biofuel use in the EU, partly due to the early implementation of such fuel sources. Nicolaus August Otto, a German engineer, was one of the first pioneers in biofuel use. His early prototypes of combustion engines ran on ethanol in the 1860s. Additionally, German inventor and mechanical engineer Rudolf Diesel designed his original diesel engine to run on peanut oil. However, due to the discovery of large supplies of oil in the United States, petroleum prices plummeted and the use of biofuels dropped because of the relative ease and cheaper cost of petroleum fuels. As the oil industry continued to grow, the start of World War II forced Germany to continue research into alternatives for imported fuel due to strained international relations. With the increased pressure for alternative fuel sources, German inventors implemented the use of gasoline along with alcohol derived from potatoes.

During this same period, the United Kingdom, who now ranks fifth in European biofuel use, also explored alternative fuel use as fuel was crucial for the war, becoming the second country to discover the concept of mixing grain alcohol with petrol. However, with the end of the war, interest in biofuels waned. A combination of cheap oil from the Persian Gulf and the Middle East and increased geopolitical peace would lead to fewer advancements in alternative fuel sources.

Between 1973 and 1979 a fuel crisis driven by geopolitical conflict would again revive the need for alternative fuels. The Organization of the Petroleum Exporting Countries (OPEC), made substantial cuts in exports to non-OPEC nations leading to severe increases in oil prices, which prompted Europe to renew its search for biofuels. These rising prices continued into the twentieth century. With the new century came increased environmental consciousness regarding the impact fossil fuels have on the environment. The increase in prices, and interest in sustainability lead to unprecedented innovation in the alternative fuel industry. Thus biofuels such as ethanol are now used all over the world as an alternative fuel in internal combustion engines. While complete substitution is not yet common throughout Europe, countries like Germany have been using E10 fuel (consisting of 10% ethanol) since 2011. E10 fuels have replaced the previous E5 fuel, containing 5% ethanol; although this may seem like a slight increase in ethanol use, this increase reflects a more progressive Europe as improvements are being made based primarily upon environmentally conscious efforts, rather than geopolitical or economic pressures.

== Current legislation ==
In October 2023, the European Union formally adopted Directive (EU) 2023/2413, known as RED III. This legislation raised the binding 2030 target for the share of renewable energy in the EU's gross final consumption to at least 42.5%. For the transport sector, Member States are now required to choose between a binding target of a 14.5% reduction in greenhouse gas intensity or a binding share of at least 29% renewable energy within the sector's final energy consumption by 2030.

Current EU legislation as approved by the European Parliament in 2008 focuses on visions for 2020. Legislative targets involving the use of biofuels are covered to a large extent in the Renewable Energy Directive (RED), which aims to source 10% of energy in transport sectors from renewables by 2020. Further goals include a 20% increase in renewable energy consumption, a 20% increase in energy efficiency, no biofuel feedstock sourced from carbon-rich land, compliance with environment and social sustainability criteria of differing countries exporting fuels as well as reductions in GHG lifecycle emissions of transport fuels by 6%. Targets stated in the Indirect Land Usage Change directive (ILUC) complement the RED act, and relate to biofuel usage in the EU. These targets include accounting for GHG emissions caused from land use change as well as solely biofuel usage, limiting the share of biofuel crops that can be grown on agricultural land as well as a number of reporting/ethical obligations for fuel providers. The Fuel Quality Directive (FQD) was revised in 2011 to act in harmony with these two legislations, introducing laws on greenhouse gas intensities from fuels used in transport and machinery, and reducing them by 6% by 2020. Policy preferences among the national decision-makers in the eleven central and eastern European Member States generally favour meeting around two thirds of transport renewable energy demand with domestically sourced biofuels from biomass, while differing markedly in the criteria and degree of policy intervention they preferred.

=== RED II proposals ===
On 16 January 2018, the European Parliament endorsed proposals for a legislative Renewable Energy Directive II, which aims to aid in reaching goals for the 2030 EU Climate and Energy Framework. Key targets involved in the legislation include:

- a 35% increase in energy efficiency.
- a minimum 35% share of renewable sources in total final energy consumption.
- 14% of renewable energy used in transport.
- a phase-out of palm oil by 2030.

An end to the use of crop-based biofuels by 2030, and the use of biomass for electricity production, was also endorsed by the European Parliament committee by a smaller majority. Currently, the European Parliament committee and the Industry, Research and Energy committee have voted in agreement on this new RED II legislation; however, a full European Parliamentary vote is now needed.

The legislation highlighted in the chart below transposes the requirements of the RED, FQD, or both into the policies of each member country in order to comply with EU regulations. In some countries, double counting is allowed for biofuels made from select materials, such as waste, non-food cellulosic materials, and others. Materials that qualify for double counting differ between countries. Many EU countries have minimum renewable energy source (RES) targets and minimum overall biofuel targets. The countries that do not have any minimum targets are Estonia, Germany, Latvia, and Sweden.

Current legislation and biofuel targets by country (as of 2016)
Country	Legislation	Double Counting	Minimum RES Target in Petrol (2016)	Minimum RES Target in Diesel (2016)	Minimum Overall Biofuel Target (2016)
Austria	Ordinance BGBL.II Nr. 250/2010, Act BGBL.I Nr. 75/2011, Fuels, Act BGBL/II Nr. 398/2012	Yes*	3.4%	6.3%	5.75%
Belgium	Royal decree establishing product standards for biofuels, Law of 17 July 2013	Yes*	4%	6%	-
Bulgaria	Renewable Energy Sources Act (2011), Ordinance of liquid fuel quality (2011)	No	7%	6%	-
Croatia	Energy Act, Act on Energy Activities Regulation, Air Protection Act, Regulation on liquid fuels quality, Act on Biofuels for Transport	Unknown	-	-	5.6%
Cyprus	Act N112 (I)/2013, Law N11 (I)/2013	Yes*	-	-	2.4%
Czech Republic	Act No. 201/2012 Coll. on Air Protection, Act No. 180/2005 Coll. on the promotion of electricity production from renewable energy sources, Government Regulation No. 351/2012 Coll.	No	4.1%	6%	-
Denmark	Executive Order No. 1403 of 15/12/2009, Act No. 468 of 12/06/2009, Act No. 1607 of 22/12/2010, Executive Order No. 1639 of 16/12/2010, Executive Order No. 843 of 07/07/2011, LBK nr. 674 of 21/06/2011, Act No. 1498 of 23/12/2014	Yes*	-	-	5.75%
Estonia	Order No. 452, Amendments to Act No. 153	Unknown	-	-	-
Finland	Act on Biofuels and Bioliquids (393/2013), Act on Promotion of Biofuels in Transport (446/2007), Act on Liquid Fuels Excise Duty (29 December 1994/1472)	Yes*	-	-	10%
France	Ordinance 2011-1105 of 14 Sept. 2011, Decree 2011-1468 of 9 Nov. 2011, Arrêté of 23 Nov. 2011	Yes*	7%	7.7%	-
Germany	BlmSchG, Biokraft-NachV, 10. BlmSchV	No	-	-	-
Greece	Article 1 of L.3851/2010, L.4062/2012 unit C, OG A'70, 316/2010 Decision of the Chemical Supreme Council (OG B' 501/2012)	Yes*	-	7%	-
Hungary	Act CXVII of 2010, Act XXIX of 2011, Government Decree 343/2010 (XII.28), Decree No. 36/2010 (XII.31), Decree No. 30/2011 (VI.28), Decree No. 1/2012 (I.20), Government Decree No. 309/2013 (VIII.16), Decree 53/2014 (XII.13)	Yes*	-	-	4.9%
Ireland	S.I. No. 147/2011, S.I. No. 148/2011, Energy (Biofuel Obligation and Miscellaneous Provisions) Act 2010, S.I. No. 33/2012	Yes*	-	-	6%
Italy	Legislative Decree No. 28 of March 3, 2011, Legislative Decree No. 55 of March 31, 2011, "Destination Italia Law" No. 145 of 23 December 2013, Decreto 10 Ottobre 2014	Yes*	-	-	5.5%
Latvia	The amendments to the Energy Law (22 September 2011), Cabinet Regulation No. 545, Cabinet Regulation No. 772, Cabinet Regulation No. 332	No	-	-	-
Lithuania	Act on Use of Biofuels n. 2-83 (2011), Renewable Energy Law section 7, Decree No. 1-348/D1-1014/3-742	No	5%	7%	-
Luxembourg	Memorial A n°228 du 21.12.2010, Grand Ducal Regulation of 27 February 2011, Amendements gouvernementaux au projet de règlement grand-ducal	Unknown	-	-	5.15%
Malta	Biofuels (Sustainability Criteria) Regulation 2010 (LN552/10), The Promotion of Energy from Renewable Sources Regulations 2010 (LN538/10), Biofuels and Bioliquids Markets Regulations 2012 (LN85/2012), Quality of Fuel Regulations 2008 (LN44/08), Lifecycle Greenhouse Gas Emissions from Fuels Regulations 2010 (LN556/10)	Yes*	-	-	6.5%
The Netherlands	Decree on Renewable Energy in Transport, Regulation No. BJZ2011044006, Law of 24 March 2011, Law of 26 September 2014, Decree on Renewable Energy in Transport 2015, Regulation No. lens/BSK-2014/259021, Regulation No. BJZ2011043268, Decree on Fuel Pollution	Yes*	-	-	7%
Poland	Act No. 984/2013, Act No. 478/2015, Act No. 457/2014, Act No. 151/2015, Act No. 1088/2014	No	-	-	7.1%
Portugal	Decree-Law No. 117/2010 of 25 October 2010, Decree-Law No. 142/2010 of 31 December 2010, Ordinance No. 8/2012 of 4 January 2012, Decree-Law No. 6/2012 of 17 January 2012	Yes*	2.5%	-	7.5%
Romania	Law 139/2010, Decision 935/2011, Decision 918, 2012	Yes*	4.5%	6.5%	-
Slovakia	Act No. 136/2011, Decree No. 271/2011, Act No. 309/2009	Yes*	4.6%	6.9%	5.5%
Slovenia	Regulation 38/2012, Regulation 74/2011	Unknown	-	-	7.5%
Spain	Sustainable Economy Law 2/2011 of 4 March, Royal Decree 1597/2011 of 4 November, Royal Decree 1088/2010	Yes*	-	-	4.3%
Sweden	The law Lag (2010:598), The Fuel Regulation of 1 May 2011	No	-	-	-
United Kingdom	Promotion of the Use of Energy from Renewable Sources Regulations 2011 No. 243, Renewables Obligation (amendment) Order 2011 No. 984, RTFO (Amendment) Order 2013 No. 816, Motor Fuel (Road Vehicle and Mobile Machinery) Greenhouse Gas Emissions Reporting Regulations 2012 No. 3030	Yes*	-	-	4.75%

*For select materials

=== Criticisms in legislation ===
There is a general awareness that the current EU policy has led to the increased use of conventional biofuels, coming from feedstock and food crops, which in effect compromises agricultural space. The current EU legislation has therefore been criticized for accentuating the negative side effects that follow an increase in first generation biofuel consumption while failing to successfully address these issues. In Tanzania for example, Dutch company BioShape compromised the land and deprived four communities of living space, in order to supply green energy to Dutch and Belgian markets. Operations at the far end of supply chains of, such European biofuel producers, have also been shown to engage in abusive practices of local communities. In Sumatra, Indonesia, a supply company of Wilmar International obtained concessions of large amounts of land originally put aside by the government for community use, and violently prevented community access to it, in attempts to maximize profits.

The adoption of non-land based feedstock or ''advanced biofuels'' derived from wastes and bacteria has proven to be a more sustainable solution than conventional biofuels. However, proposals of the revised RED II target to phase out conventional biofuels has received many criticisms; "miraculously relying on a successful transition to advanced biofuels" has not been backed by science or logic, according to former Irish minister for the environment, Dick Roche. The infrastructure and technologies are not yet established to be able to perform such processes efficiently, and sudden removal of biofuels could lead to drastic pressure and overuse of other fuel sources. Criticisms from organisations such as Oxfam and WWF Europe also revolve around cutting the use of palm oil in biofuels and the side effects on these industries. Arguments include ruining livelihoods of those who rely on palm oil industries for survival in countries such as Indonesia and Malaysia, as well as allowing other powers like China to dominate and increase palm oil imports to compensate.

Recent legislation has also been criticised for hindering the ability of member states to reach the post-Paris sustainable development goals (SDGs). The 70,000 km^{2} of agricultural land used to produce biofuels in Europe in 2008 could have been used to feed 127 million people for a year, contributing to the 'end hunger and poverty' SDG. "Policies that subsidize or mandate food-based biofuel production or consumption drive up food prices and multiply price shocks in agricultural markets". Furthermore, on average, food-based crops emit more than 50% more greenhouse gasses than fossil fuels, resulting in an increase in transport emissions in 2020 rather than a decrease.

== Debates regarding the use of biofuels ==
The debate within the EU surrounding biofuels ‘"has long been seen as a battle between politicians intent on finding a viable alternative to fossil fuels and campaign groups that claim the creation of biofuels creates potential environmental damage, cuts into food production, and may be of limited effect in tackling climate change." The 2009 RED committed the EU to generating 20% of its energy mix from renewable sources, while capping the share of biofuels used in the transport sector at 7%. This Directive intended to compromise between the two sides of the argument surrounding the use of biofuels. "Analysts have said that biofuel seemed an ideal solution for the EU a couple years ago. But the longer-term impact on food prices, deforestation and environment prompted a rethink". The most prominent aspects of this ''rethink'' are the economic opportunity of biofuel usage and green energy, the potential effect on food prices and availability using biofuel may have, and the degree to which biofuel use could benefit the environment.

The EU has been debating whether it should increase its lowering emissions target to above 20% by 2020. There is a divide in the EU between "those who see climate-change policy as detrimental to growth and those seeing it as beneficial to growth". Many member states have also been internally divided by their ministries in this regard. Step-up negotiations have formed a pattern where EU states attempt to reach a decision by an external event, and this is quickly rejected by a coalition led by Poland, including Italy and some new member states. But member states cannot always be treated as unified actors, because in several instances, the positions of various ministries from the same government diverged. Debates in the EU about whether or not green technologies are economically beneficial affect the way in which biofuels are seen. The support for biofuels comes from the side of the EU which considers green technology to be economically beneficial. However, biofuels are more controversial than some other renewable technologies, like wind power or solar power.

There are potential economic benefits to the use of biofuels, as they are said to be the cheapest potential sources of fuel available in the world. Additionally, "the production of crop-based biofuels in Europe generates at least 6.6 billion euros in direct revenue for farmers per year". But, "'beside Europe's changing regulatory structure, farmers and ethanol producers are concerned by the potential for unfair competition from South America once the EU closes its trade deal with the continent's Mercosur trade bloc." Brazil is a prominent member of Mercosur, and is pushing for the EU to accept large quotas for ethanol imports. This would threaten the economic benefits that farmers in the EU would stand to gain from biofuel consumption. Martin Merrild, the outgoing president of the Association of European Farmers' Unions (COPA) believes "any such deal would expose EU farmers to unacceptable and unfair competition". "Free trade is very important for farmers", Merrild said, "but we cannot accept double standards. There will never be fair competition between the EU and Latin America as they do not produce under the same conditions or meet the same standards".

Biofuels are carbon neutral, renewable, recyclable, and a cleaner energy source than fossil fuels. Another advantage to biofuel use is sovereignty, which is especially relevant to the EU. The materials needed for producing biofuels are widely available all around the world so communities and countries can potentially rely on their own resources. This marks a change from fossil fuels which are only available in certain areas of the world, so nations relying on this energy are dependent upon foreign energy. Moving away from fossil fuels would mean the EU could be more self-reliant when it comes to energy sources, and emissions from transporting fuel could be reduced too.

Biofuels are also increasing greenhouse gas emissions through a phenomenon known as indirect land use change, as biofuels displace food production and farmers are forced to reclaim land from carbon-rich ecosystems such as forests and peatlands. Old growth trees act as carbon sinks, when farmers clear those forests this releases the carbon that was locked up in those large trees. But not all biofuels are equal in their impact. Second-generation biofuels do not displace food production or cause more greenhouse gas emissions. To address this issue, in November 2016, the EU revised its renewable energy directive, which now calls for a complete ban on first-generation biofuels. Fuels made from oils such as palm oil and soy oil are being especially targeted. The revised Renewable Energy Directive covers the period 2021 to 2030, and also "calls for a further increase in the share of renewable energy in the EU's mix to at least 27% by 2030". At the same time, it aims to cut the use of crop-based biofuels to 3.8% of transport fuel and shift the market towards' secondary biofuel sources. There are also debates around converting land from food to biofuels, which could drive up food prices and threaten food security. With current population growth and water shortages this could be very dangerous.

== See also ==
- List of renewable energy topics by country
- Biofuels by region
