= Directive 2003/30/EC =

EU directive promoting biofuel usage

- European Union directive
- Title: Directive 2003/30/EC of the European Parliament and of the Council of 8 May 2003 on the promotion of the use of biofuels or other renewable fuels for transport
- Made by: European Parliament & Council
- Journal reference: L123, 17 June 2003, pp. 42–46

Other legislation
- Replaced by: Directive 2009/28/EC

Directive 2003/30/EC was a European Union directive promoting the use of biofuels for EU transport. The directive entered into force in May 2003, and stipulated that national measures must be taken by countries across the EU aiming at replacing 5.75% of all transport fossil fuels (petrol and diesel) with biofuels by 2010. The directive also called for an intermediate target of 2% by 31 December 2005. The target of 5.75% was to be met by 31 December 2010. These percentages were to be calculated on the basis of energy content of the fuel and were to apply to petrol and diesel fuel for transport purposes placed on the markets of member states. Member states were encouraged to take on national "indicative" targets in conformity with the overall target.

Directive 2003/30/EC was repealed by Directive 2009/28/EC.

== Results ==
A 2007 progress report found that biofuel only held a 1% share, not reaching the target of 2% or the combined goals of the member nations, which was 1.4%. The 2010 target was officially replaced when the Directive 2003/30/EC was repealed by Directive 2009/28/EC which contained a target of 10% by 2020.

== Petroleum industry accused of undermining ==
On 2008-04-29, Friends of the Earth Europe (FoEE) released a report stating that oil companies are falsely claiming that the target proposed by the European Commission in revisions to the Fuel Quality Directive is unachievable. The report specifically cited that it is viable for these companies to cut greenhouse gas emissions by at least 10.5% to a maximum of 15.5% through the reduction of gas flaring and venting as well as energy efficiency and refinery improvements. On the issue of the financial constraints, the report cited the $125 billion record profit that oil companies collectively announced in 2007. "Despite their sky-high profits oil companies are not willing to bear the costs of reducing emissions. It seems that since these investments are not profitable, companies will not make them unless they are forced by a regulatory body," the report said.

== Criticism ==
On 14 January 2008 the EU Environment Commissioner Stavros Dimas announced the EU is rethinking its biofuel program due to environmental and social concerns and new guidelines must ensure that EU targets are not damaging. The EU official was particularly concerned about the impact of biofuels on rising food prices, rainforest destruction, notably from palm oil production and concern for rich firms driving poor people off their land to convert it to fuel crops. On 18 January 2008 the UK House of Commons Environmental Audit Committee raised similar concerns, and called for a moratorium on biofuel targets. This position echoes the stance of many non-governmental organisations and environmentalists.

One of the EU responses involved the introduction of the sustainability criteria in the biofuel program. This include key provisions that address the issue of rainforest destruction and unsustainable land conversion. These mandate that biofuels and bioliquid:

- cannot be produced in areas of high biodiversity;
- cannot be produced in untouched forests, protected areas and highly biodiverse savannahs (grasslands); and
- cannot be sourced from areas with high carbon stocks, including wetlands and continuous forests.

The European Parliament has also approved a more lenient policy revising its target for 2015. Although the 10% objective for 2020 was retained, the directive set an interim target of 5% for 2015.

== See also ==
- EU law
- Bioenergy
- Food vs fuel
- Renewable Transport Fuel Obligation (UK implementation)
- Energy policy of the European Union
- Phase-out of fossil fuels
