= Energy efficiency in agriculture =

Energy efficiency in agriculture refers to reducing the amount of energy required to provide agricultural products and services. The European Commission has policies related to energy efficiency, including in agriculture. The European Union has established measures to promote energy efficiency, including setting targets for energy savings, and requiring energy audits and management plans for large companies. The AGREE project conducted studies on energy efficiency in different agricultural production systems and proposed measures for improvement. The results of the project were summarized in reports that highlighted the opportunities and drawbacks for energy efficiency in agriculture in different European countries. Improving energy efficiency in agriculture contributes to reducing greenhouse gas emissions.

== European Commission definitions ==
=== Energy in general ===
European Commission definitions of energy efficiency, are given below:

- Energy efficiency — a ratio between an output of performance, service, goods or energy, and an input of energy;
- Energy efficiency improvement — an increase in energy end-use efficiency as a result of technological, behavioural and/or economic changes;
- Energy savings — an amount of saved energy determined by measuring and/or estimating consumption before and after implementation of one or more energy efficiency improvement measures, whilst ensuring normalization for external conditions that affect energy consumption;

According to article 2(d) of the Regulation (EC) No1099/2008 on energy statistics:

- Energy — means all forms of energy products (combustible fuels, heat, renewable energy, electricity, or any other form of energy)
- Primary energy consumption — means gross inland consumption, excluding non-energy uses
- Final energy consumption — means all energy supplied to industry, transport, households, services and agriculture. It excludes deliveries to the energy transformation sector and the energy industries themselves.

=== Energy in agriculture ===
- Primary energy consumption (PEC) in agriculture is the energy consumed in an agricultural production system (within the farm limits) including the energy for the production of all indirect inputs.
- Energy efficiency in agriculture improvement is defined as the decrease of primary energy consumption for the production of a unit of agricultural product (expressed in weight or volume units), within the farm boundaries.

== European Union policies ==
European Commission requirements regarding energy use across the EU (Directive 2012/27/EU) establish a common framework of measures for the promotion of energy efficiency within the European Union to:

- Ensure the achievement of the Union's 2020 20% headline target on energy efficiency
- Pave the way for further energy efficiency improvements beyond that date

The directive also:

- Lays down rules designed to remove barriers in the energy market and overcome market failures that impede efficiency in the supply and use of energy.

Provides for the establishment of indicative national energy efficiency targets for 2020Key measures with implications for the agricultural sector:

- Energy companies are requested to reduce energy sales by 1.5% every year among their customers. This can be achieved via improved heating systems, fitting double-glazed windows or insulating roofs. Measures to achieve higher energy efficiency should be applied in agricultural buildings too (e.g. greenhouses, animal housing, etc.).
- The public sector is required to renovate 3% of buildings "owned and occupied" by the central government in each country. Buildings need to have a useful area larger than 500 m2 in order to be covered by this requirement (lowered to 250 m2 as of July 2015). In many EU member states there are public sector (general government or regional or municipal) agricultural buildings (e.g. in some countries for agricultural product storage) that could be included in the measures taken by the national government.
- EU countries are requested to draw up a roadmap to make the entire buildings sector more energy efficient by 2050 (commercial, public and private households included). Making farm buildings more energy efficient contributes to this aim. Measures regarding existing agricultural buildings should be carried out and new legislation regarding new installations need to be adopted in the direction of improving their energy efficiency.
- Energy audits and management plans are required for large companies, with cost-benefit analyses for the deployment of combined heat and power generation (CHP) and public procurement. This has implications for large farm companies and large farmers associations and their buildings, storage rooms and greenhouses.
- Each country has to present national indicative targets by April 2013. If the European Commission estimates that those are insufficient to meet the EU's overall 2020 goal, then it can request member states to re-assess their plans.
- In the first semester of 2014, the commission will review the progress towards the 20% energy-efficiency target, report on it and assess whether further measures are needed.
- If Europe is off track, the Commission intends to come back with a proposal for further legislation. Including agricultural activities in the general planning of each member state would help in covering the targets and avoid re-assessing on behalf of the European Commission. This comment applies to the last 3 remarks of the Directive.

== Recent developments and trends ==
In the framework of the AGREE project [3], studies on the energy efficiency of specific agricultural production systems of different types (arable crops, agro-forest, greenhouses, and animal husbandry) were executed in 2012–13 in Europe based on existing data from six countries and were combined in one report.

Energy efficiency measures were proposed for each agricultural system and presented in an overview report. A synthesis and summary report on drivers and stakeholders of energy efficiency in agriculture, and potential of energy saving hours was produced.

The most directly effective measures were taken into account in reporting their effect on energy consumption per unit of product in certain case studies in all seven countries taking into account trade-offs regarding GHG emissions and final farm cost. The results are presented in a report named Economic and environmental analysis of energy efficiency measures in agriculture – Case Studies and trade-offs.

An intensive stakeholder process, by organising national stakeholders meetings in six countries, revealed the opportunities and drawbacks for a future energy efficient agriculture in Europe. The results of this process are presented for six countries at special reports, one for each country (Finland, Germany, Greece, Netherlands, Poland, Portugal). The results of all reports are summarized in a synthesis report on transnational value of national stakeholders meetings.

The integration of the perspectives of representatives of different EU regions to achieve a future energy efficient agriculture in Europe, an output of a European transnational stakeholder meeting, is summarized in the Agenda for transnational collaboration. This represents the shared views on how to improve energy efficiency in European agriculture.

== 2013 perspective ==
According to the work done in AGREE, suggestions were given on the definition of energy efficiency in agriculture

- Energy efficiency is the goal of efforts to reduce the amount of energy required to provide products and services. The general term "energy efficiency in agriculture" reflects changes in technology, government policies, weather patterns, and farming management practices.
- There is not a single measure to describe, ensure, and improve energy efficiency in agriculture. Instead, in the energy balance for a given production process, different indicators may serve and support energy efficiency analysis.
- The AGREE results are based on the specific input of primary energy per cultivation area (GJ/ha) and on the specific input of primary energy per tonne of agricultural product (GJ/t). All measures that are suitable to reduce the specific energy input per unit of product improve energy efficiency (energy efficiency improvement measures).
- Improving energy efficiency of agricultural production contributes directly to the reduction of greenhouse gas (GHG) emissions.
