= American Biofuels Now =

American Biofuels Now is a coalition of biofuels producers, feedstock growers, suppliers, trade groups, environmental organizations, academics and energy users.

Coalition members share the desire for smart, comprehensive policies to support the development of American biofuels.

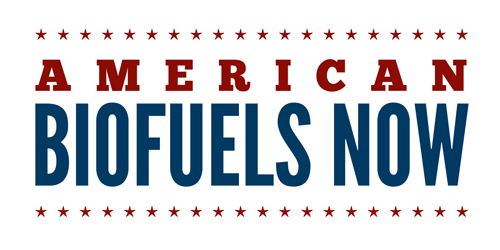
American Biofuels Now logo

== Views ==
America Biofuels Now seeks a homegrown solution to reduce America's dependence on foreign oil, although the US now exports more oil than it imports. They advocate for expansion of biofuels by letting the market pick winners and losers.

They claim that energy can be sustainably grown or recycled from waste into biofuels compatible with existing pipelines or shipped with biofuel-compatible engines.

They emphasize local economic benefits resulting from biofuels production facilities, such as:

- One 49 MGY cellulosic ethanol plant generates about 194 jobs and $105.5 million annually in the first phase of operation
- A 110 MGY Biodiesel plant adds $117 million to the local economy and creates 635 new jobs in all sectors of the economy.
- Biofuels plants generate tax revenues and jobs in the feedstock supply chain, which represents income for farmers, baling operators and transportation.
