= Agriculture in Colombia =

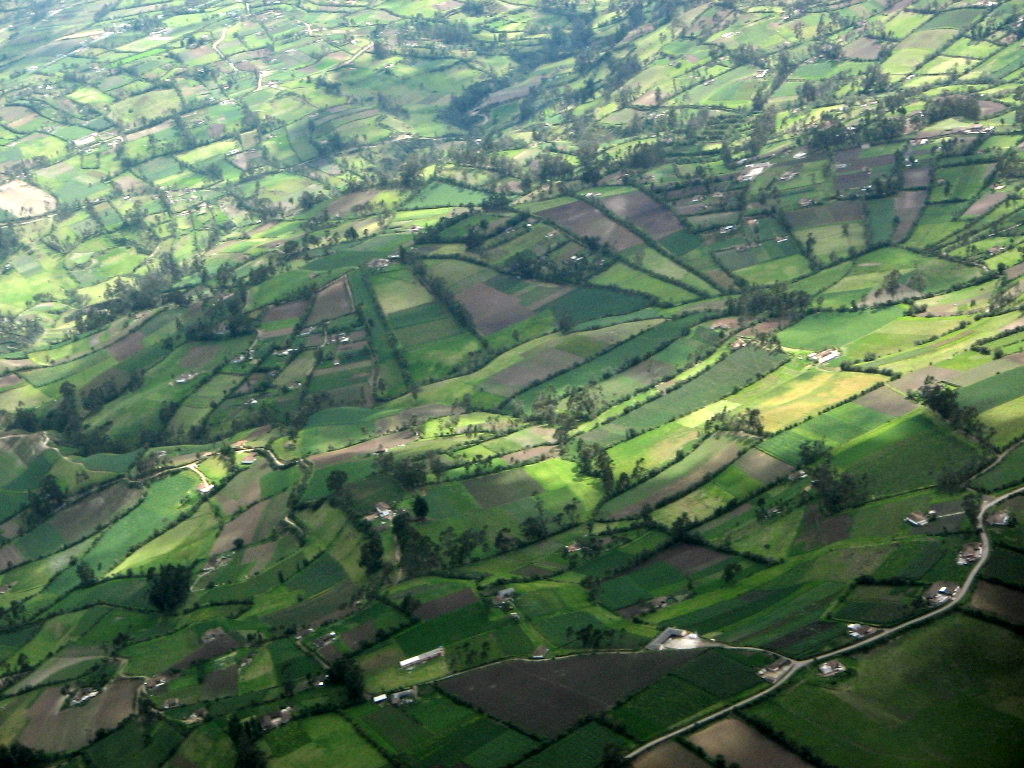
Aerial photo of agricultural land near Ipiales

Agriculture in Colombia refers to all agricultural activities, essential to food, feed, and fiber production, including all techniques for raising and processing livestock within the Republic of Colombia. Plant cultivation and livestock production have continuously abandoned subsistence agricultural practices in favour of technological farming resulting in cash crops which contribute to the economy of Colombia. The Colombian agricultural production has significant gaps in domestic and/or international human and animal sustenance needs.

The primary agricultural products of Colombia are coffee (the country is the fourth-largest producer of coffee in the world), cut flowers, bananas, rice, tobacco, corn, sugarcane, cocoa beans, oilseed, vegetables, fique, panela, forest products; and shrimp. In Colombia, the agricultural politics and policies are determined by the Ministry of Agriculture and Rural Development.

The share of agriculture in Colombia's gross domestic product (GDP) has fallen consistently since 1945, as industry and services have expanded. However, Colombia's agricultural share of GDP decreased during the 1990s by less than in many of the world's countries at a similar level of development, even though the share of coffee in GDP diminished in a dramatic way. Agriculture has nevertheless remained an important source of employment, providing a fifth of Colombia's jobs.

== History of agriculture in Colombia ==
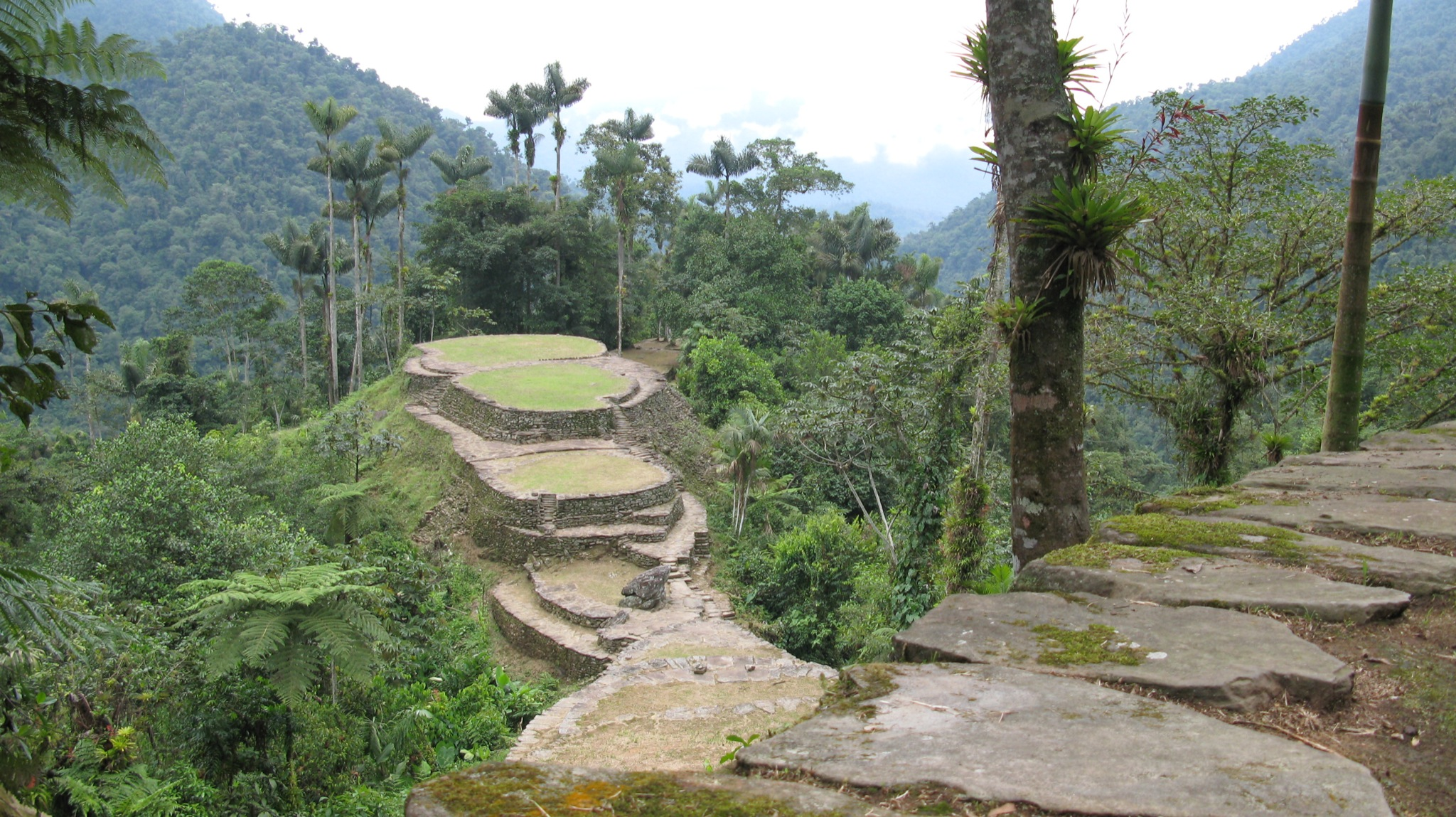
Remnants in Ciudad Perdida. The Tairona Culture had developed agricultural techniques in terraces prior to the arrival of the Spaniards.

=== Pre-Columbian agriculture ===
Indigenous peoples in Colombia were the first to process plants and animals to produce food. The indigenous peoples had developed techniques to plant numerous plants for food and to produce houses and ornaments. Predominantly the indigenous people cultivated maize and managed the Colombian climate and geography to develop planting technique using terraces. Many other plants were first cultivated in Colombia such as tomatoes, avocados, guavas, chilli peppers, manioc and prickly pear were all cultivated as additional food resources, while rubber trees and cotton plants were useful for making cultural products like latex balls and clothing.

The indigenous people also were avid hunters and consumed processed local fauna, predominantly deer, rabbits, snails, fish and birds. The indigenous also cultivated grass to use as roofs for their houses, and fique fiber to sew their clothing and artifacts. They also cultivated coca and marijuana for ceremonial purposes and local fruits and vegetables like yuca and potato for their diet.

=== Spanish conquest and colonization ===
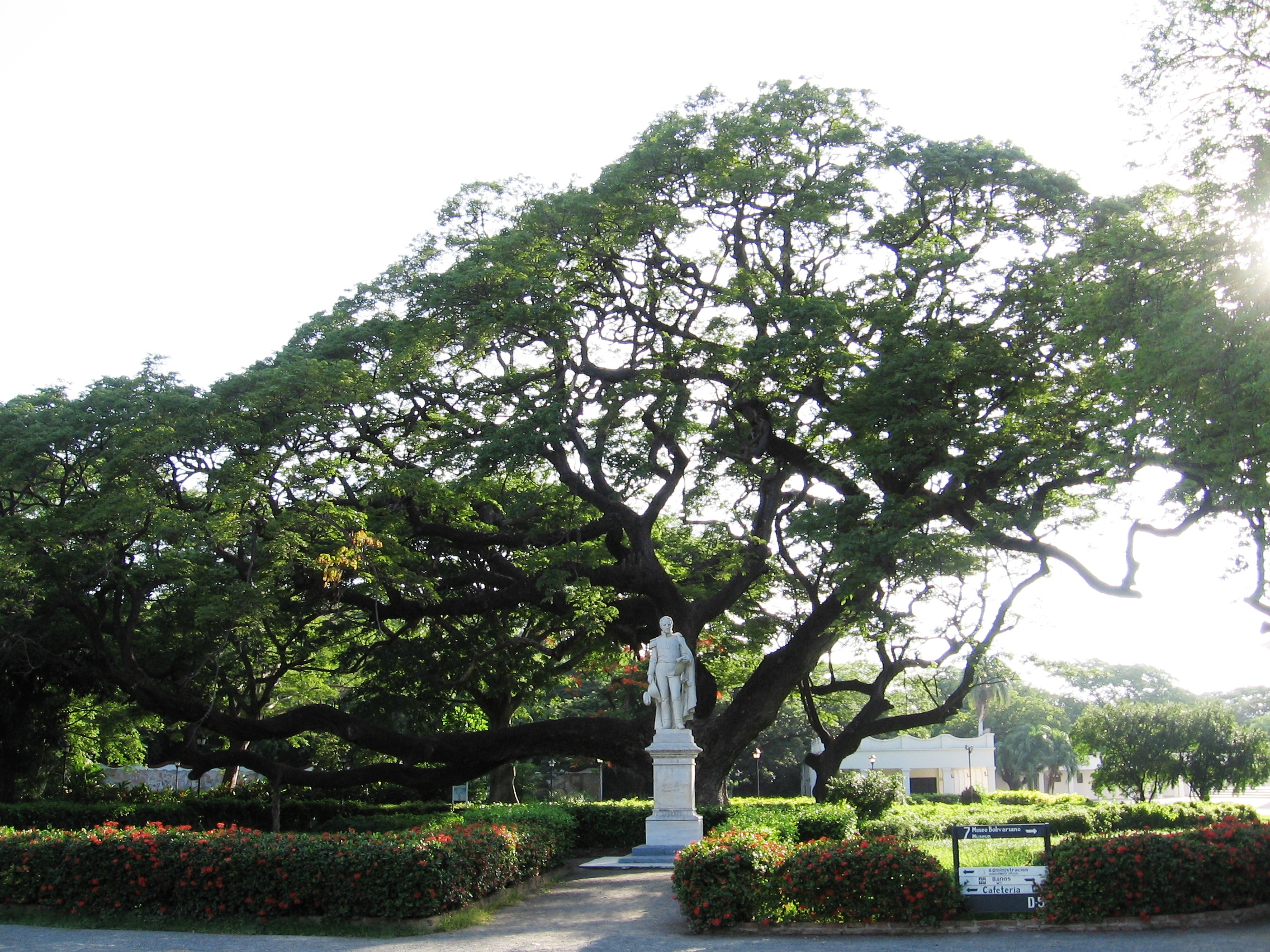
The Quinta de San Pedro Alejandrino was one of the large Haciendas, founded in the 1600s prevailed past the death of Simon Bolivar for whom it was then turned into a museum-like site in the 1900s.

With the arrival of the Spaniards most of the indigenous peoples plantations were used for the consumption of the Spaniards. The Spaniards then turned to violence, domination and submission of the indigenous peoples, forcing most of them into slavery based in systems like the encomiendas. The indigenous peoples were also forced to work under the Mita in the 16th century by the Spaniards and many illnesses brought by the Spaniards combined with the forced workload eliminated or greatly diminished the indigenous population in most of the country. The Spanish introduced a variety of European animal and plant species in Colombia intended for the production and later commercialization back to Spain, as the Spanish monarchy had adopted a mercantilist style of commerce. The Spaniards brought new livestock such as horses, cattle, goats, birds, most of these intended for the human consumption and for commerce. It also introduced agricultural plants such as cotton, coffee, sugar cane, tobacco, tea, sorghum, wheat, with the same purpose of supplying Spain solely.

During the Early 17th Century the Meztizaje (mixing of races) forced the Spaniards to adopt a prohibition of forced labor for indigenous peoples created new forms of contracting workers. The land acquired more importance as the Spaniards realized the productivity and commercial advantage of these and they also introduced private property, to own and commercialize land. During the 17th, 18th and 19th Centuries the Spaniards changed to latifundios (haciendas like Quinta de San Pedro Alejandrino) and minifundios.

The latifundios were great extensions of land owned by a single or very few owners and workers lived in the hacienda solely for the production of food, while the minifundios were small pieces of land owned by peasants mestizos which overused it and unfertilized these. The indigenous population was forced out from the rural areas and into the urban villages.

=== Independence ===
After the independence the criollos in Colombia received the support of the United States and other countries to begin trading as a free nation with other countries under the principles of liberal capitalism, the nation however, struggled socially and politically engulfing in numerous civil wars throughout the 19th Century, leaving the countryside and the agricultural production at the same level the Spanish colonial rule had left it.

Starting from 1821, Columbia implemented a large-scale land reform, the oldest program of this kind in Latin America. Since the beginning of the 20th century, the country transferred 23 million hectares of land, mostly benefitting poor peasants and people without land. However, between 1960 and 2010, land reforms were affected by equity issues and elite capture of land. In areas with typically small and medium size farms, the land distribution reduced inequalities in ownership. However, in areas where members of a rural elite already owned much of the land, the new plots were also diverted into the large farms.

== Agricultural policy ==
The most relevant policy instrument affecting the recent evolution of the agricultural sector has been the price bands that Andean countries introduced to protect agriculture in the context of the trade-liberalization program of the early 1990s. According to the mechanism, when international prices decrease, import tariffs increase and vice versa. These price-band ranges remain, despite domestic controversy regarding the level of protection that they provide. This is mainly because of pressure from interest groups and because of the difficulties in identifying clearly the impact on international prices of the subsidies and internal supports given to producers in the developed world.

Public policy toward the agricultural sector also has included the establishment of subsidized sources of credit. Since 1990 such mechanisms have included the Fund for the Finance of the Agricultural Sector (Finagro). Other policy instruments have included minimum price guarantees, import quotas, subsidized credits and tax exemptions, campaigns to promote consumption, incentives for new investments and for forestry plantations, and more recent exchange-rate or currency-hedging options.

== Production ==
Colombia is one of the 5 largest producers in the world of coffee, avocado and palm oil, and one of the 10 largest producers in the world of sugarcane, banana, pineapple and cocoa.

Colombia produced, in 2018, 36.2 million tons of sugarcane (7th largest producer in the world), 5.8 million tons of palm oil (5th largest producer in the world), 3.7 million tons of banana and 3,5 million tons of plantain (4th largest producer of banana in the world) and 720 thousand tons of coffee (4th largest producer in the world, behind Brazil, Vietnam and Indonesia). Although its neighbor Brazil is the largest producer of coffee in the world (3.5 million tons produced in the same year), the advertising carried out by the country for decades suggests that Colombian coffee is of higher quality, which generates greater added value to the country's product. In the same year, Colombia produced 3.3 million tons of rice, 3.1 million tons of potato, 2.2 million tons of cassava, 1.3 million tons of maize, 900 thousand tons of pineapple, 670 thousand tons of onion, 527 thousand tons of tomato, 419 thousand tons of yam, 338 thousand tons of mango, 326 thousand tons of avocado, in addition to smaller productions of other agricultural products such as orange, tangerine, lemon, papaya, beans, carrot, coconut, watermelon etc.

== Agricultural products ==
In 2006 Colombia's most important agricultural products were cattle, accounting for 45 percent of agricultural output; coffee, 9.5 percent; fruits, 15.2 percent (including plantains, 5.2 percent; and bananas, 2.8 percent); rice, 4.9 percent; flowers, 4.2 percent; vegetables, 4.1 percent; and other agricultural products, 17.1 percent. This composition has remained basically the same since 1992, except for an increase in the share of cattle and fruits, and a decrease in the share of coffee.

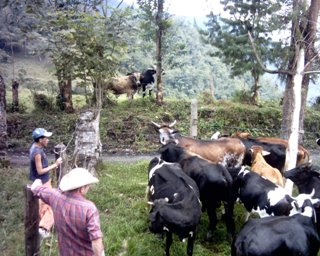
Cattle-ranching in Macanal

=== Cattle ===
Cattle raising is the most widespread agricultural activity in Colombia, accounting for 74 percent of Colombia's agricultural land in 2005.

Nevertheless, cattle traditionally were not a particularly important or consistent net export for Colombia, and coffee's dominance within the country's agricultural exports remains largely unchallenged, although cattle is needed for milk.

Perhaps the most significant sectoral change in modern times was the creation of the National Livestock Fund (Federación Nacional de Ganaderos, or Fedegán) in 1993, administered by the Association of Colombian Stockbreeders (Federación Nacional de Ganaderos, or Fedegan). That fund has generated resources to tackle five major issues: sanitation, commercialization, research and development (R&D), training, and promotion of consumption. Although progress has been made on all five fronts, perhaps the most remarkable achievements have occurred in sanitation. A national program of vaccination against foot-and-mouth disease began in 1997. In 2009 the World Organisation for Animal Health declared the country free of foot-and-mouth disease by vaccination. Significant progress also has been made in vaccination for brucellosis. These sanitation achievements are of major importance in increasing market access for Colombia's cattle exports.

=== Coffee ===
Coffee historically has been a major factor in the Colombian economy. Although Brazil became the dominant force in coffee production and trade when the crop was introduced to South America in the eighteenth century, the uniquely rich flavor of the coffee from Colombia's newly cultivated highland regions led to its becoming a major Colombian export in the late nineteenth century. By the 1920s, coffee made up 70 percent of total exports.

At its outset, the production of coffee held much promise for the nation's economy. It incentivized the development of infrastructure, fueling the construction of roads connecting areas of cultivation to the distant coasts, as well as a railway system. The United States quickly became the primary consumer of Colombian coffee. Furthermore, the cultivation of coffee on smaller-scale farms allowed for the growth of a robust middle class composed largely of local producers. However, the rise of larger multinational corporations such as the United Fruit Company in the twentieth century proved difficult to compete with.

Since the middle of the twentieth century, however, its relative importance has been decreasing, largely as a natural outcome of the country's development process. The increase in the share of the services sector, as the nation has developed, corresponded to the reduction of coffee in both GDP and exports. Whereas in 1985 coffee exports represented 51 percent of total exports in value terms, they represented less than 6 percent in 2006. However, the relative decline in coffee's share of both GDP and exports should not imply that coffee has ceased to be a determining factor both in economic and social terms. The livelihoods of an estimated 566,000 families, some 2.3 million Colombians, depend entirely on coffee.

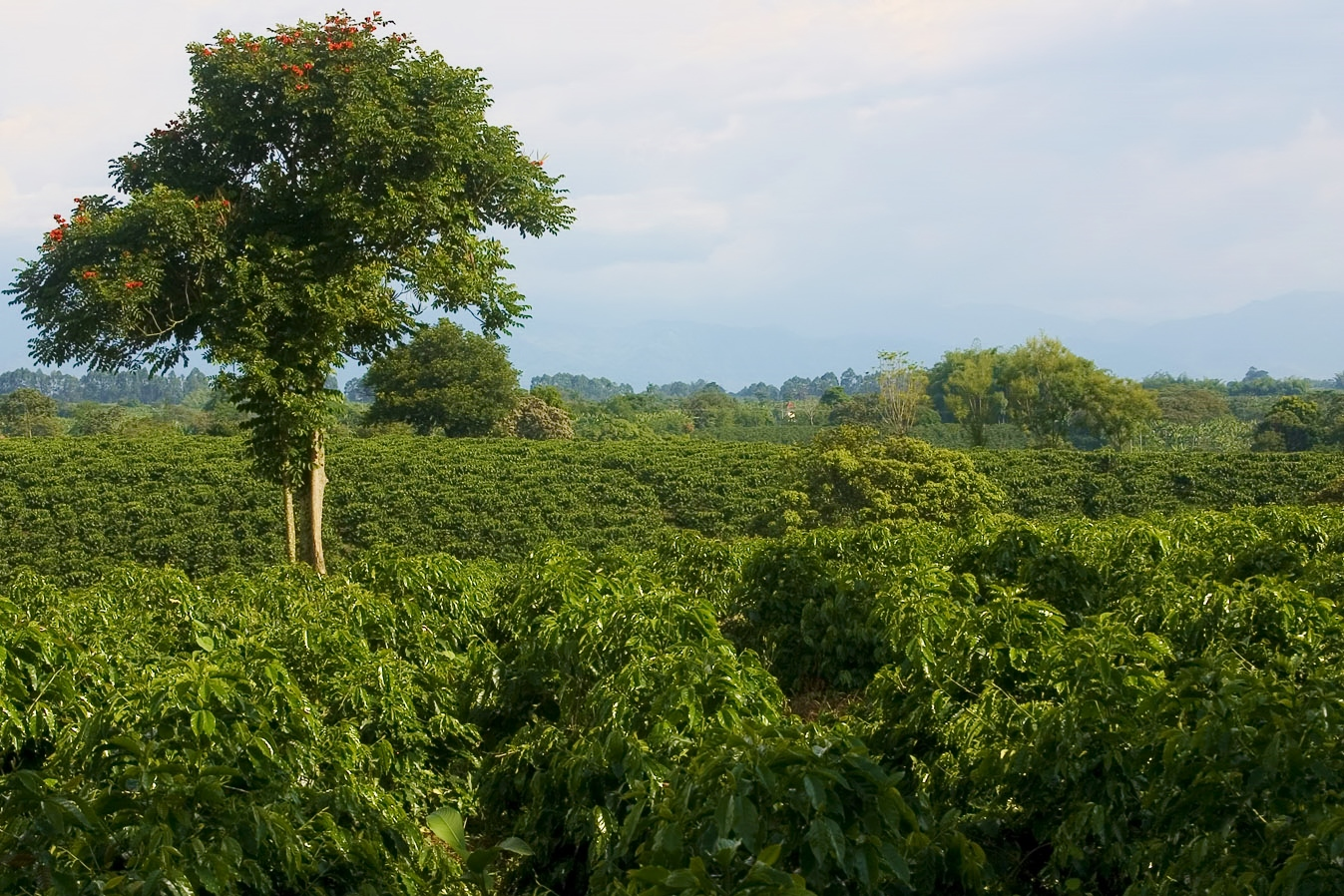
Coffee plantation in Quimbaya

The two most important increases in coffee's international price per pound since 1821 occurred after the signing of the Inter-American Coffee Agreement of 1940 and the International Coffee Agreement of 1963. Such real price peaks occurred in 1954 and 1978, inducing increased production, enhancing inventories, and leading eventually to lower real coffee prices.

In 2003 coffee registered a price of US$0.60 per pound, its lowest price since 1821, because of the collapse of the International Coffee Agreement of 1989, the expansion of production in Vietnam, and the reallocation of production in Brazil toward the northern milder areas. Moreover, between 1999 and 2002 Colombia shifted from being the second-largest to the third-largest producer of coffee in the world, behind Brazil and Vietnam.

These developments in international markets mean that since 2002 Colombia has restructured the institutional management of coffee. There have been significant changes at the National Federation of Coffee Growers (Fedecafé), one of the country's most traditional and important business organizations, which is owned and controlled by 500,000 farmers who cultivate coffee on small farms. Before 2002 Fedecafé had a large and diverse investment portfolio in shipping, airlines, and the financial sector. Since the reforms, Fedecafé has pursued three objectives: commercialization and output-purchase guarantees; stabilization of coffee growers' income; and advancement of coffee institutions by funding R&D, improving the coffee growers' managerial skills, safeguarding Colombian coffee brands in international markets, and developing special coffees. Fedecafé launched the Juan Valdez coffee shops in Bogotá in 2002 and in the United States in 2004. By 2008 it had more than 70 stores, including at least 60 in Colombia, eight in the United States, and others in Spain and elsewhere in South America (Chile and Ecuador). Through the Juan Valdez coffee shops, Colombia is trying to expand its involvement in coffee consumption, not limiting itself to selling coffee beans to be roasted abroad and later sold at the retail level, but rather attempting to capture part of the coffee retail market itself, where most of the profits are made.

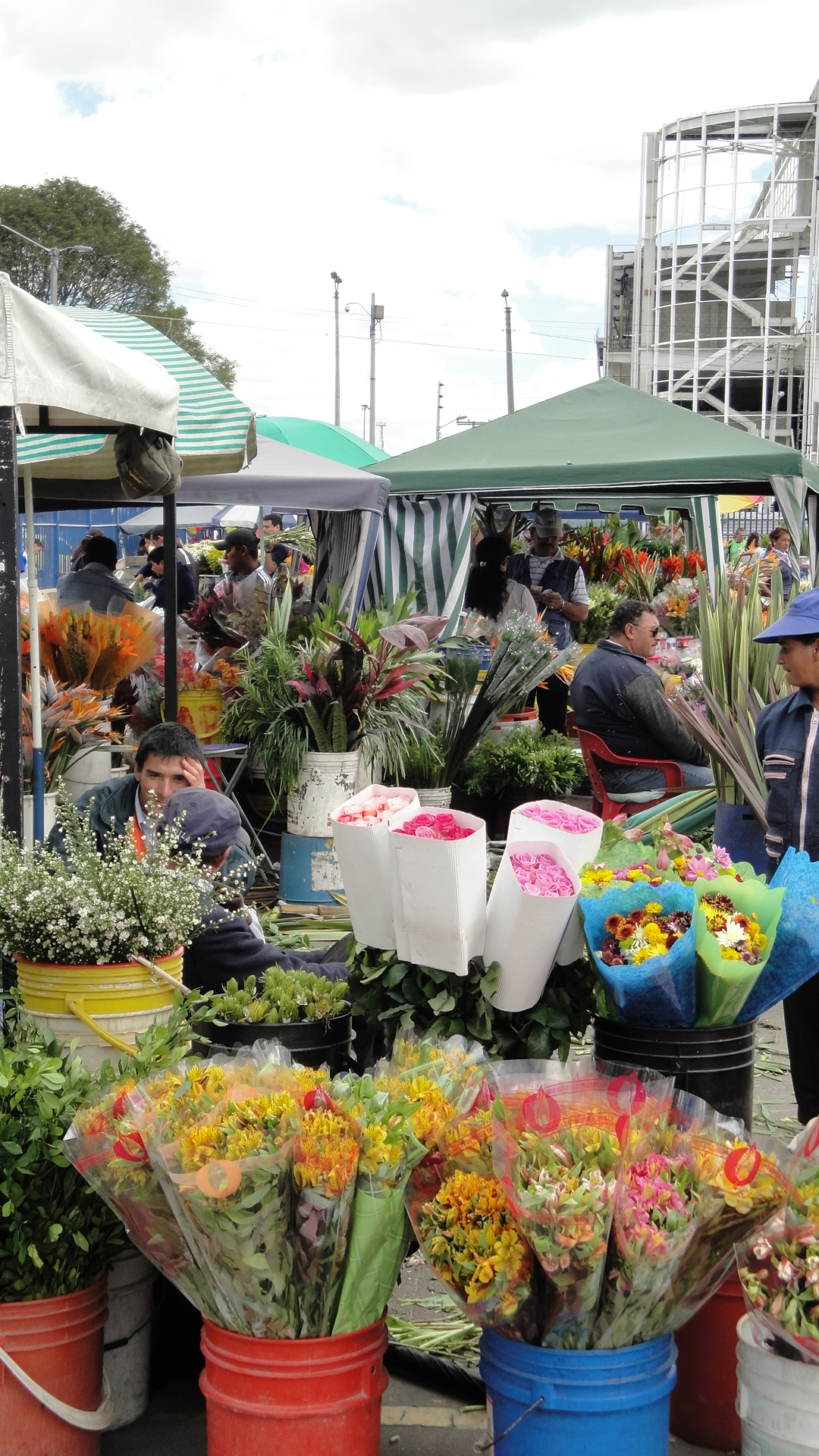
Flower market, Bogota

=== Flowers ===
Cut-flower production represented 4.2 percent of agricultural GDP in Colombia in 2006, generating 94,000 direct jobs and 80,000 indirect jobs, and it is estimated that about 1 million Colombians depend on income generated by the growth of flowers. Women account for 60 percent of the workers in the flower industry, and their terms of employment are favorable in light of Colombia's overall labor markets. Nevertheless, working conditions, which may include exposure to pesticide spray, are far from ideal. Flowers are produced by 300 companies on 600 farms, 20 percent of which are owned by foreign investors, located mainly in the Bogotá savanna and the Rionegro region in the department of Antioquia. Most of the production consists of roses, carnations, mini-carnations, and chrysanthemums.

The flower sector is an example of Colombian entrepreneurship in international markets, with little government involvement. Colombia has long been the second-largest cut-flower exporter in the world, behind the Netherlands, and continues to be the largest flower exporter to the United States. Colombia's flower exports in 2004 amounted to US$704 million, making flowers the country's second most valuable legal agricultural export, behind coffee and ahead of bananas and sugar. After the United States, which receives 82 percent of Colombia's flower exports, the second-largest market for Colombia's flowers is the European Union (EU), with 9 percent.

The Colombian Association of Flower Exporters (Asociación Colombiana de Exportadores de Flores, or Asocolflores) represents Colombian flower producers and exporters on trade policy and legal issues, mainly with the policy makers of Colombia, the United States, and the EU. Asocolflores also addresses sectoral issues, such as transportation, market intelligence, and R&D.

=== Bananas ===
Colombian bananas (excluding plantains) are another export success story of Colombia's agriculture. Despite the violence that has long affected the producing regions, banana exports, which amounted to about US$525 million in 2006, are the third-largest legal agricultural export of the country, behind coffee and flowers. In 2005 Colombia was the tenth-largest producer, with 2.5 percent of the world's banana output, and the third-largest exporter, with 8 percent of the world's exports after Ecuador and Costa Rica. Output for export, mainly of the Cavendish Valery variety, is highly productive compared to international standards. The Urabá region in Antioquia and the northeast of Magdalena Department are the main areas producing bananas for export. Chiquita Brands International, Dole Food Company, and Del Monte Fresh Produce are among the most important banana-marketing companies in Colombia.

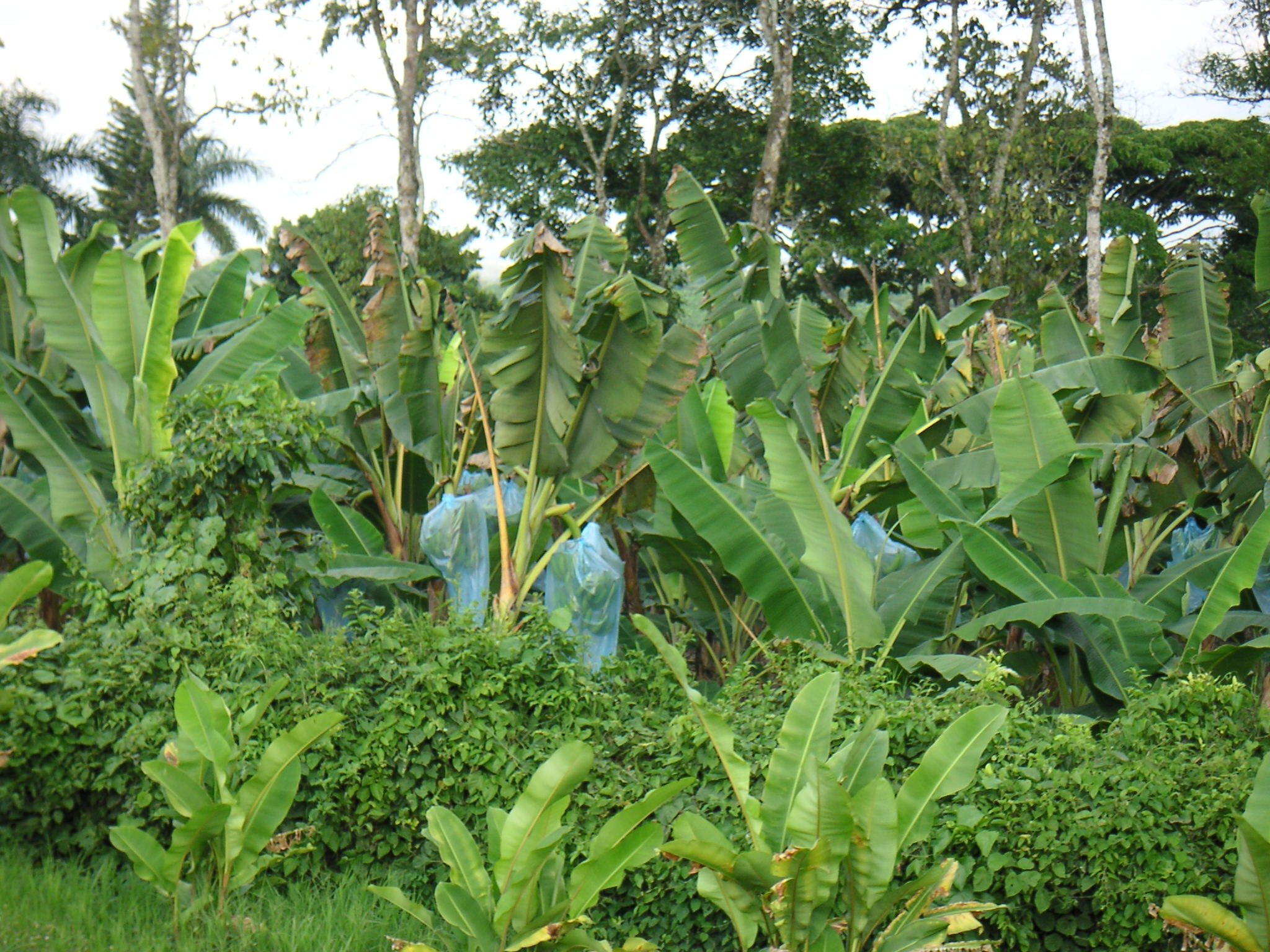
Banana plants in Armenia, Quindío

The main destination of Colombia's banana exports is the EU, and the second is the United States. Given the importance of the EU's banana market for Colombia and for Latin America, the outcome of the continuing disputes at the World Trade Organization (WTO) with regard to quotas and tariffs is a major issue to this sector. In November 2007, the WTO ruled against the dramatically increased duties imposed by the EU on its imports of Colombian bananas in January 2006.

About 9 percent of Colombia's banana output is destined for the domestic market, and 70 percent of this production is located mainly in the departments of Valle del Cauca and Tolima. Production for domestic consumption is not as sophisticated in technological terms as that for export markets. Producers and exporters are organized in several associations, of which the best known is the Association of Colombian Banana Producers (Asociación de Bananeros de Colombia, or Augura). Plantains are less important than bananas as a Colombian export but have a larger output share, representing 5.2 percent of agricultural GDP in 2006.

=== Sugar ===
Sugar production, which represented 2.5 percent of agricultural GDP in 2004, is concentrated in Valle del Cauca Department and is based on sugarcane output. Colombia has about 1,200 sugarcane producers, 14 sugar mills, and about 53 confectionery firms; the sector is one of the most productive for sugar in the world.

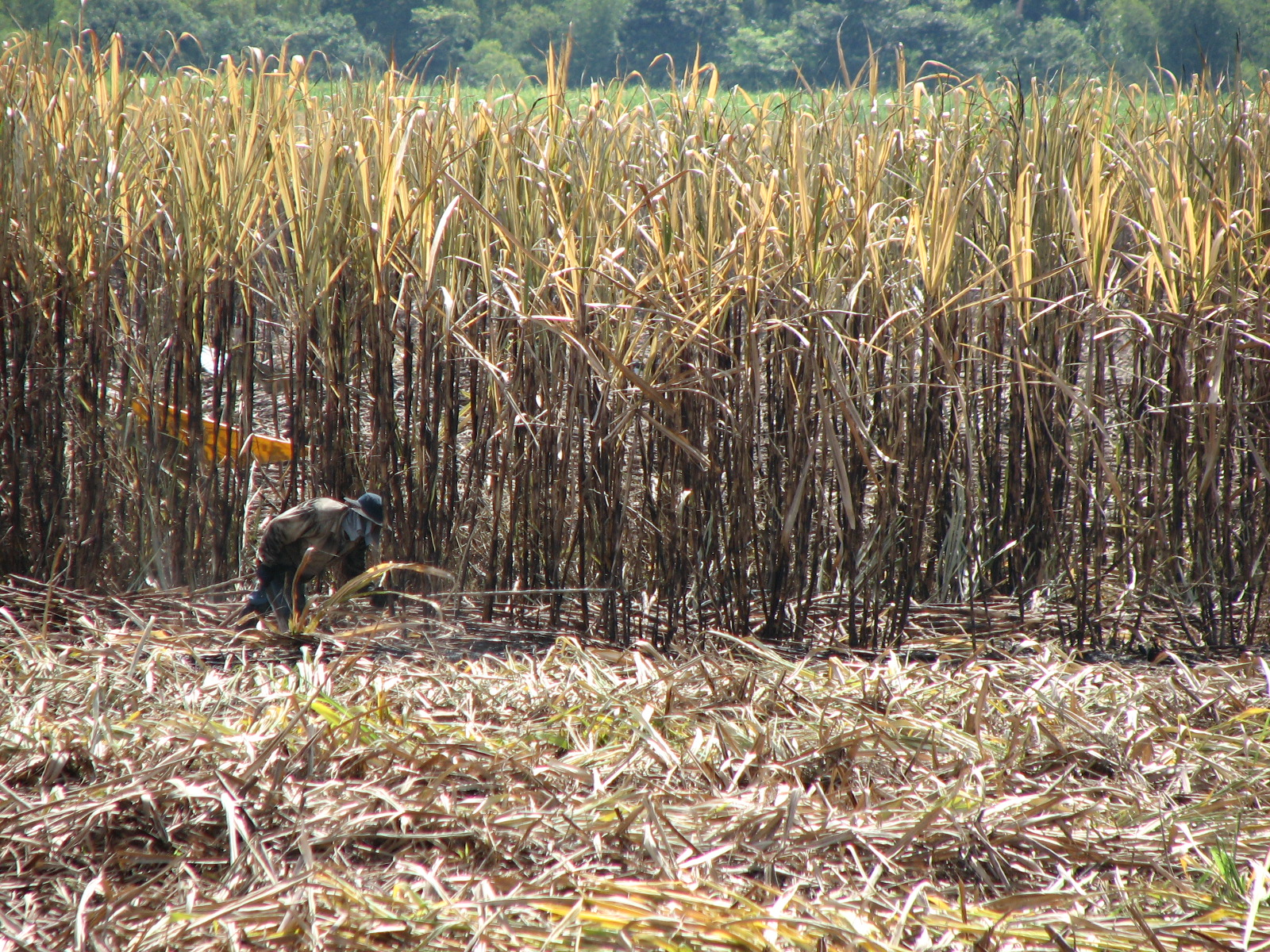
Sugar plantation in the Cauca Valley

The domestic market is highly protected through the Andean Price-Band System; domestic prices are therefore higher than international prices, which has hurt consumers and producers using sugar as an input. In order to avoid extra sugar costs for the domestic confectionery industry competing in the international markets, a joint program between domestic confectioners and the sugar producers began in 1993, allowing the confectionery firms access to sugar inputs for its exports at more competitive prices.

About half of Colombia's sugar output is exported, one quarter is used for domestic consumption, and the rest is sold as an input to the industrial sector. Colombia is the seventh-largest exporter of raw sugar in the world and the fifth-largest exporter of refined sugar, with exports of US$369 million in 2006. The main export destinations for Colombian sugar are the Andean countries, the United States, and Russia.

Government policies aimed at lowering dependence on fossil fuels and reducing pollution have boosted the production of ethanol derived from sugars. Vehicles have been using ethanol mixed with gasoline in Colombia's major cities since 2005. Thus, several sugar mills have begun to build ethanol distilleries, and it now appears that about 40 percent of sugar exports will be redirected to ethanol production by around 2010.

Thirteen of the 14 Colombian sugar mills are members, along with a group of sugarcane producers, of the Association of Sugarcane Growers (Asociación de Cultivadores de Caña de Azúcar de Colombia, or Asocaña), an influential business group. The Colombian Association of Sugarcane Producers and Suppliers (Asociación Colombiana de Productores y Proveedores de Caña de Azúcar, or Procaña) also represents sugarcane producers, and the Sugarcane Research Center of Colombia (Centro de Investigación de la Caña de Azúcar de Colombia, or Cenicaña) has made a positive contribution to Colombia's sugarcane productivity.

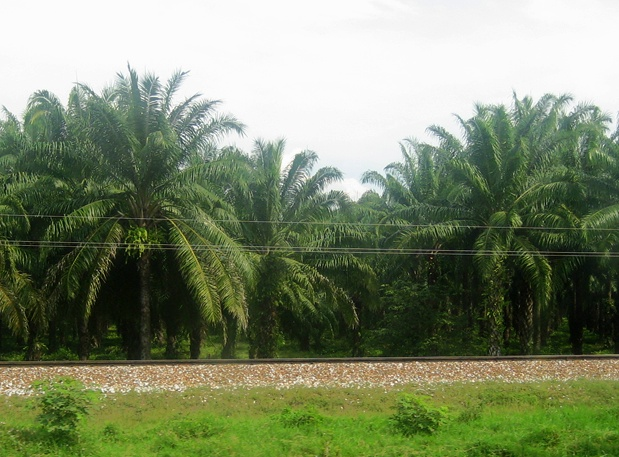
Oil palm plantation in Magdalena

=== Palm oil ===
Oil-palm tree fruits, soybeans, cottonseeds, and sesame seeds are the main sources of Colombian vegetable oils. Colombia is a net importer of all of its vegetable oil needs except for oil-palm tree fruits, which grow in many regions of the country, including the departments of Meta, Cesar, Santander, Nariño, and Magdalena. Palm oil production was highly protected in the 1980s, but less so thereafter. An import tariff and a price band have remained as protection mechanisms. The way the oil-palm tree industry operates is closely tied to the existence of a price-stabilization fund, which equalizes the higher domestic price with the lower export price, as a tool to promote palm-oil exports.

Output of palm oil tripled between 1990 and 2006, putting Colombia among the world's top five producing countries and making the country the largest producer in the Americas, although with a world-market share of only 2 percent in 2006. Production of palm oil is expected to increase further because it is an important component in Colombia's biodiesel industry, which began in 2008. It has been estimated that Colombia can produce biodiesel more efficiently than the United States and Europe, but further improvements are required because Colombia's biodiesel production is still not as efficient as that of world leaders Indonesia and Malaysia. The government nevertheless expects the demand for biodiesel to increase fourfold between 2008 and 2019, so there are plans to expand oil-palm tree cultivation from 330,000 hectares in 2007 to 1 million hectares, with partial funding from the U.S. Agency for International Development (USAID). This planned increase in the production of oil-palm trees is both an alternative to the extensive use of land for cattle and its use for growing illegal crops, and a source of employment for former members of illegal armed groups. However, the latter have sometimes displaced ethnic minority communities in taking over their land.

== Labor Practices ==
In 2014, the U.S. Department of Labor reported that 2.3% of Colombian children aged 5 to 14 years old worked in the agricultural sector, making up 39.2% of the total number of the children working in the country. In December 2014, the DOL issued a List of Goods Produced by Child Labor or Forced Labor reporting instances of child labor in two government-identified priority sectors namely coffee and sugarcane. Efforts to combat child labor in the Colombian agricultural sector remain limited.

== See also ==
- Environmental issues in Colombia
- Irrigation in Colombia
- Coca production in Colombia
