= Vegetable oil fuel =

Alternative fuel in diesel engines

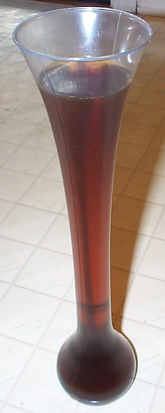
Waste vegetable oil that has been filtered

Vegetable oil can be used as an alternative fuel in diesel engines and in heating oil burners. When vegetable oil is used directly as a fuel, in either modified or unmodified equipment, it is referred to as straight vegetable oil (SVO) or pure plant oil (PPO). Conventional diesel engines can be modified to help ensure that the viscosity of the vegetable oil is low enough to allow proper atomization of the fuel. This prevents incomplete combustion, which would damage the engine by causing a build-up of carbon. Straight vegetable oil can also be blended with conventional diesel or processed into biodiesel, HVO or bioliquids for use under a wider range of conditions.

== History ==
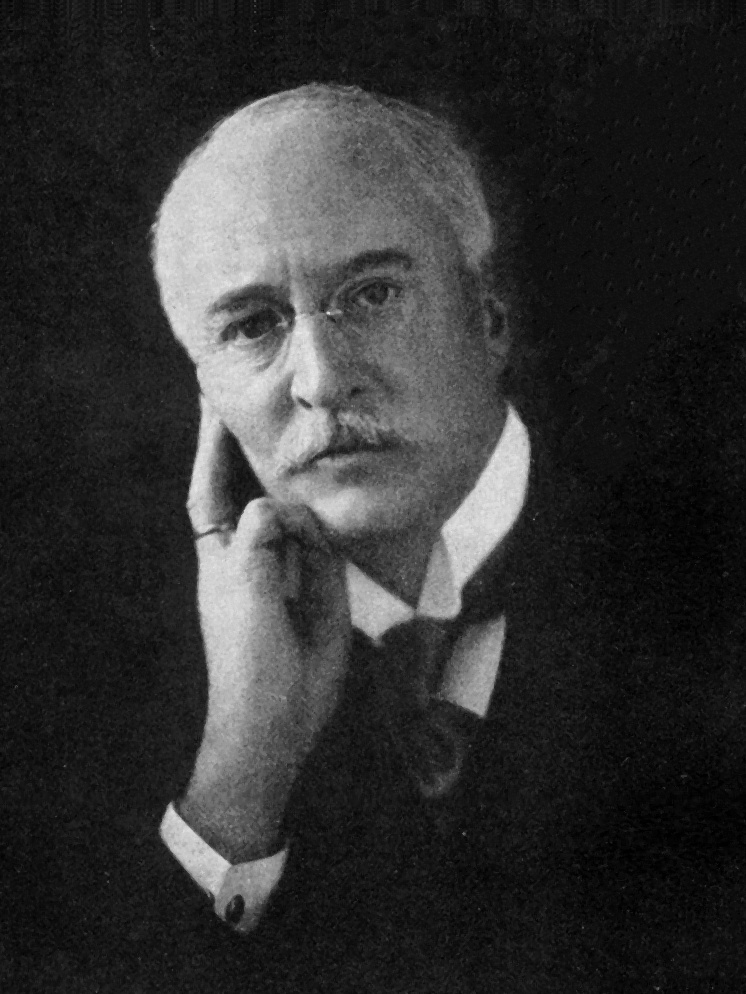
Rudolf Diesel, inventor of the diesel engine.

Rudolf Diesel was the father of the engine which bears his name. His first attempts were to design an engine to run on coal dust, but he later designed his engine to run on vegetable oil. The idea, he hoped, would make his engines more attractive to farmers having a source of fuel readily available. In a 1912 presentation to the British Institute of Mechanical Engineers, he cited a number of efforts in this area and remarked, "The fact that fat oils from vegetable sources can be used may seem insignificant today, but such oils may perhaps become in course of time of the same importance as some natural mineral oils and the tar products are now."

Periodic petroleum shortages spurred research into vegetable oil as a diesel substitute during the 1930s and 1940s, and again in the 1970s and early 1980s when straight vegetable oil enjoyed its highest level of scientific interest. The 1970s also saw the formation of the first commercial enterprise to allow consumers to run straight vegetable oil in their automobiles, Elsbett of West Germany. In the 1990s Bougainville conflict, islanders cut off from oil supplies due to a blockade fueled their vehicles with coconut oil.

== Application and usability ==
=== Modified fuel systems ===
Most diesel car engines are suitable for the use of straight vegetable oil (SVO), also commonly called pure plant oil (PPO), with certain modifications. Principally, the viscosity and surface tension of the SVO/PPO must be reduced by preheating it, typically by using waste heat from the engine or electricity; otherwise, poor atomization, incomplete combustion, and carbonization may result. One common solution is to add a heat exchanger and an additional fuel tank for the petrodiesel or biodiesel blend and to switch between this additional tank and the main tank of SVO/PPO. The engine is started on diesel, switched over to vegetable oil as soon as it is warmed up, and switched back to diesel shortly before being switched off to ensure that no vegetable oil remains in the engine or fuel lines when it is started from cold again. In colder climates it is often necessary to heat the vegetable oil fuel lines and tank as it can become very viscous and even solidify.

Single-tank conversions were developed largely in Germany and are now used throughout Europe. These conversions are designed to provide reliable operation with rapeseed oil that meets the German rapeseed oil fuel standard DIN 51605. Modifications to the engine's cold start regime assist combustion on start up and during the engine warm up phase. Suitably modified indirect injection (IDI) engines have proven to be operable with 100% PPO down to temperatures of −10 °C (14 °F). Direct injection (DI) engines generally have to be preheated with a block heater or diesel fired heater. The exception is the VW TDI (Turbocharged Direct Injection) engine for which a number of German companies offer single-tank conversions. For long-term durability it has been found necessary to decrease the oil change interval and pay increased attention to engine maintenance.

=== Unmodified indirect injection engines ===
Many cars powered by indirect injection engines supplied by in-line injection pumps, or mechanical Bosch injection pumps are capable of running on pure SVO/PPO in all but winter temperatures. The most popular of these are the OM616 and OM617 engines found in the Mercedes-Benz W123 and W124 vehicles manufactured from 1980 through 1985. Indirect injection Mercedes-Benz vehicles with in-line injection pumps and cars featuring the PSA XUD engine tend to perform reasonably, especially as the latter is normally equipped with a coolant heated fuel filter. Engine reliability would depend on the condition of the engine. Attention to maintenance of the engine, particularly of the fuel injectors, cooling system and glow plugs will help to provide longevity. Ideally the engine would be converted.

=== Vegetable oil blending ===
The relatively high kinematic viscosity of vegetable oils must be reduced to make them compatible with conventional compression-ignition engines and fuel systems. Cosolvent blending is a low-cost and easy-to-adapt technology that reduces viscosity by diluting the vegetable oil with a low-molecular-weight solvent. This blending, or "cutting", has been done with diesel fuel, kerosene, and gasoline, among others; however, opinions vary as to the efficacy of this. Noted problems include higher rates of wear and failure in fuel pumps and piston rings when using blends.

=== Home heating ===
When liquid fuels made from biomass are used for energy purposes other than transport, they are called bioliquids or biofuels.

With often minimal modification, most residential furnaces and boilers that are designed to burn No. 2 heating oil can be made to burn either biodiesel or filtered, preheated waste vegetable oil (WVO). New standard oil burners are certified to operate on 20% biodiesel (B-20). Higher blends are possible with care, since biodiesel tends to liberate existing tarry deposits in fuel tank, which may tend to clog one or more filters. Conventional oil burners tend to clog and char if more than a smaller fraction of vegetable oil is mixed with conventional oil fuel. If the vegetable oil is cleaned at home by the consumer, WVO can result in considerable savings. Many restaurants will receive a minimal amount for their used cooking oil, and processing to a biofuel is fairly simple and inexpensive. Making the oil into biodiesel involves some toxic and hazardous chemical transformations. Burning filtered WVO directly is somewhat more problematic, since it is more viscous and has a higher ignition temperature; nonetheless, its burning can be accomplished with suitable preheating or burners designed to operate on it. WVO can thus be an economical heating option for those with the necessary mechanical and experimental aptitude.

==== Combined heat and power ====
A number of companies offer compression ignition engine generators optimized to run on plant oils where the waste engine heat is recovered for heating.

== Properties ==
The main form of SVO/PPO used in the UK is rapeseed oil (also known as canola oil, primarily in the United States and Canada) which has a freezing point of −10 °C (14 °F). However the use of sunflower oil, which gels at around −12 °C (10 °F), is currently being investigated as a means of improving cold-weather starting. However, oils with lower gelling points tend to be less saturated (leading to a higher iodine number) and polymerize more easily in the presence of atmospheric oxygen.

=== Material compatibility ===
Polymerization also has been consequentially linked to catastrophic component failures such as injection pump shaft seizure and breakage, injector tip failure leading to various and/or combustion chamber components damaged. Most metallurgical problems such as corrosion and electrolysis are related to water-based contamination or poor choices of plumbing (such as copper or zinc) which can cause gelling – even with petroleum-based fuels.

=== Temperature effects ===
Some Pacific island nations are using coconut oil as fuel to reduce their expenses and their dependence on imported fuels while helping stabilize the coconut oil market. Coconut oil is only usable where temperatures do not drop below 17 degrees Celsius (63 degrees Fahrenheit), unless two-tank SVO/PPO kits or other tank-heating accessories, etc. are used. The same techniques developed to use, for example, canola and other oils in cold climates can be implemented to make coconut oil usable in temperatures lower than 17 degrees Celsius (63 degrees Fahrenheit)

== Availability ==
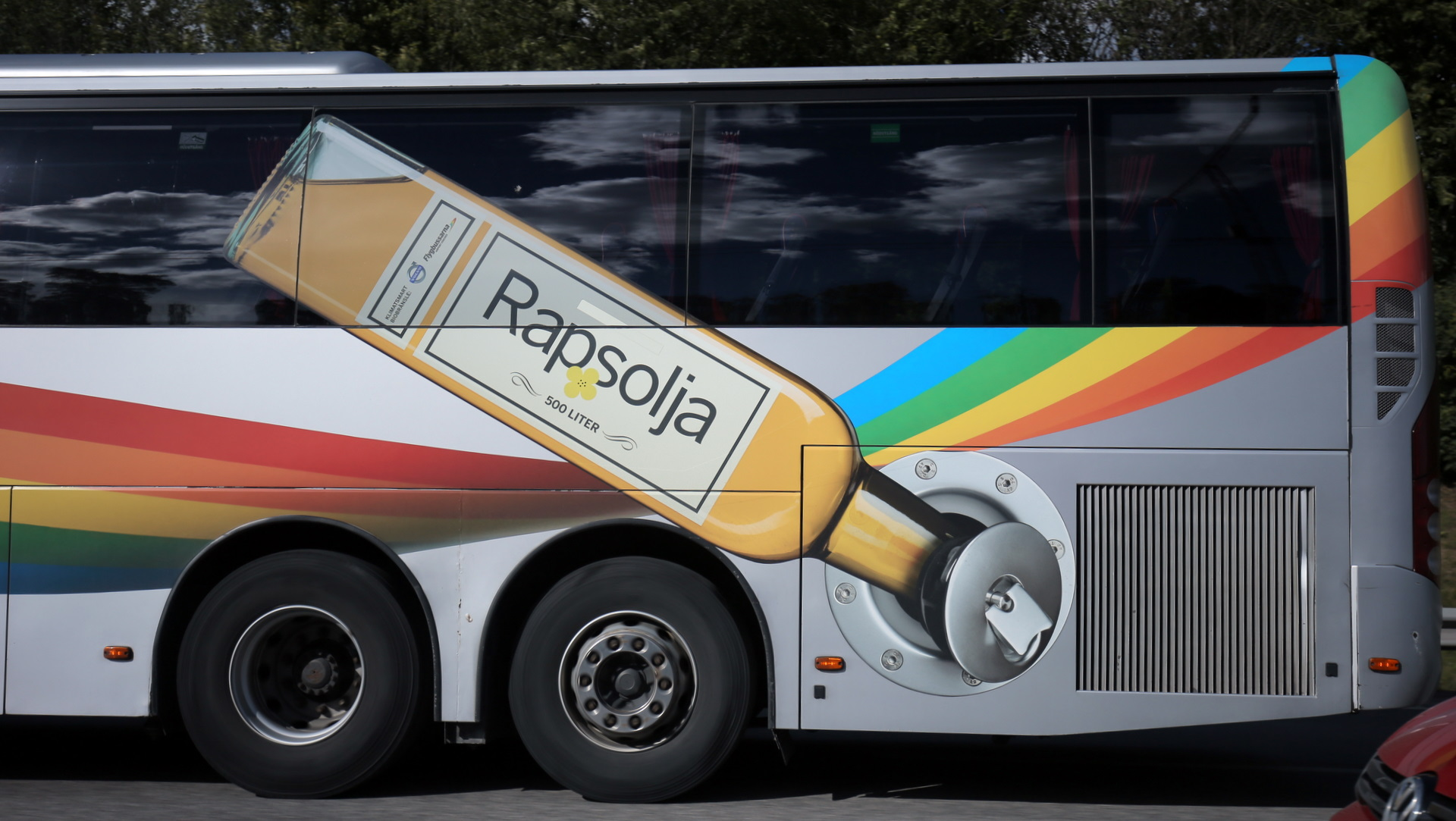
Biodiesel bus in Sweden

=== Recycled vegetable oil ===
Recycled vegetable oil, also termed used vegetable oil (UVO), waste vegetable oil (WVO), used cooking oil (UCO), or yellow grease, is recovered from businesses and industry that use the oil for cooking.

As of 2000, the United States was producing in excess of 11 billion liters (2.9 billion U.S. gallons) of recycled vegetable oil annually, mainly from industrial deep fryers in potato processing plants, snack food factories, and fast food restaurants. If all those 11 billion liters could be recycled and used to replace the energy equivalent amount of petroleum (an ideal case), almost 1% of US oil consumption could be offset. Utilizing recycled vegetable oil as a replacement for standard petroleum-derived fuels like gasoline would reduce the price of gasoline by preserving the supply of petroleum.

=== Virgin vegetable oil ===
Virgin vegetable oil, also termed pure plant oil or straight vegetable oil, is extracted from plants solely for use as fuel. In contrast to used vegetable oil, is not a byproduct of other industries, and thus its prospects for use as fuel are not limited by the capacities of other industries. Production of vegetable oils for use as fuels is theoretically limited only by the agricultural capacity of a given economy. However, doing so detracts from the supply of other uses of pure vegetable oil.

== See also ==
- Biodiesel by region
- Bioliquids
- Civic amenity site; collection point for waste vegetable oil
- Cooking oil
- Dimethyl ether: another diesel fuel alternative
- Food vs. fuel
- Greasestock
- Gutter oil (oil drainage or brown grease)
- Issues relating to biofuels
- The Big Green Bus
- Vegetable oil recycling
- Vegetable oil refining
- Vegetable oils as alternative energy
- Yellow grease
- Grand Canyon Railway 4960
