= Bioliquids =

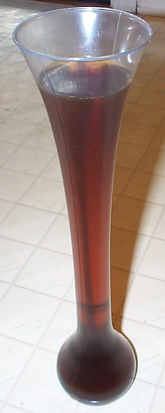
Filtered waste vegetable oil

Bioliquids are liquid fuels made from biomass for energy purposes other than transport (i.e. heating and electricity).

Bioliquids are usually made from virgin or used vegetable and seed oils, like palm or soya oil. These oils are burned in a power station to create heat, which can then be used to warm homes or boil water to make steam. This steam can then be used to drive a turbine to generate electricity.

Rudolf Diesel's first public exhibition of the internal combustion engine, that was to later bear his name, ran on peanut oil.

== Bioliquid production and use ==
Bioliquids have been used for many years to provide heat for homes on a small scale but now big energy providers are looking at their use on a larger scale.

A controversial plant in Bristol (UK) was recently given the go ahead despite receiving several hundred complaints. The plant will be built and operated by W4B and provide enough power for 25,000 homes.

== Advantages ==
Bioliquids have several key advantages over other sources of renewable energy:

- Bioliquids have a high energy density
- The technology is well established, having been used for many years
- Can be used on demand, reacting quickly to changes in demand for power
- Can help reduce dependency on foreign oil.
- Reduces the green house gas emissions.

== Disadvantages ==
Many of the same problems that affect biofuels also affect bioliquids and there are various social, economic, environmental and technical issues, which have been discussed in the popular media and scientific journals. These include: the effect of moderating oil prices, the "food vs fuel" debate, poverty reduction potential, carbon emissions levels, sustainable biofuel production, deforestation and soil erosion, loss of biodiversity, impact on water resources, as well as energy balance and efficiency.

Bioliquids also have several key problems compared to other sources of renewable energy:

- Price of fuel is very variable, due to competitiveness of feedstock for other uses (e.g. soap)
- Supply chain is still very new
- Governments, such as the EU, remained undecided on bioliquids

== See also ==
- Bioheat, a biofuel blended with heating oil.
- Life cycle assessment
- List of vegetable oils section on oils used as biodiesel
- Low-carbon economy
- Table of biodiesel crop yields
- Vegetable oil economy
- Vegetable oils as alternative energy
