= Vegetable oils as alternative energy =

Fuel made from plants

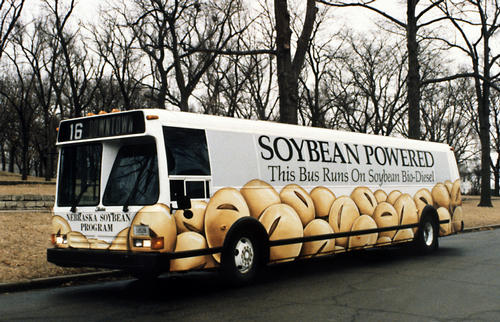
Nebraska school district soybean biodiesel powered bus made possible through the Soybean Board of Nebraska grant program.

Vegetable oils are increasingly used as a substitute for fossil fuels. Vegetable oils are the basis of biodiesel, which can be used like conventional diesel. Some vegetable oil blends are used in unmodified vehicles, but straight vegetable oil often needs specially prepared vehicles which have a method of heating the oil to reduce its viscosity and surface tension, sometimes specially made injector nozzles, increased injection pressure and stronger glow-plugs, in addition to fuel pre-heating is used. Another alternative is vegetable oil refining.

The availability of biodiesel around the world is increasing, although still tiny compared to conventional fossil fuel sources. There is significant research in algaculture methods to make biofuel from algae.

Concerns have been expressed about growing crops for fuel use rather than food and the environmental impacts of large-scale agriculture and land clearing required to expand the production of vegetable oil for fuel use. These effects/impacts would need to be specifically researched and evaluated, economically and ecologically, and weighed in balance with the proposed benefits of vegetable oil fuel in relation to the use of other fuel sources.

== Future of energy for world economy ==
There is a limited amount of fossil fuel inside the Earth. Since the current world energy resources and consumption is mainly fossil fuels, society is very dependent on them for both transportation and electric power generation. The Hubbert peak theory predicts that oil depletion will result in oil production dropping off in the not too distant future. As time goes on our economy will have to transition to some alternative fuels. Fossil fuels have solved two problems which could be separately solved in the future: the problem of a source of primary energy and of energy storage. Along with straight vegetable oil and biodiesel, some energy technologies that could play an important part in the future include:

- hydrogen economy
- methanol fuel
- ethanol fuel
- lithium economy
- zinc-air battery
- liquid nitrogen economy
- synthetic fuel
- solar energy / photovoltaics
- nuclear power (fission power)
- fusion power
- wind power
- compressed air energy storage
- flywheel energy storage
- biofuel

== Net CO_{2} or greenhouse gas production ==
Plants use sunlight and photosynthesis to take carbon dioxide (CO_{2}) out of the Earth's atmosphere to make vegetable oil. The same CO_{2} is then put back after it is burned in an engine. Thus vegetable oil does not increase the CO_{2} in the atmosphere, and does not directly contribute to the problem of greenhouse gas. It is really a way of catching and storing solar energy; it is a renewable energy.

However, as with other energy sources, there may be a (relatively small) carbon footprint associated with the production or distribution of vegetable oil.

== Safety ==
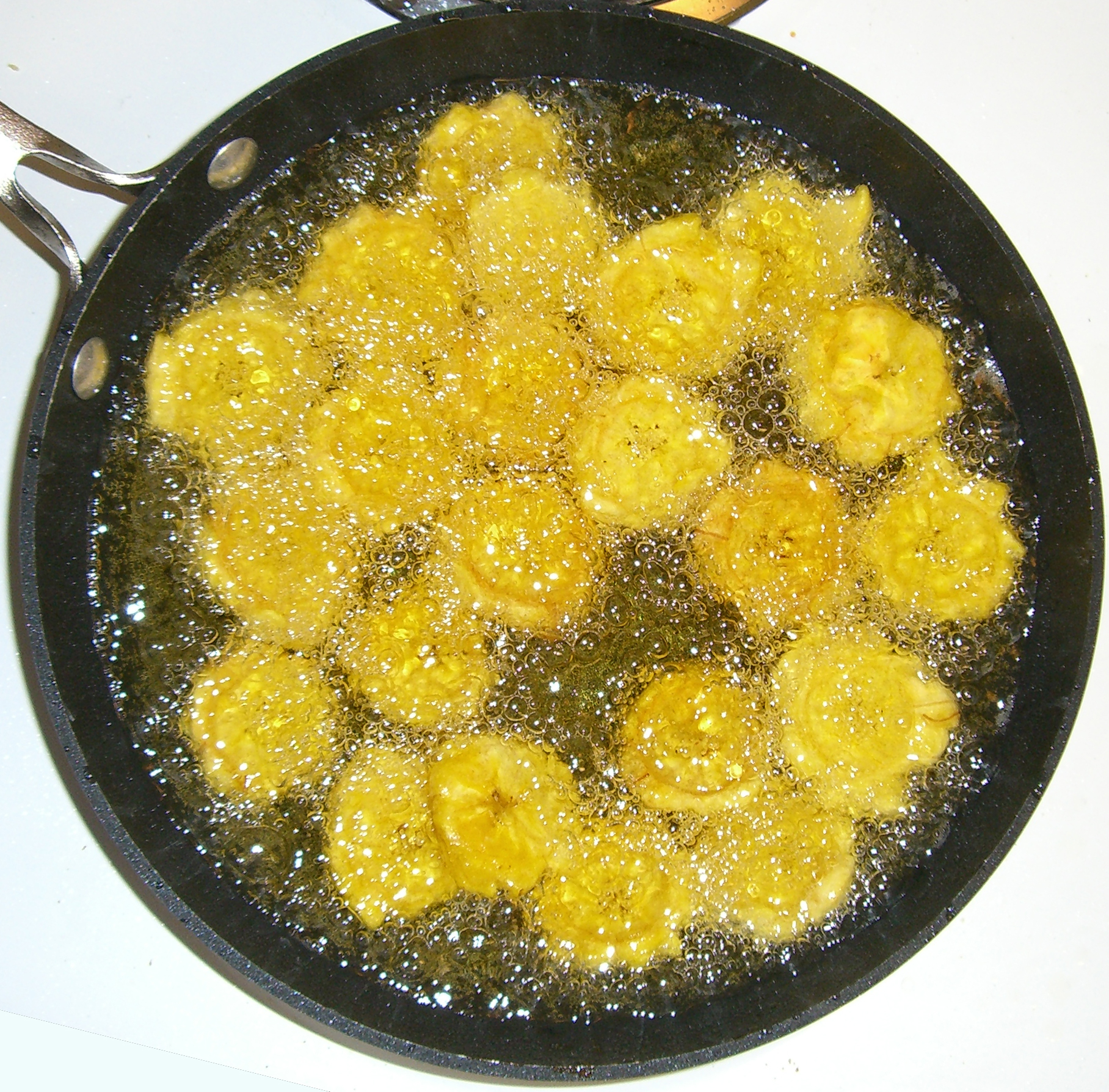
Plantains frying in vegetable oil

Vegetable oil is far less toxic than other fuels such as gasoline, petroleum-based diesel, ethanol, or methanol, and has a much higher flash point (approximately 275-290 °C). The higher flash point reduces the risk of accidental ignition. Some types of vegetable oil are edible.

== Generation and storage ==
Technologies of hydrogen economy, batteries, compressed air energy storage, and flywheel energy storage address the energy storage problem but not the source of primary energy. Other technologies like fission power, fusion power, and solar power address the problem of a source of primary energy but not energy storage. Vegetable oil addresses both the source of primary energy and of energy storage. The cost and weight to store a given amount of energy as vegetable oil is low compared to many of the potential replacements for fossil fuels.

== Type of vegetable oil ==
The list of vegetable oils article discusses which types of vegetable oil are used for fuel and where different types are grown.

== Transportation ==
Vegetable oil is used for transportation in four different ways:

- Vegetable oil blends - Mixing vegetable oil with diesel lets users get some of the advantages of burning vegetable oil and is often done with no modification to the vehicle.
- Biodiesel - Biodiesel can be produced from vegetable oil through the process of transesterification. Biodiesel burns like normal diesel and works fine in any diesel engine. The name just indicates that the fuel came from vegetable oil.
- Straight vegetable oil - Straight vegetable oil works in diesel engines if it is heated first. Some diesel engines already heat their fuel, others need a small electric heater on the fuel line. How well it works depends on the heating system, the engine, the type of vegetable oil (thinner is easier), and the climate (warmer is easier). Some data is available on results users are seeing. As vegetable oil has become more popular as a fuel, engines are being designed to handle it better. The Elsbett engine is designed to run on straight vegetable oil. However, as of the start of 2007, it seems that there are not any production vehicles warrantied for burning straight vegetable oil, although Deutz offers a tractor and John Deere are both known to be in late stages of engine development. There is a German grapeseed oil fuel standard DIN 51605. At this point straight vegetable oil is only a niche market although the market segment in Germany is rapidly growing with large haulage vehicle fleets adopting the fuel, largely for economic reasons. A growing number of decentralised oil mills provide a large part of this fuel.
- Vegetable oil refining - Vegetable oil can be used as feedstock for an oil refinery. There it can be transformed into fuel by hydrocracking (which breaks big molecules into smaller ones using hydrogen) or hydrogenation (which adds hydrogen to molecules). These methods can produce gasoline, diesel, or propane. Some commercial examples of vegetable oil refining are NExBTL, H-Bio, and the ConocoPhilips Process.

The transition can start with biodiesel, vegetable oil refining, and vegetable oil blends, since these technologies do not require the capital outlay of converting an engine to run on vegetable oils. Because it costs to convert vegetable oil into biodiesel it is expected that vegetable oil will always be cheaper than biodiesel. After there are production cars that can use straight vegetable oil and a standard type available at gas stations, consumers will probably choose straight vegetable oil to save money. So the transition to vegetable oil can happen gradually.

== Electricity generation ==
Other methods, like nuclear power, fusion power, wind power and solar power, may provide cheaper electricity, so vegetable oil may only be used in peaking power plants and small power plants, as diesel is limited to today. There is at least one 5 MW power plant that runs on biodiesel. MAN B&W Diesel, Wärtsilä and other companies produce engines suitable for power generation that can be fueled with pure plant oils.

== Market, cost, price, and taxes ==
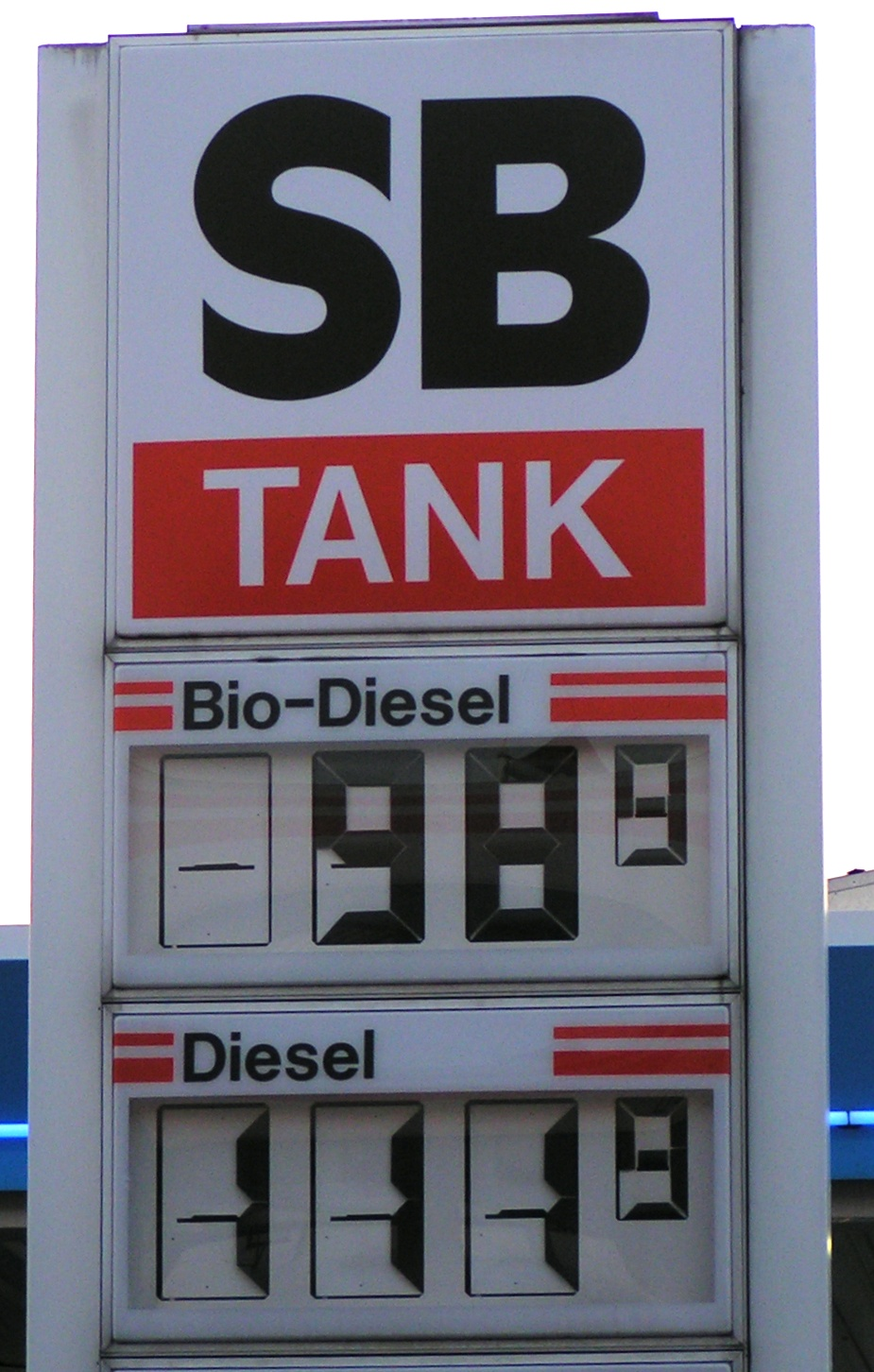
In some countries, filling stations sell bio-diesel more cheaply than conventional diesel.

In Europe, straight vegetable oil (SVO) costs 150 pence/litre at most supermarkets and somewhat less when bought in bulk direct from the manufacturers whereas diesel costs at around 120 pence per litre (in the UK as of December 2014) to well over that (depends on the year, 1.4 euro is the current market price in central Europe). In the USA, diesel costs about 0,6 $ per liter and the cheapest SVO costs about the same, with more expensive oils costing more than that (up to $7 per gallon).

The availability of biodiesel around the World is increasing. It is estimated that by 2010 the market for biodiesel will be 7.5 billion litres (2 billion USgallons) in the U.S and 9.5 billion litres (2.5 billion USgallons) in Europe. Biodiesel currently has 3% of the diesel market in Germany and is the number 1 alternative fuel. The German government has a Biofuels Roadmap in which they expect to reach 10% biofuels by 2010 with the diesel 10% coming from fuel made from vegetable oil.

From 2005 to 2007 a number of types of vegetable oil have doubled in price. The rise in vegetable oil prices is largely attributed to biofuel demand.

Much of the fuel price at the pump is due to fuel tax. If you buy vegetable oil at the grocery store it does not have such high taxes. So at times people have bought vegetable oil at the store for their cars because it was cheaper. They did this in spite of the fact that packaging by the gallon adds to the cost and it was illegal to use in a car since no fuel tax had been paid on it.

Since vegetable oil (even as biodiesel) does not contribute to greenhouse gas, governments may tax it much less than gasoline as they have done with ethanol. This would help them reach Kyoto Protocol targets.

== Production in sufficient quantity ==
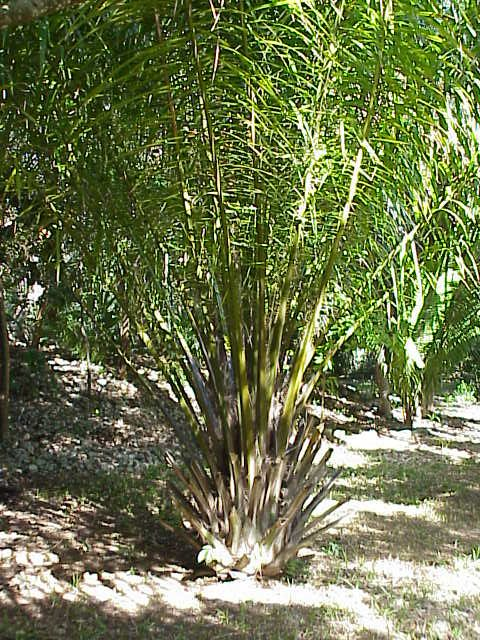
African Oil Palm (Elaeis guineensis

The World production of vegetable oil seed is forecast to be 418 million tonnes in 2008/09. After pressing this will make 131 million tonnes of vegetable oil. Much of this is from Oil Palm, and palm oil production is growing at 5% per year. At about 7.5 lb/USgal (900 g/L) this is about 38 billion USgallons (144 billion L). Currently vegetable oil is mostly used in food and some industrial uses with a small percentage used as fuel. The major fuel usage is by conversion to biodiesel with about 3 billion US gallons (11,000,000 m^{3}) in 2009.

In 2004 the US consumed 530 billion litres (140 billion USgal) of gasoline and 150 billion litres (40 billion USgal) of diesel. In biodiesel it says oil palm produces 5940 litres per hectare (635 USgal/acre) of palm oil each year. To make 180 billion US gallons (680,000,000 m^{3}) of vegetable oil each year would require 1,150,000 square kilometres (440,000 sq mi) or a square of land 1,070 kilometres (660 mi) on a side.

"The gradual move from oil has begun. Over the next 15 to 20 years we may see biofuels providing a full 25 percent of the world's energy needs. While the move is good for reducing greenhouse emissions, soaring oil prices have encouraged most countries to 'go green' by switching to greater use of biofuels." - Alexander Müller, Assistant Director-General of Sustainable Development at the FAO.

Algaculture could potentially produce far more oil per unit area. Results from pilot algaculture projects using sterile CO_{2} from power plant smokestacks look promising.

Genetic modifications to soybeans are already being used. Genetic modifications and breeding can increase vegetable oil yields. From 1979 to 2005 the soybean yield in bushels per acre more than doubled. A company has developed a variety of camelina sativa that yields 20% more oil than the standard variety.

== Environmental effects ==
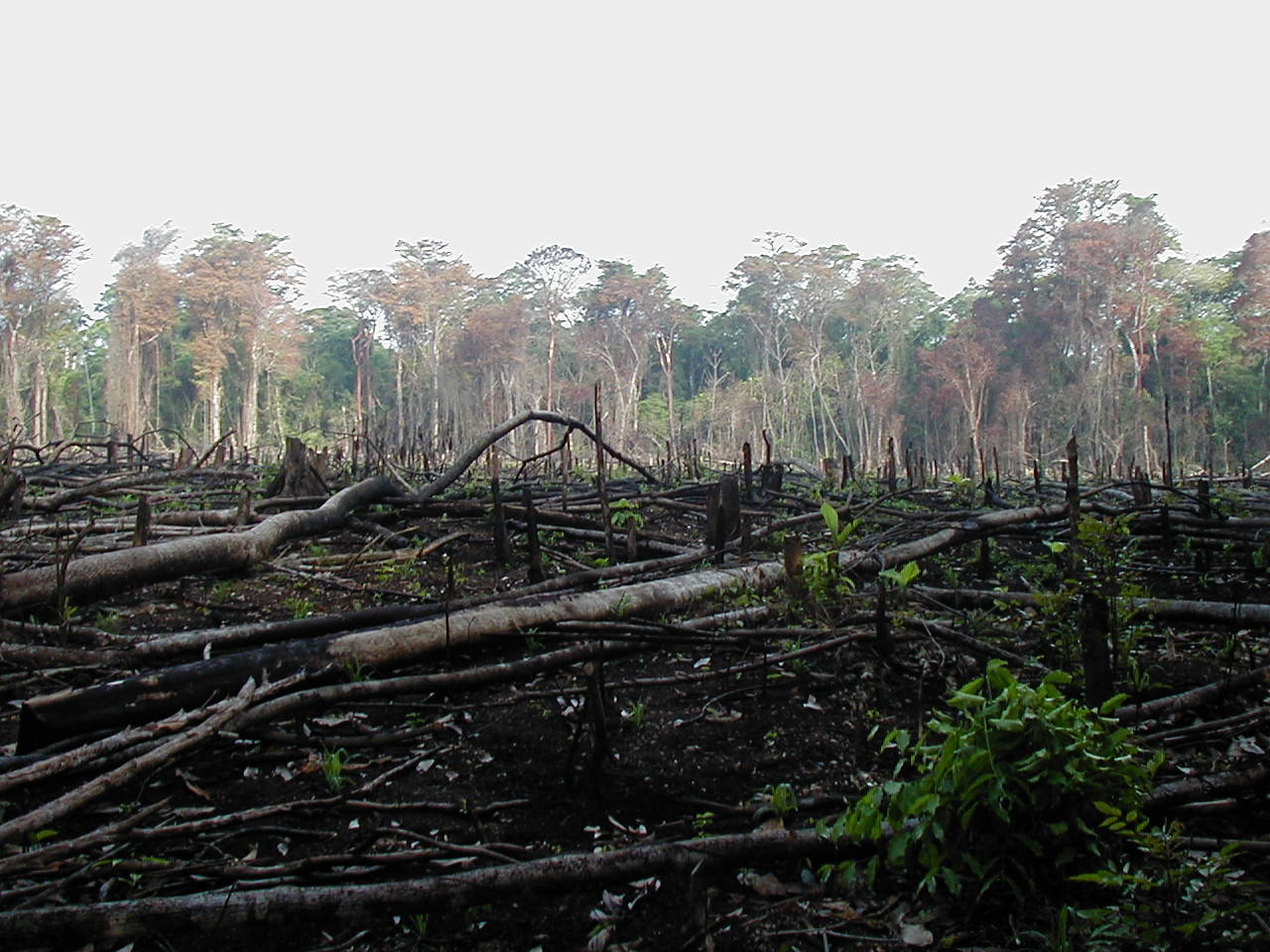
Jungle burned for agriculture in southern Mexico.

There is concern that the current growing demand for vegetable oil is causing deforestation, with old forests being replaced with oil palms. When land is cleared, it is often burned, releases large amounts of the greenhouse gas CO_{2}. Vegetable oil production would have to increase substantially to replace gasoline and diesel. With current technology, such an increase in production would have a substantial environmental impact.

== Food vs fuel debate ==
In some poor countries the rising price of vegetable oil is causing problems. There are those that say using a food crop for fuel sets up competition between food in poor countries and fuel in rich countries. Some propose that fuel only be made from non-edible vegetable oils like jatropha oil. Others argue that the problem is more fundamental. The law of supply and demand predicts that if fewer farmers are producing food the price of food will rise. It may take some time, as farmers can take some time to change which things they are growing, but increasing demand for biofuels is likely to result in price increases for many kinds of food. Some have pointed out that there are poor farmers and poor countries making more money because of the higher price of vegetable oil.

With the use of non-edible vegetable oils produced by trees such as Millettia Pinnata (formerly Pongamia Pinnata) or the Moringa oleifera tree, both which grow on borderline or non-arable land, the food versus fuel debate becomes less of an either/or question. Apart from their facility of growing in non-arable and/or marginal land, these trees offer major advantages over peanut, soy-bean, sunflower, etc., in that they have long lives (up to 100 years), very low maintenance (since the intensive husbandry is limited to the first few years of their producing lives) and can provide cash-crops to rural areas, such as rural India. In the case of Millettia Pinnata and a few others, the fact that they are nitrogen-fixing legumes is another very important factor, in that they do not deplete the soil. Among other benefits of these trees is that they have root-systems that penetrate much deeper and do not compete with shallow-rooted plants, like grass (once the trees have attained a certain maturity). This means that the land can be used for multiple purposes, such as grazing for animals. Yet another benefit of using Millettia Pinnata to produce bio-diesel is that it can tolerate low rainfall (as little as 250 ml per year), far below what most food-crops require, thus reducing yet more their potential to compete.

== Algae for vegetable oil production ==
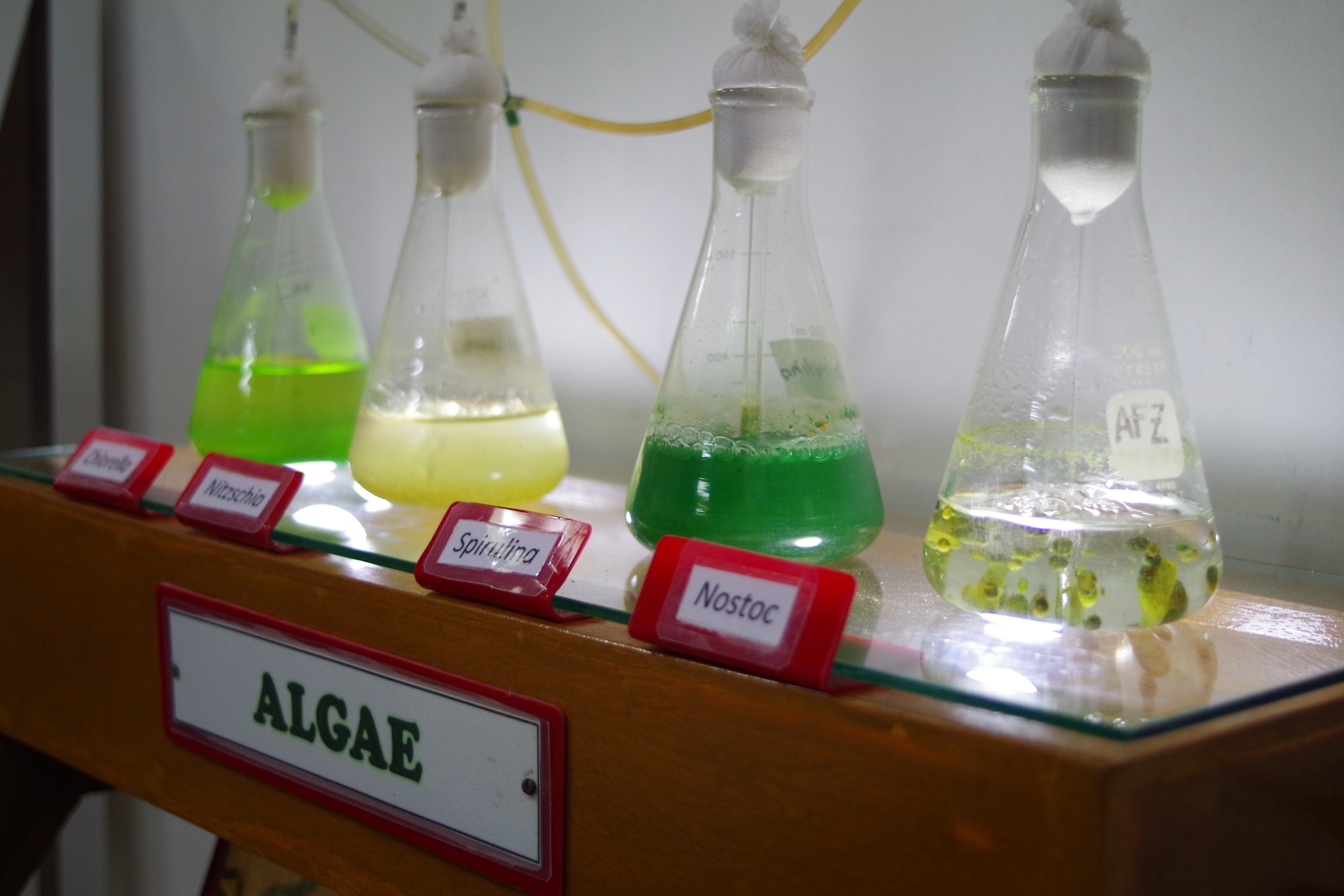

Some species of algae contain as much as 50% vegetable oil. Algae have very high growth rates compared to plants normally used to produce vegetable oil. Algae could potentially produce much more oil per area of land than current farming methods. Producing vegetable oil this way could result in reduced deforestation and less competition for food production land. Yusuf Chisti of the Institute of Technology and Engineering at Massey University states, "As demonstrated here, microalgal biodiesel is technically feasible. It is the only renewable biodiesel that can potentially completely displace liquid fuels derived from petroleum. Economics of producing microalgal biodiesel need to improve substantially to make it competitive with petrodiesel, but the level of improvement necessary appears to be attainable."

Governments trying to address the external costs of coal power plants may have a carbon tax or carbon credit that provides additional motivation to use CO_{2} from smokestacks. Since growing algae requires large amounts of sterile CO_{2}, smokestacks can be utilized for algaculture. Several commercial pilot plants are under construction.

There is substantial research and development work in this area but as of 2007 there is no commercial vegetable oil produced from algae and used as biofuel. ExxonMobil is investing $600 million and estimates they are 5 to 10 years from significant production, but could invest billions in final development and commercialization. If and when the commercialization challenges are overcome, vegetable oil production could expand very rapidly. In 2012, United States President Barack Obama supported the idea of getting oil from algae.

== See also ==
- Biodiesel by region
- Dimethyl ether: another diesel fuel alternative
- Food price crisis
- Greasestock
- Hydrocarbon economy
- List of vegetable oils
- Low-carbon economy
- Motor oil
- Renewable energy
- Straight vegetable oil
- Strategic Fuel Reserve
- Sustainable development
- Vegetable oil blends
