= Greasestock =

Coordinates: 41.24673°N 73.78453°W

Greasestock was an American event held yearly in Yorktown Heights, New York. Exhibitors showcase a variety of alternative energy vehicles, as well as exhibits with a sustainable lifestyle theme. Although it is illegal in New York to power a vehicle with waste vegetable oil, authorities in New York have stated they had no problem with the festival and even participated in it.

The event was founded in 2003 by individuals who shared an interest in vegetable powered vehicles. It is held on the grounds of Peter Pratt's Inn, a historic landmark. According to Jon Pratt, founder of the event, while the original event hosted only eight people interested in discussing alternatives to gas, each successive incarnation of the Greasestock celebration has drawn more and more visitors from all over the United States who are interested in cheaper gas, cleaner energy, and helping the environment.

The green technologies demonstrated at the event included vegetable oil powered cars, biodiesel cars, solar powered cars, home heating alternatives, and organic farming exhibits. The event drew exhibitors from all over the United States, and included among the hundred or so vehicles on display is a vegetable-powered garbage truck from Mamaroneck, New York, the first of its kind in New York.
