= Vegetable oil =

Oil extracted from seeds or from other parts of plants

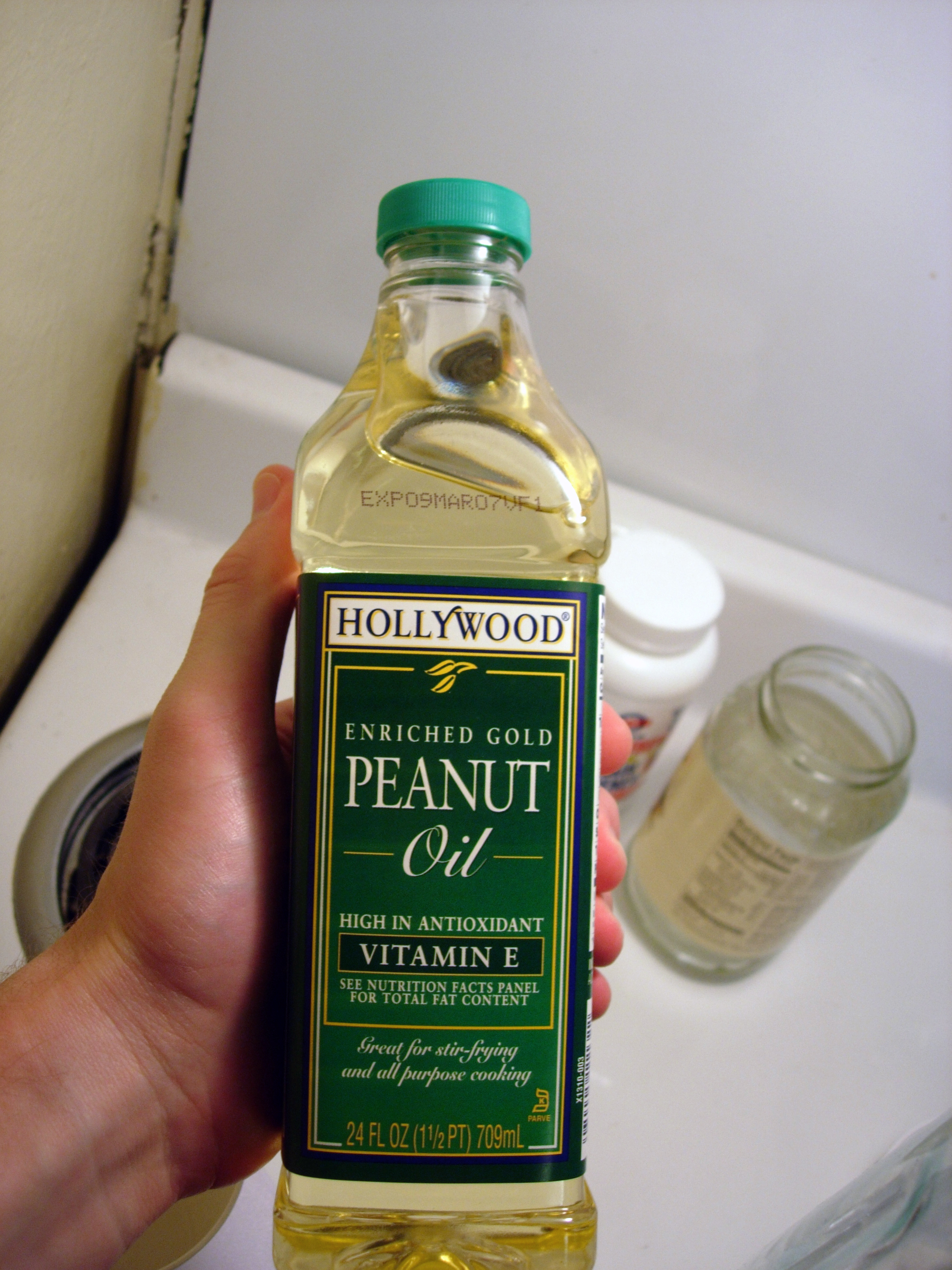
A bottle of peanut oil

Vegetable oils, or vegetable fats, are oils extracted from seeds or from other parts of edible plants. Like animal fats, vegetable fats are mixtures of triglycerides. Soybean oil, canola oil, grapeseed oil, and cocoa butter are examples of seed oils, or fats from seeds. Olive oil, palm oil, and rice bran oil are examples of fats from other parts of plants. In common usage, vegetable oil may refer exclusively to vegetable fats which are liquid at room temperature. Vegetable oils are usually edible and are generally recognized as safe (GRAS) by the United States Food and Drug Administration (FDA). There is no evidence that seed oils are unhealthy.

Vegetable oils have been used for thousands of years (dating back to at least 6000 BC for olive oil) and were historically important for cooking, lighting, medicine, and industry. Palm oil later becoming a major global commodity during the Industrial Revolution. In the 19th and 20th centuries, scientific advances (like understanding fats and hydrogenation) led to modern products such as margarine and shortening. Oils like soybean and canola became dominant in global markets. Today, vegetable oils are widely used in food, manufacturing (e.g., cosmetics, paints, lubricants), and biofuel, and are produced mainly by pressing or chemical extraction. Global output is rising significantly due to demand, especially for palm oil.

== History ==
=== Antiquity ===
Olive oil has been a part of human culture for millennia. Archaeological evidence shows that olives were turned into olive oil by 6000 BC and 4500 BC in present-day Israel. Pagnol, p. 19, says the 6th millennium in Jericho, but cites no source. In ancient Egypt, plant oils including cedar oil, cypress oil, and olive oil were used during the mummification process.

Vegetable oils have been used as lighting fuel for lamps, cooking, medicine and lubrication. Palm oil has long been recognized in West and Central African countries, and European merchants trading with West Africa occasionally purchased palm oil for use as a cooking oil in Europe. It became highly sought-after commodity by British traders for use as an industrial lubricant for machinery during Britain's Industrial Revolution.

=== Modern ===
Palm oil formed the basis of soap products, such as Lever Brothers' (now Unilever) "Sunlight", and B. J. Johnson Company's (now Colgate-Palmolive) "Palmolive", and by around 1870, palm oil constituted the primary export of some West African countries.

In 1780, Carl Wilhelm Scheele demonstrated that fats were derived from glycerol. Thirty years later, Michel Eugène Chevreul deduced that these fats were esters of fatty acids and glycerol. Wilhelm Normann, a German chemist, introduced the hydrogenation of liquid fats in 1901, creating what later became known as trans fats, leading to the development of the global production of margarine and vegetable shortening.

In the United States, cottonseed oil was developed and marketed by Procter & Gamble as a creamed shortening – Crisco – as early as 1911. Ginning mills were happy to have someone haul away the cotton seeds. The extracted oil was refined and partially hydrogenated to give a solid at room temperature and thus mimic natural lard, and canned under nitrogen gas. Compared to the rendered lard Procter & Gamble was already selling to consumers, Crisco was cheaper, easier to stir into a recipe, and could be stored at room temperature for two years without turning rancid.

Soybeans are protein-rich, and the medium-viscosity oil rendered from them was high in polyunsaturates. Henry Ford established a soybean research laboratory, developed soybean plastics and a soy-based synthetic wool, and built a car "almost entirely" out of soybeans. Roger Drackett had a successful new product with Windex. He invested heavily in soybean research, seeing it as a smart investment. By the 1950s and 1960s, soybean oil had become the most popular vegetable oil in the US; today it is second only to palm oil. In 2018–2019, world production was at 57.4 MT with the leading producers including China (16.6 MT), US (10.9 MT), Argentina (8.4 MT), Brazil (8.2 MT), and EU (3.2 MT).

The early 20th century also saw the start of the use of vegetable oil as a fuel in diesel engines and in heating oil burners. Rudolf Diesel designed his engine to run on vegetable oil. The idea, he hoped, would make his engines more attractive to farmers who had a source of fuel readily available. Diesel's first engine ran on its own power for the first time in Augsburg, Germany, on 10 August 1893 on nothing but peanut oil. In remembrance of this event, 10 August has been declared "International Biodiesel Day". The first patent on Biodiesel was granted in 1937. Periodic petroleum shortages spurred research into vegetable oil as a diesel substitute during the 1930s and 1940s, and again in the 1970s and early 1980s when straight vegetable oil enjoyed its highest level of scientific interest. The 1970s also saw the formation of the first commercial enterprise to allow consumers to run straight vegetable oil in their vehicles. However, biodiesel, produced from oils or fats using transesterification is more widely used. Led by Brazil, many countries built biodiesel plants during the 1990s, and it is now widely available for use in motor vehicles, and is the most common biofuel in Europe today. In France, biodiesel is incorporated at a rate of 8% in the fuel used by all French diesel vehicles.

In the mid-1970s, Canadian researchers developed a low-erucic-acid rapeseed cultivar. Because the word "rape" was not considered optimal for marketing, they coined the name "canola" (from "Canada Oil low acid"). The U.S. Food and Drug Administration approved use of the canola name in January 1985, and U.S. farmers started planting large areas that spring. Canola oil is lower in saturated fats and higher in monounsaturates. Canola is very thin (unlike corn oil) and flavorless (unlike olive oil), so it largely succeeds by displacing soy oil, just as soy oil largely succeeded by displacing cottonseed oil.

The production of vegetable oils went up 125% between 2000 and 2020, driven by a sharp increase in palm oil. The global production of vegetable oils went up 130% between 2000 and 2022 to 212 million tonnes in 2022. This is 120 million tonnes more than in 2000, but 3 million tonnes less than the peak observed in 2021. Palm oil registered the largest increase, both absolute and relative, as its production went up 57 million tonnes, or 255%; it overtook soybean oil as the main vegetable oil produced in 2006.

== Uses ==
Yearly per capita supply of oilcrops

=== Food ===
Many vegetable oils are consumed directly, or indirectly as ingredients in food – a role that they share with some animal fats, including butter, ghee, lard, and schmaltz. The oils serve several purposes in this role:

- Shortening – as in giving pastries a crumbly texture.
- Enriching – adding calories and satisfaction in consumption
- Texture – altering how ingredients combine, especially fats and starches
- Flavoring – examples include olive, sesame, or almond oil
- Flavor base – oils can also "carry" flavors of other ingredients, such as peppers, since many flavors are due to chemicals that are soluble in oil.

Oils can be heated to temperatures significantly higher than the boiling point of water, 100 °C (212 °F), and used to fry foods. Oils for this purpose must have a high flash point. Such oils include both the major cooking oils – soybean, canola/rapeseed, sunflower, safflower, peanut, cottonseed, etc. – and tropical oils, such as coconut, palm, and rice bran. The latter are particularly valued in Asian cultures for high-temperature cooking, because of their unusually high flash points.

=== Industrial ===
Vegetable oils are used as an ingredient or component in many manufactured products.

Many vegetable oils are used to make soaps, skin products, candles, perfumes, and other personal care and cosmetic products. Some oils are particularly suitable as drying oils, and are used in making paints and other wood treatment products. They are used in alkyd resin production. Dammar oil (a mixture of linseed oil and dammar resin), for example, is used almost exclusively in treating the hulls of wooden boats. Vegetable oils are increasingly being used in the electrical industry as insulators as vegetable oils are not toxic to the environment, biodegradable if spilled and have high flash and fire points. However, vegetable oils are less stable chemically, so they are generally used in systems where they are not exposed to oxygen, and they are more expensive than crude oil distillate. Synthetic tetraesters, which are similar to vegetable oils but with four fatty acid chains compared to the normal three found in a natural ester, are manufactured by Fischer esterification. Tetraesters generally have high stability to oxidation and have found use as engine lubricants. Vegetable oil is being used to produce biodegradable hydraulic fluid and lubricant.

One limiting factor in industrial uses of vegetable oils is that all such oils are susceptible to becoming rancid. Oils that are more stable, such as ben oil or mineral oil, are thus preferred for industrial uses. Castor oil has numerous industrial uses, owing to the presence of a hydroxyl group on the fatty acid. Castor oil is a precursor to Nylon 11. Castor oil may also be reacted with epichlorohydrin to make a glycidyl ether, which is used as a diluent and flexibilizer with epoxy resins.

=== Pet food ===
Vegetable oil is used in the production of some pet foods. AAFCO defines vegetable oil in this context as the product of vegetable origin obtained by extracting the oil from seeds or fruits which are processed for edible purposes.

=== Fuel ===
Vegetable oils are also used to make biodiesel, which can be used like conventional diesel. Some vegetable oil blends are used in unmodified vehicles but straight vegetable oil, also known as pure plant oil, needs specially prepared vehicles which have a method of heating the oil to reduce its viscosity. The use of vegetable oils as alternative energy is growing and the availability of biodiesel around the world is increasing.

The NNFCC estimates that the total net greenhouse gas savings when using vegetable oils in place of fossil fuel-based alternatives for fuel production, range from 18 to 100%.

== Production ==
The production process of vegetable oil involves the removal of oil from plant components, typically seeds. This can be done via mechanical extraction using an oil mill or chemical extraction using a solvent. The extracted oil can then be purified and, if required, refined or chemically altered.

=== Mechanical extraction ===
Oils can be removed via mechanical extraction, termed "crushing" or "pressing". This method is typically used to produce the more traditional oils (e.g., olive, coconut, etc.), and it is preferred by most health-food customers in the United States and in Europe. There are several different types of mechanical extraction. Expeller pressing extraction is common, though the screw press, ram press, and ghani (powered mortar and pestle) are also used. Oilseed presses are commonly used in developing countries, among people for whom other extraction methods would be prohibitively expensive; the ghani is primarily used in India. The amount of oil extracted using these methods varies widely, as shown in the following table for extracting mowrah butter in India:

Method	Percentage extracted
Ghani	20–30%
Expellers	34–37%
Solvent	40–43%

=== Solvent extraction ===
The processing of vegetable oil in commercial applications is commonly done by chemical extraction, using solvent extracts, which produces higher yields and is quicker and less expensive. The most common solvent is petroleum-derived hexane. This technique is used for most of the "newer" industrial oils such as soybean and corn oils. After extraction, the solvent is evaporated out by heating the mixture to about 149 °C (300 °F).

Supercritical carbon dioxide can be used as a non-toxic alternative to other solvents.

=== Hydrogenation ===
Unsaturated vegetable oils can be transformed through partial or complete hydrogenation into oils of higher melting point, some of which, such as vegetable shortening, will remain solid at room temperature.

Hydrogenating vegetable oil is done by raising a blend of vegetable oil and a metal catalyst, typically nickel, in a near-vacuum to very high temperatures, and introducing hydrogen. This causes the carbon atoms of the oil to break double bonds with other carbons. Each carbon atom becomes single-bonded to an individual hydrogen atom, and the double bond between carbons can no longer exist. A fully hydrogenated oil, also called a saturated fat, has had all of its double bonds converted into single bonds. If a polyunsaturated oil is left incompletely hydrogenated (not all of the double bonds are reduced to single bonds), then it is a "partially hydrogenated oil" (PHO). An oil may be hydrogenated to increase resistance to rancidity (oxidation) or to change its physical characteristics. As the degree of saturation is raised by full or partial hydrogenation, the oil's viscosity and melting point increase.

While full hydrogenation produces largely saturated fatty acids, partial hydrogenation results in the transformation of unsaturated cis fatty acids to unsaturated trans fatty acids in the oil mixture due to the heat used in hydrogenation. Partially hydrogenated oils and their trans fats have been linked to an increased risk of mortality from coronary heart disease, among other increased health risks. These concerns have led to regulations mandating the removal of partially hydrogenated oils from food.

=== Deodorization ===
In the processing of edible oils, the oil is heated under vacuum to near the smoke point or to about 232 °C (450 °F), and water is introduced at the bottom of the oil. The water is immediately converted to steam, which bubbles through the oil, carrying with it any chemicals that are water-soluble. The steam sparging removes impurities that can impart unwanted flavors and odors to the oil. Deodorization is key to the manufacture of vegetable oils. Nearly all soybean, corn, and canola oils found on supermarket shelves go through a deodorization stage that removes trace amounts of odors and flavors, and lightens the color of the oil. However, the process commonly results in higher levels of trans fatty acids and distillation of the oil's natural compounds.

=== Occupational exposure ===
People can breathe in vegetable oil mist in the workplace. The U.S. Occupational Safety and Health Administration (OSHA) has set the legal limit (permissible exposure limit) for vegetable oil mist exposure in the workplace as 15 mg/m^{3} total exposure and 5 mg/m^{3} respiratory exposure over an eight-hour workday. The U.S. National Institute for Occupational Safety and Health (NIOSH) has set a recommended exposure limit (REL) of 10 mg/m^{3} total exposure and 5 mg/m^{3} respiratory exposure over an eight-hour workday.

=== Yield ===
World production of main vegetable oils by main producers

Typical productivity of some oil crops, measured in tons (t) of oil produced per hectare (ha) of land per year (yr). Oil palm is by far the highest yielding crop, capable of producing about 4 tons of palm oil per hectare per year.

Crop	Yield (t/ha/yr)
Palm oil	4.0
Coconut oil	1.4
Canola oil	0.75
Soybean oil	0.45
Sunflower oil	0.6

=== Environmental impacts ===
The cultivation of crops used to produce vegetable oils contributes to habitat conversion and biodiversity loss, particularly when agricultural land expands into natural ecosystems. Environmental impacts vary depending on the crop, its location, and cultivation practices. Oil palm, for example, produces more oil per hectare than most other oil crops, but its expansion into tropical forests can have substantial ecological consequences.

A global modelling study published in 2026 estimated that oil-crop cultivation in 2020 was associated with the potential long-term loss of 1.5% of global plant and terrestrial vertebrate species. Oil palm, coconut and soybean cultivation accounted for approximately three-quarters of the estimated biodiversity impact. Nearly four-fifths of these impacts occurred in tropical regions, despite these regions accounting for less than half of the harvested area. More than half of the modelled biodiversity impacts were embodied in international trade.

== Particular oils ==
The following triglyceride vegetable oils account for almost all worldwide production, by volume. All are used as both cooking oils and as SVO or to make biodiesel. According to the USDA, the total world consumption of major vegetable oils in 2007/08 was:

Oil source	World consumption (million metric tons)	Notes
Palm	41.31	The most widely produced tropical oil, also used to make biofuel
Soybean	41.28	One of the most widely consumed cooking oils
Rapeseed	18.24	One of the most widely used cooking oils, also used as fuel. Canola is a variety (cultivar) of rapeseed.
Sunflower seed	9.91	A common cooking oil, also used to make biodiesel
Cottonseed	4.99	A major food oil, often used in industrial food processing
Palm kernel	4.85	From the seed of the African palm tree
Peanut	4.82	Mild-flavored cooking oil
Coconut	3.48	Used in cooking, cosmetics and soaps
Olive	2.84	Used in cooking, cosmetics, soaps and as a fuel for traditional oil lamps

These figures include industrial and animal feed use. The majority of European rapeseed oil production is used to produce biodiesel, or used directly as fuel in diesel cars, which may require modification to heat the oil to reduce its higher viscosity.

Other significant oils include:

- Corn oil, one of the most common cooking oils, is used for cooking oil, salad dressing, margarine, mayonnaise, prepared goods like spaghetti sauce and baking mixes, and to fry prepared foods like potato chips and French fries.
- Grape seed oil, used in cooking and cosmetics
- Hazelnut oil and other nut oils
- Linseed oil, from flax seeds
- Rice bran oil, from rice grains
- Safflower oil, a flavorless and colorless cooking oil
- Sesame oil, used as a cooking oil, and as a massage oil, particularly in India
- Açaí palm oil, used in culinary and cosmetics
- Jambú oil, is extracted from the flowers, leaves and stem from jambu (Acmella oleracea), contains spilanthol
- Graviola oil, derived from Annona muricata
- Tucumã oil, from Astrocaryum aculeatum is used to manufacture soap.
- Brazil nut oil, culinary and cosmetics use
- Carapa oil, pharmaceutical use and anti-mosquito candle
- Buriti oil, from Mauritia flexuosa, used in cosmetics (skin and hair care)
- Passion fruit oil, derived from Passiflora edulis, has varied applications in cosmetics manufacturing and for uses as a human or animal food.
- Pracaxi oil, obtained from Pentaclethra macroloba, cosmetics use
- Solanium oil, derived from chloroplasts, various applications in cooking

=== Composition of fats ===
Properties of vegetable oils The nutritional values are expressed as percent (%) by mass of total fat.
Type	Processing treatment	Saturated fatty acids	Monounsaturated fatty acids		Polyunsaturated fatty acids				Smoke point
Type	Processing treatment	Saturated fatty acids	Total	Oleic acid (ω−9)	Total	α-Linolenic acid (ω−3)	Linoleic acid (ω−6)	ω−6:3 ratio	Smoke point
Avocado		11.6	70.6	67.9	13.5	1	12.5	12.5:1	250 °C (482 °F)
Brazil nut		17.6	26.7	26.1	55.7	0.1	55.6	457:1	208 °C (406 °F)
Canola		7.4	63.3	61.8	28.1	9.1	18.6	2:1	204 °C (400 °F)
Coconut		82.5	6.3	6	1.7	0.019	1.68	88:1	175 °C (347 °F)
Corn		12.9	27.6	27.3	54.7	1	58	58:1	232 °C (450 °F)
Cottonseed		25.9	17.8	19	51.9	1	54	54:1	216 °C (420 °F)
Cottonseed	hydrogenated	93.6	1.5		0.6	0.2	0.3	1.5:1	
Flaxseed/linseed		9.0	18.4	18	67.8	53	13	0.2:1	107 °C (225 °F)
Grape seed		9.6	16.1	15.8	69.9	0.10	69.6	very high	216 °C (421 °F)
Hemp seed		7.0	9.0	9.0	82.0	22.0	54.0	2.5:1	166 °C (330 °F)
High-oleic safflower oil		7.5	75.2	75.2	12.8	0	12.8	very high	212 °C (414 °F)
Olive (extra virgin)		13.8	73.0	71.3	10.5	0.7	9.8	14:1	193 °C (380 °F)
Palm		49.3	37.0	40	9.3	0.2	9.1	45.5:1	235 °C (455 °F)
Palm	hydrogenated	88.2	5.7		0				
Peanut		16.2	57.1	55.4	19.9	0.318	19.6	61.6:1	232 °C (450 °F)
Rice bran oil		25	38.4	38.4	36.6	2.2	34.4	15.6:1	232 °C (450 °F)
Sesame		14.2	39.7	39.3	41.7	0.3	41.3	138:1	
Soybean		15.6	22.8	22.6	57.7	7	51	7.3:1	238 °C (460 °F)
Soybean	partially hydrogenated	14.9	43.0	42.5	37.6	2.6	34.9	13.4:1	
Sunflower oil		8.99	63.4	62.9	20.7	0.16	20.5	128:1	227 °C (440 °F)
Walnut oil	unrefined	9.1	22.8	22.2	63.3	10.4	52.9	5:1	160 °C (320 °F)

== Seed oil ==
Seed oils are vegetable oils obtained from the seed (endosperm) rather than other parts of plants. Most vegetable oils are seed oils. Examples are sunflower, corn, and sesame oils.

Claims that seed oils are unhealthy are not supported by scientific evidence.

== Used oil ==
A large quantity of used vegetable oil is produced and recycled, mainly from industrial deep fryers in potato processing plants, snack food factories and fast food restaurants.

Recycled oil has numerous uses, including use as a direct fuel, as well as in the production of biodiesel, livestock feed, pet food, soap, detergent, cosmetics, and industrial chemicals.

Since 2002, an increasing number of European Union countries have prohibited the inclusion of recycled vegetable oil from catering in animal feed. Used cooking oils from food manufacturing, however, as well as fresh or unused cooking oil, continue to be used in their animal feed.

== Shelf life ==
Due to their susceptibility to oxidation from exposure to oxygen, heat and light, resulting in the formation of oxidation products, such as peroxides and hydroperoxides, plant oils rich in polyunsaturated fatty acids have a limited shelf-life.

== Product labeling ==
In Canada, palm oil is one of five vegetable oils, along with palm kernel oil, coconut oil, peanut oil, and cocoa butter, which must be specifically named in the list of ingredients for a food product. Also, oils in Canadian food products that have been modified or hydrogenated must contain the word "modified" or "hydrogenated" when listed as an ingredient. A mix of oils other than the aforementioned exceptions may simply be listed as "vegetable oil" in Canada; however, if the food product is a cooking oil, salad oil or table oil, the type of oil must be specified and listing "vegetable oil" as an ingredient is not acceptable.

From December 2014, all food products produced in the European Union were legally required to indicate the specific vegetable oil used in their manufacture, following the introduction of the Food Information to Consumers Regulation.

== See also ==
- Algaculture
- Cholesterol
- Decorticator
- Deodorizer
- Essential oils
- Fatty acid
- Fatty acid methyl ester
- Food extrusion
- Fragrance oil
- Lipid
- List of macerated oils
- List of vegetable oils
- Neem
- Non-food crops
- Oleochemistry
- Seed oil misinformation
- Soap
- Vernonia oil
- Vegetable oil recycling

== Sources ==
This article incorporates text from a free content work. Licensed under CC BY-SA IGO 3.0 (license statement/permission). Text taken from World Food and Agriculture – Statistical Yearbook 2023, FAO, FAO.

This article incorporates text from a free content work. Licensed under CC BY 4.0 (license statement/permission). Text taken from World Food and Agriculture – Statistical Yearbook 2025, Food and Agriculture Organization of the United Nations.
