= Biodiesel by region =

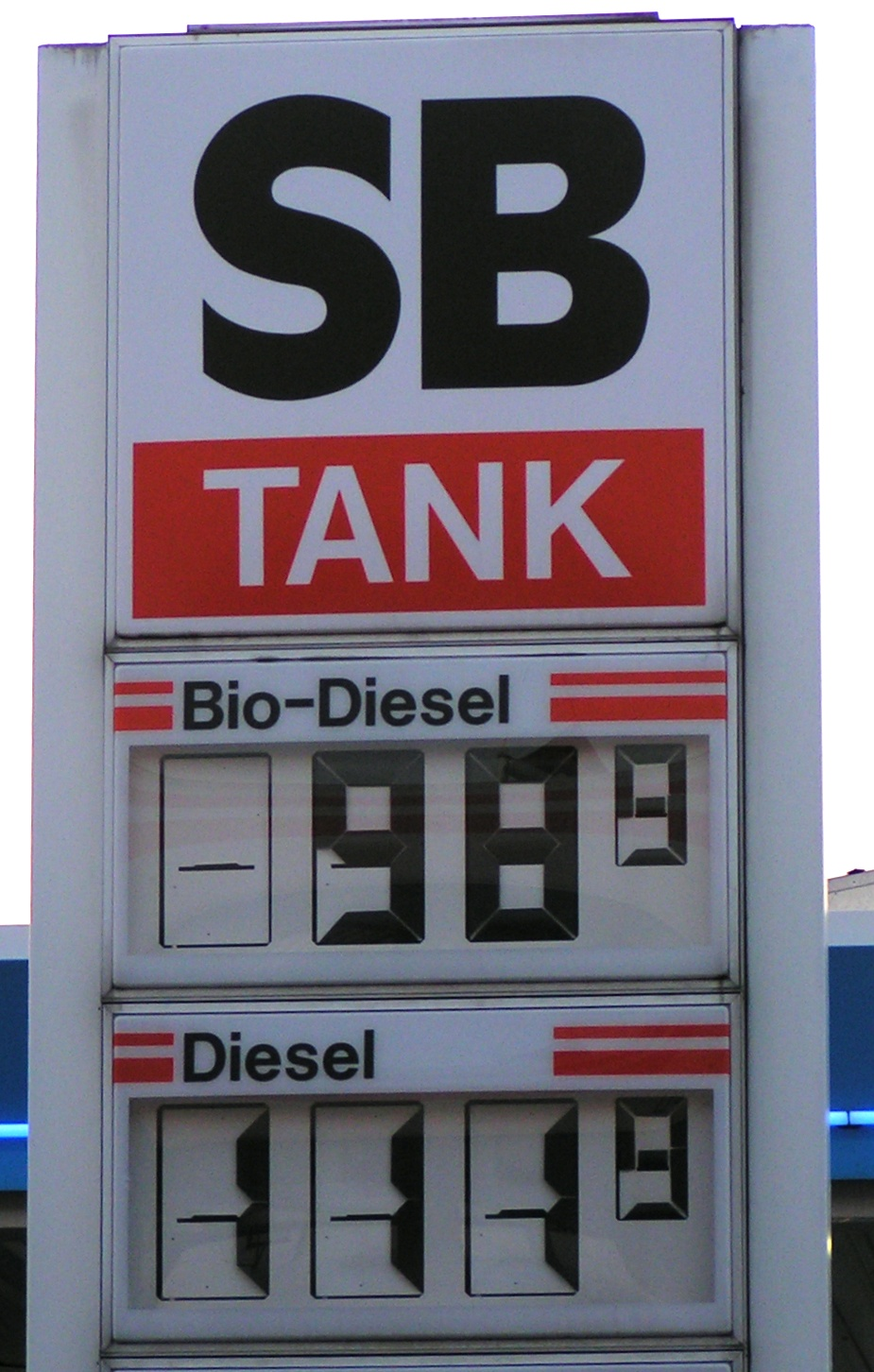
In some countries, filling stations sell bio-diesel for less than diesel from petroleum.

This article describes the use and availability of biodiesel in various countries around the world.

== Argentina ==
Argentina’s biodiesel industries are booming as a result of domestic demand along with strong export markets. Biodiesel production in Argentina grew from 130,000 tons in 2006 to 2.5 million tons in 2010, and it was expected to produce 3 million tons by 2011. Argentina is a net exporter of biodiesel, nearly all of which is shipped to Europe. Argentina ranks as the world’s fourth largest producer (by 2011, after Germany, France and Brazil), due to its rapidly emerging domestic market. Most of Argentina's biodiesel is B10, but some of it still comes from B7. Consumption should increase to 1.3 million tons per year but negotiations need to happen with the automotive industry first.

The Argentine biodiesel industry is mainly based on the use of soybean as feedstock. Production is geographically concentrated in the provinces of Buenos Aires and Santa Fe. Almost all major players in Argentina’s vegetable oil industry own or are constructing biodiesel plants.

== Brazil ==
Brazil opened a commercial biodiesel refinery in March 2005. It is capable of producing 12,000 m³ (3.2 million US gallons) per year of biodiesel fuel. Feedstocks can be a variety of sunflower oil, soybean oil, or castor bean oil. The finished product will be a blend of diesel fuel with 2% biodiesel and, after 2013, 5% biodiesel, both usable in unmodified diesel engines. As of 2005, there were 3 refineries and 7 that are planned to open. These three factories were capable of producing 45.6 million of liters per year.

Petrobras (the Brazilian national petroleum company) launched an innovative system, making biodiesel (called H-Bio) from the petroleum refinery. In Brazil, castor bean is the best option to make biodiesel, because it's easier to plant and costs less than soybean, sunflower or other seeds.

== Belgium ==
In Belgium, there are refineries in Ertvelde (belonging to the company Oleon) and at Feluy.

== Cambodia ==
Phnom Penh Biodiesel Cambodia started producing biodiesel in 2007 using a 100-liter biodiesel batch processor imported from Thailand. Biodiesel Cambodia focused on biodiesel production from Jatropha curcas plants. They originally worked on grass roots projects, encouraging farmers to plant Jatropha. In 2008 Biodiesel Cambodia started focusing on large scale plantations and attempted to partner with large scale land owners and investors. When oil prices crashed suddenly investors pulled out and Biodiesel Cambodia sold their production equipment and ceased operations in late 2008.

Sihanoukville in 2007 a non-profit named Planet Biodiesel Outreach Cambodia started a small scale biodiesel production plant. The biodiesel was used to operate their school bus and to provide fuel for their travel company. Their idea was to operate an environmentally friendly tour company and to use the proceeds to run a school for impoverished Cambodian children and provide food, clothing, education, school supplies and transportation free of charge. They ran their school bus on 100% biodiesel that was produced from waste vegetable oil. Planet Biodiesel Outreach Cambodia shut down in 2008 due to lack of donor funding and the inability to raise enough revenue from their tour company.

Siem Reap - In 2008 Angkor Hospital for Children decided they wanted to power their new visitor center with 100% biodiesel in an effort to be environmentally responsible. A new local NGO was formed called Naga Biofuels to produce the biodiesel from used cooking oil. Naga Biofuels worked with Angkor Hospital and also partnered with several other non-profits in Cambodia to produce biodiesel and a glycerin based soap from used cooking oil. In 2011 Naga Biofuels started working with Angkor Golf Resort and several other businesses and expanded their operations.

After 7 years of being the only biodiesel producer in Cambodia, Naga Biofuels changed their name to Naga Earth and started focusing on additional recycling projects in the Kingdom of Cambodia. As of July 2016, they currently are partnering with 25 different businesses and NGOs that are using their biodiesel.

== Canada ==
The Government of Canada exempted biodiesel from the federal excise tax on diesel in the March 2003 budget. However Government of Canada re-introduced federal excise tax on Bio-Diesel in the March 2013 budget and took effect on April 1, 2014.

- Quebec - Rothsay of Ville Ste Catherine, Quebec, produces 35,000 m³ of biodiesel per year. The shuttle bus connecting students between the two campuses of Concordia University are run solely on Biodiesel. Targray, one of the most important B99 and B100 biodiesel suppliers in North America, is headquartered in Kirkland, Quebec, an on-island suburb of Montreal.
- Nova Scotia - The Provincial Government of Nova Scotia uses biodiesel in some public buildings for heating as well as (in more isolated cases) for public transportation. Halifax Regional Municipality has converted its bus fleet to biodiesel, with a future demand of 7,500 m³ of B20 (20% biodiesel fuel mixture) to B50—reducing biodiesel content in low temperatures to avoid gelling issues—and 3,000 m³ split between B20 and B100 for building heat. The municipality forecasts a greenhouse gas reduction of over 9,000 tonnes CO_{2} equivalents (4,250 tonnes from fleet use and 5,000 tonnes from building heating) if fully implemented. Private sector uptake is slower—but not unheard of—possibly due to a lack of price differential with petroleum fuel and a lack of federal and provincial tax rebating. Ocean Nutrition Canada produces 6 million US gallons (23,000 m^{3}) of fatty acid ethyl esters annually as a byproduct of its Omega-3 fatty acid processing.
- Ontario - Great Lakes Biodiesel the Largest Producer of Biodiesel in Canada. Annual Production: 170 million liters per year. Completed and started production in October 2013.

Methes Energies Canada Inc. of Mississauga is processing out of two facilities (Sombra and Mississauga) with a production capacity of 55 million liters of biodiesel per year. Biox Corporation of Oakville is building a biodiesel processing plant in the Hamilton harbor industrial lands, due for completion in the first half of 2006. There are also a few retail filling stations selling biodiesel to motorists in Toronto and Unionville. SIL-TRI Biofuels in Hamilton also delivers B1-B100 blends in bulk for commercial users.

- Manitoba A rush of building of biodiesel plants in 2005 and 2006 started in June 2005 with Bifrost Bio-Diesel in Arborg. In addition, biodiesel is made by individuals and farmers for personal use.
- British Columbia - the cooperative association proves a successful structure for micro-economy-of-scale biodiesel production reaching the end-user. Vancouver Biodiesel Co-op, Nelson Biodiesel Co-op, WISE Energy and Island Biodiesel Co-op are notable examples.

The Canadian government has stated a goal of producing 500 million liters of biodiesel by 2010."Welcome to Canada Clean Fuels". Archived from the original on 2008-05-14.

== China ==
At least two publicly traded companies, China Clean Energy, Inc. and Gushan, manufacture and sell significant amounts of biodiesel in China.

== Costa Rica ==
Costa Rica is a large producer of crude palm oil and this has spurred interest in biodiesel. Currently several small biodiesel production projects are starting in the country. There are also biodiesel reactor manufacturers in Costa Rica which provide equipment to the Central American and Caribbean region.

== Czech Republic ==
Czech production of biodiesel was already above 60,000 m³ per year by the early 1990s and is now even larger. Many of the plants are very large, including one in Olomouc which produces almost 40,000 m³ per year. From the summer of 2004, Czech producers of biodiesel for blend receive a subsidy of roughly CEK 9.50/kg. All Škoda diesels built since 1996 are warrantied for DIN EN 590 biodiesel use.

== European Union ==
Consumption of Biodiesel in the European Union (GWh)
#		2005	2006	2007	2008	2010
1	Germany	18,003	29,447	33,800	28,819	25,993
2	France	4,003	6,855	14,121	23,501	23,532
3	Italy	2,000	1,732	1,580	6,481	15,088
4	Spain	270	629	3,012	6,036	13,803
5	United Kingdom	292	1,533	3,147	8,040	9,616
6	Poland	152	491	291	3,961	9,179
7	Austria	920	3,878	2,206	2,171	4,749
8	Portugal	2	818	1,570	1,545	3,783
9	Belgium	0	10	1,061	1,002	3,223
10	Sweden	97	523	1,195	1,511	2,035
11	Czech Republic	33	213	327	881	2,006
12	Romania	-	32	465	700	1,464
13	Greece	32	540	945	880	1,449
14	Slovakia	58	48	896	617	1,408
15	Hungary	0	4	23	942	1,357
16	Netherlands	0	172	2,559	2,349	1,101
17	Ireland	9	8	201	465	694
18	Finland	0	0	1	133	615
19	Slovenia	110	149	151	259	485
20	Luxembourg	7	6	484	482	466
21	Lithuania	87	162	489	532	404
22	Latvia	29	17	20	22	217
23	Bulgaria	n.a.	96	23	342	185
24	Cyprus	0	0	9	165	174
25	Denmark	0	0	0	0	8
-	Estonia	0	7	6	32	0
-	Malta	8	10	21	11	0
	European Union	26,110	47,380	68,602	91,880	123,035
1 toe = 11.63 MWh, n.a. =not available

According to EU Strategy for Biofuels at year 2010 target is 5.75% market share for biofuels. At year 2020 the target is 10% market share.

European standard DIN EN 14214 and DIN EN 590 describes the physical properties of diesel fuels.

The EU and environmental organization e.g. Greenpeace demand transparent criteria for sustainable biofuel production. Concern includes deforestation for oil palms in Indonesia and deforestation in Brazil.

== Finland ==
Neste Oil is producer of NExBTL renewable diesel oil. NExBTL is first renewable fuel suitable for all diesel engines in the world. Neste Oil claims EN-590 outperforms both regular diesel as well as other biodiesels on the market.

== France ==
The French government have ambitious objectives of incorporation of biofuels in fuels: 5,75% (energy value) in 2008, 7% in 2010 and 10% by 2015.

== Germany ==
According to the Union zur Förderung von Öl- und Proteinpflanzen UFOP (Union to promote oil- and protein plants), in 2006 the sale of biodiesel through German gas stations rose to 2,000,000 m³, although it is only available at privately owned filling stations and generally not available at outlets operated by major petroleum companies, such as Shell and Esso/Exxon (the petroleum companies see biodiesel as competition to their core petroleum business). In 2004, 45% of all biodiesel sales went directly to large end users, such as trucking companies.

In Germany biodiesel is, for the most part, produced from rapeseed. Sales in Germany stood at two billion litres (about 600 million US gallons (2,300,000 m^{3})) in 2006. This amount was sufficient to meet the average yearly consumption of well over 2,000,000 automobiles. Diesel engines have become increasingly popular in Germany and almost half of all newly manufactured cars are diesel powered. This is in part due to the greater efficiency of diesel engines, the desire by consumers to use environmentally friendlier technologies and lower taxes on diesel fuel that make it cheaper than gasoline.

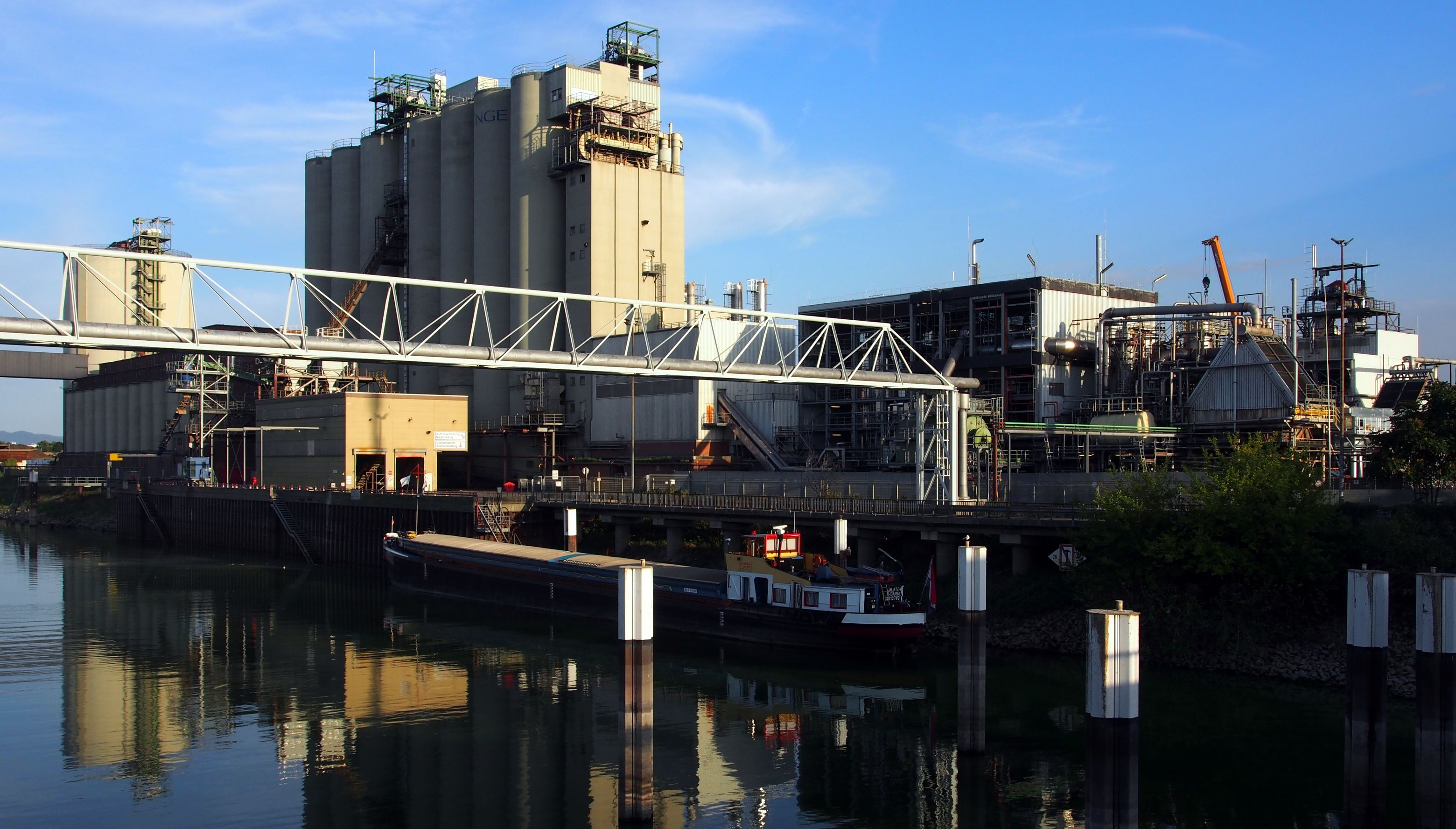
Bunge plant in Mannheim Harbour

Verbio is a biodiesel and bioethanol producer in Germany. They currently produce 400,000 tons of biodiesel from rape seed oil, soybean oil and fatty acids, selling the product to markets in the E.U.

With 1,900 sales points, equal to one in every ten public gas stations, biodiesel is the first alternative fuel to be available nationwide. The industry is expecting a surge in demand since the authorisation at the beginning of 2004, through European Union legislation, of a maximum 5% biodiesel addition to conventional diesel fuel. In Germany biodiesel is sold at a lower price than diesel from petroleum.

== Hong Kong ==
Dynamic Progress International is the largest biodiesel producer in Hong Kong, the feedstock for the biodiesel it sells locally, being used cooking oil also sourced locally. In November 2011, Dynamic Progress International was chosen in an open tendering procedure, to supply over 3.5 million litres of B5 diesel to various Hong Kong Government departments on a 16-month contract. [For more details about the Hong Kong Government contract, go to https://www.gldpcms.gov.hk/etb_prod/jsp_public/cn/scn00101.jsp then select ‘2011’ and ‘December’] Another biodiesel plant is currently under construction in Hong Kong on the Tseung Kwan O Industrial Estate by the ASB Biodiesel (Hong Kong) Limited. Upon completion, ASB Biodiesel will become the biggest biodiesel plant in Hong Kong.

== India ==
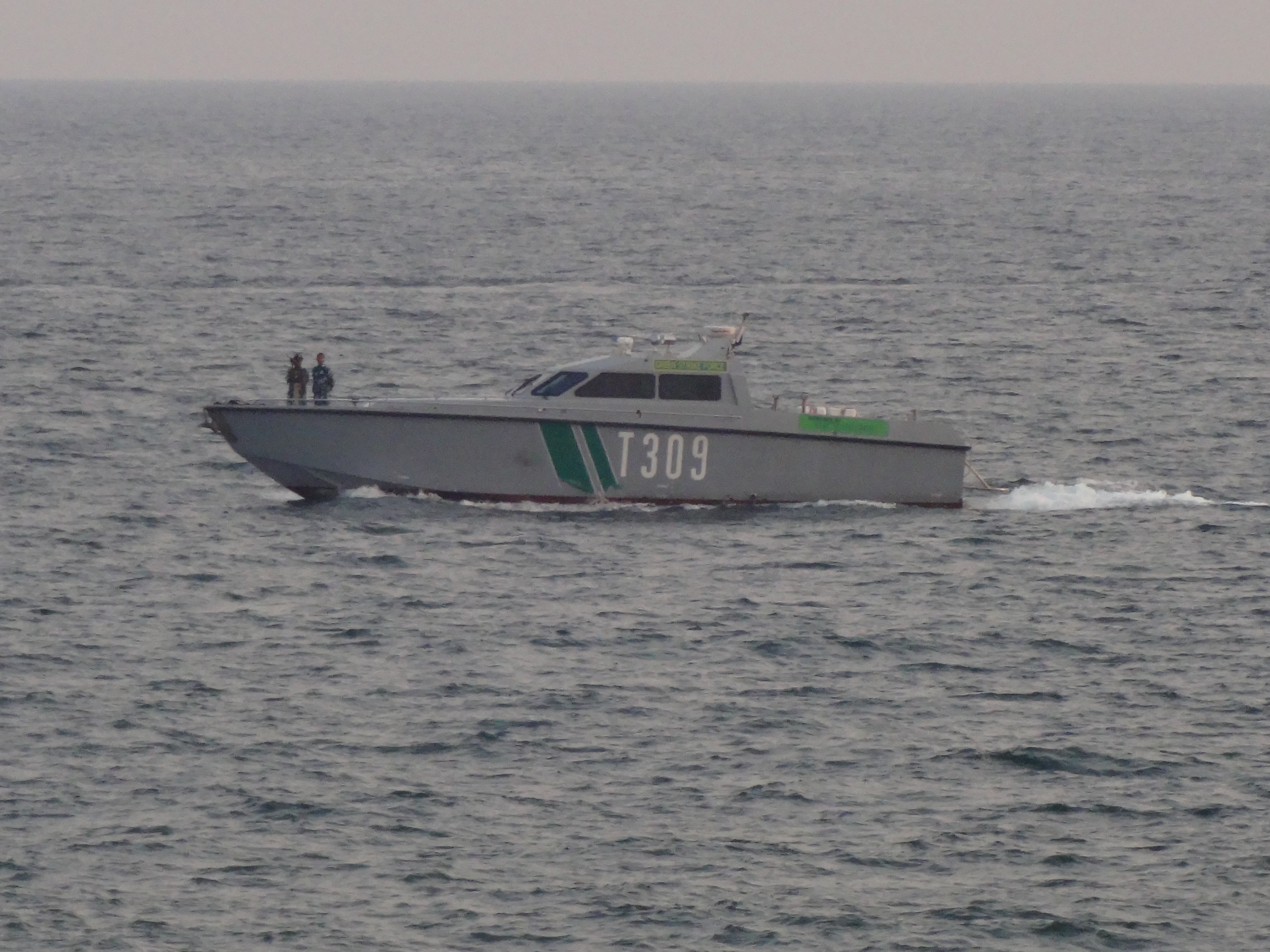
Bio Diesel Powered Fast Attack Craft Of Indian Navy

Biodiesel is now being produced locally in India for use in stationary engines and large or slow engines like those in trains, trucks and tractors. Efforts are also on to use ethanol as a substitute for petrol. Biodiesel is rapidly replacing both kerosene (which was used illegally and inefficiently) and diesel as a more efficient, cheap, and clean alternative for large engines. Today plans are being chalked out to cultivate non-edible seed oil trees such as Pongamia on barren land to use their oil for biodiesel production. The Southern Railways have been very supportive of the program and various state governments recommend planting these plants in unused areas through aid from the government sectors. Biodiesel-blends are being used to run state transport corporation buses in Karnataka. The University of Agriculture Sciences at Bangalore has identified many elite lines of Jatropha curcas and Millettia pinnata (Pongamia tree). Castor is already a well established crop in India with several very high yielding varieties in the market. Large-scale activities have been initiated quite recently. For example, the government of Karnataka has distributed several million saplings of Pongamia to farmers for planting along borders of farmland and in waste lands. Large-scale plantations have been initiated in North-East India and Jharkhand by D1 Williamson Magor Bio Fuel Limited, a joint venture between D1 Oils of U.K. and Williamson Magor of India. The hilly areas of the North-East are ideal for growing hardy, low-maintenance plants.

Indian Oil Corporation has tied up with Indian Railways to introduce biodiesel crops over 1 million square kilometers. Also, Jharkhand and Madhya Pradesh have tied up with IndianOil to cultivate large tracts of land with jatropha, the former crop of choice for Indian biodiesel plans. Jatropha is now being replaced by Pongamia and Castor due to its very (comparative) high cost of cultivation. In order to organize the industry, the BioDiesel Society of India has been formed to encourage energy plantations for increasing feedstock supplies.

== Indonesia ==
Since September 2005, the Eterindo Group has been producing biodiesel using palm oil. Currently the production capacity of the Eterindo Group has reached 120,000 tonnes of Biodiesel annually. Meeting the standard requirements of ASTM D-6751 and EN 14214, in 2006 the group begin to export its biodiesel to United States, Germany and Japan. It is now exploring another export destinations, i.e.: Asia Pacific countries, etc. It is expected that biodiesel production of Indonesia will reach more than 3.5 million tons in 2018.

== Italy ==
Italy has the capacity to produce over 2,711 million litres of biodiesel each year, but due to competition from imports, production has decreased to about 500,000 tonnes in 2012. Consumption was 1,681 million litres in 2011, and was expected to be 1,573 million litres in 2012.

== Lithuania ==
There are two biodiesel producing plants in Lithuania. One in close to Mažeikiai (Samogitia) and other in Klaipėda free economic zone. Most of biodiesel produced in Lithuania is consumed at the local market and a fraction exported.

== Malawi ==
Bio Energy Resources Ltd. of Malawi announced in May 2011 that it would construct a USD 18 million plant with an annual production capacity of 20 million liters which were to process the seeds of Jatropha Curcas into Straight Vegetable Oils, which were to be blended with diesel to make bio-fuel and with paraffin to make bio-paraffin. The production facility was commissioned in 2013 and had a production capacity of 5,000 liters per day.

The Malawi Energy Regulatory Authority and the Malawi Bureau of Standards have been involved in product quality, prices and licensing, and by the start of 2015 the company Bio Energy Resources was given a pre-permit approval for production and distribution of jatropha-based diesel. By August 2010 a total of 9 million Jatropha trees had been planted, and "38.000 small scale farmers [were] enrolled".

== Malaysia ==
The biodiesel industry has been identified as one of the 12 National Key Economic Activities (NKEA) under the Tenth Malaysia Plan.

Projects requiring Malaysian and Indonesian palm oil as feedstocks have been criticized by some environmental advocates. Friends of the Earth has published a report asserting that clearance of forests for oil-palm plantations is threatening some of the last habitat of the orangutan. Also, in a column for The Guardian, writer George Monbiot claimed that land clearance by cutting and burning large forest trees frees large amounts of carbon dioxide that is never reabsorbed by the smaller oil palms. If true, then biodiesel production from plantation-grown palm oil may be a net source of atmospheric carbon dioxide. How these issues are resolved may determine whether Malaysia eventually becomes a major producer of biodiesel.

The palm oil industry has recognized this concerned and in conjunction with the WWF has formed the Roundtable on Sustainable Palm Oil (RSPO) which endeavours to ensure development of palm oil in a sustainable way. In 2014, after many delays Malaysia began the introduction in the sale of B5 biodiesel in most petrol stations in the country. This would be eventually replaced by B7 and finally B10 biodiesel blends in late 2015.

== Pakistan ==
In Pakistan Biodiesel has been launched by Pakistan State Oil in the Sindh province. Although details about the Biodeisel are still cloudy as there was almost no media campaign, the mix used is E10.

Currently ethanol is being derived from Sugar Mills, that produce it as a by product and in many cases, use it to power their own mills.

== Spain ==
It is possible to buy biodiesel, mixed with diesel fuel, in more than 480 petrol stations around the country.

== Singapore ==
Two biodiesel plants will be built on Jurong Island, Singapore's petrochemicals hub. The first plant, by Peter Cremer (S) GMBH, will have a capacity of 200,000 tons/year and it is expected to be ready by early 2007, while the second is a joint venture between Wilmar Holdings and Archer Daniels Midland Company, to be operational by end 2006 with an initial capacity of 150,000 tons/year.

Natural Fuel Pte Ltd., has mechanically completed a 600,000 tons/year biodiesel plant in early 2008 - making it one of the world's largest biodiesel located in a single site.

Singapore was selected for the companies' first biodiesel plant in Asia because of its excellent connectivity. There is easy access to abundant palm oil feedstock from the neighboring countries of Malaysia and Indonesia. Also, Singapore has terminal facilities which allow the biodiesel to be shipped to markets around the world.

Neste Oil is building NExBTL renewable diesel oil plant, production 800,000 tons/year. According plan it will be ready 2010.

== Thailand ==
Thailand was the first country to launch biodiesel as a national program on July 10, 2001. It was reported that the work was initiated by the Royal Chitralada Project, a royal -sponsored project to help rural farmers . International co-operation among ASEAN country was also starting by the Renewable Energy Institute of Thailand (Dr. Samai Jai-In) and Asia-Pacific Roundtable for Sustainable consumption and Production (Dr. Olivia Castillo, ). The primary aims of the project in Thailand are:

- an alternative output for excess agricultural produce
- substituting diesel imports

In 2007, several biodiesel plants are operating in Thailand using the excess palm oil / palm stearin and in some cases, waste vegetable oil as raw materials. The production capacity is about 1 million litre/day and should reach 2 million litre by early 2008. About 400 petrol stations are now distributing B5 (5% biodiesel with 95% diesel) in Chiangmai and Bangkok. The national biodiesel standard has been developed based on the European standard. The target of the Government is to mandate B2 by 2 April 2008 and to increase to B5 by 2011 which will require almost 4 Million litres/day of biodiesel.

The raw material will most likely come from palm oil, coconut oil, Jatropha Curcas Linn, and tallow. Several pilot plants are now operating such as the Royal Chitralada Projects , Rajabiodiesel in Surattani , Department of Alternative Energy Development and Efficiency, Royal Naval Dockyard, MTEC , and Tistr [www.tistr.or.th].

== United Kingdom ==
Biodiesel is sold by a small but growing number of filling stations in B5 and B100 blend, including a significant fraction of supermarket filling stations. Some farmers have also been using small plants to create their own biodiesel for farm machinery since the 1990s. Several Co-ops and small-scale production facilities have recently begun production, typically selling fuel several pence per litre less than petrodiesel. The first large-scale plant, capable of producing 50 million litres (13 million US gallons) a year, opened in Scotland in 2005, soon followed by a large plant co-owned by Tesco and Greenergy (Tesco sell 5% biodiesel at many of their petrol stations. The Fuel conforms to standard EN590 which allows up to 5% biodiesel inclusion). Biodiesel is treated like any other vehicle fuel in the UK and the paperwork required to register as a producer is a major limiting factor to growth in the market. Although since July 2007 home users may produce 2500 litres per year for personal use without registering or paying duty.

== United States ==
Biodiesel is commercially available in most oilseed-producing states in the United States. As of 2005, it is somewhat more expensive than fossil diesel, though it is still commonly produced in relatively small quantities (in comparison to petroleum products and ethanol). Many farmers who raise oilseeds use a biodiesel blend in tractors and equipment as a matter of policy, to foster production of biodiesel and raise public awareness. It is sometimes easier to find biodiesel in rural areas than in cities. Similarly, some agribusinesses and others with ties to oilseed farming use biodiesel for public relations reasons. As of 2003 some tax credits were available in the U.S. for using biodiesel. In 2004 almost 30 million US gallons (110,000 m^{3}) of commercially produced biodiesel were sold in the U.S., up from less than 0.1 million US gallons (380 m^{3}) in 1998. Projections for 2005 were 75 million US gallons (280,000 m^{3}) produced from 45 factories and 150 million US gallons (570,000 m^{3}). Due to increasing pollution control requirements and tax relief, the U.S. market is expected to grow to 1 billion US gallons (3,800,000 m^{3}) or 2 billion US gallons (7,600,000 m^{3}) by 2010.

== Uruguay ==
Uruguayan law 18.195 stipulates a minimum of 2% of biodiesel in diesel since January 2009 and 5% from January 2012. As of March 2009, state fuel monopoly ANCAP pretends to start blending biodiesel for automotive use in late May or early June 2009.

== See also ==
- Biofuels by region
- National Biodiesel Board
- Grays Harbor Biodiesel Plant
- Biodiesel producers
