= Fine to Flush =

UK certification for flushable wet wipes

Fine to Flush was a certification for flushable wet wipes in the United Kingdom. Wet wipes that met certain criteria deemed capable of breaking down in the sewerage systems were allowed to have the text "Fine to Flush" on their packaging. It was introduced in 2019 by Water UK in response to the problem of consumers flushing non-flushable wet wipes down the toilet, despite often being labelled as "flushable", which contributed to the creation of fatbergs and sewer blockages. Products labelled as "Fine to Flush" were tested to make sure they did not contribute to these issues.

The "Fine to Flush" labelling was criticised for confusing consumers, suggesting that they could flush too many wipes down the toilet at once, and suggesting that they could flush non-flushable wipes. The labelling was discontinued in 2024 and replaced by a Water UK campaign to "Bin the Wipe".

== Background ==
As of 2019, Water UK reports that there are 300,000 sewer blockages per year in the United Kingdom, resulting in expenses of £100 million. Water UK says that 93 per cent of these blockages are caused by wet wipes that are labelled as being flushable, but do not break down in the sewerage system. These can cause fatbergs, made of fat, grease, and wet wipes, which can block sewers. In some cases they can be hundreds of metres long and removing them can take months. Before the introduction of Fine to Flush, the water industry had been advocating for a solution to wet wipe manufacturers stating that their wet wipes were flushable on the packaging, despite the fact that they would not break down. The advocates wanted to make it clearer to consumers whether or not certain wet wipes were fine to flush.

== Usage ==
Wet wipes that met the Fine to Flush standard displayed a blue logo with a tick and the text "Fine to Flush" in all caps. These wet wipes were shown to break down in the sewerage system and did not contain plastic. Wipes labelled with "Fine to Flush" were only ones that would be used instead of toilet paper, such as baby wipes, but not other types of wipes such as cleaning wipes. Fine to Flush is Water UK's Water Industry Specification WIS 4-02-06. The wipe products were tested by WRc. It was reported in 2019 that testing if products meet the Fine to Flush standard could cost up to £8,000.

== History ==
The Fine to Flush standard and label were introduced in 2019. The first wet wipe product to meet the standard was made by Natracare. In 2022, BBC News reported that several water companies wanted the "Fine to Flush" labelling to be discontinued, as it confused consumers. The label suggested to consumers that they could flush as many wet wipes down the toilet as they wished per flush, but "Fine to Flush" labelling often only allowed for one wet wipe to be flushed at a time. The director of Yorkshire Water also said that several brands labelled "Fine to Flush" did not break down in the sewers, and often contained plastic.

In March 2024 Water UK stopped using the "Fine to Flush" labels because of the confusion it caused, with consumers flushing all types of wipes down the toilet, including ones that were not deemed flushable. Water UK began a "Bin the Wipe" campaign to encourage consumers to put all kinds of wipes into rubbish bins rather than flushing them down the toilet.

== See also ==
- Greenwashing
