= Natracare =

British feminine hygiene brand

- Industry: Feminine hygiene
- Founded: 1989; 37 years ago
- Founders: Susie Hewson
- Headquarters: Bristol, England, United Kingdom
- Products: Tampons sanitary pads
- Website: natracare.com

Natracare is a British feminine hygiene brand that produces organic and plastic-free menstrual products, including tampons, sanitary pads and panty liners.

Natracare was founded in 1989 by Susie Hewson. She decided to start the company after watching a television documentary about the environmental impact of dioxins. She arranged a £90,000 overdraft from NatWest. According to Hewson, established feminine hygiene companies tried to discredit research into the health risks of chemicals in menstrual products and engaged in a campaign of "harassment in the media and sending lawyers' letters". In 1996, the company was the first to produce certified organic cotton tampons. The company started producing wet wipes that may be safely flushed down the toilet in 2019. Hewson was awarded an MBE in the 2023 Birthday Honours.

Natracare is part of Bodywise (UK) Ltd, and is headquartered in Bristol. Natracare tampons are plastic-free, made with organic cotton, bioplastics and cardboard applicators that are biodegradable. A 1994 study found that Natracare tampons produced no measurable amounts of the superantigen TSST-1, which causes toxic shock syndrome.

Since 2019, Natracare has been a member of One Percent for the Planet. Natracare was the first non-food product to receive a Korean LOHAS certification. Natracare's makeup removal wipes have received COSMOS certification. The company's wet wipes were the first product to qualify to use Water UK's "fine to flush" symbol. Natracare won The Queen's Awards for Enterprise for export in 2018.

As part of its Project #BeKind campaign, Natracare partnered with the United Kingdom charity Social Farms and Gardens in 2023 for composting trials of its products. Natracare's advertising campaigns have included influencer marketing.
