= Food safety incidents in China =

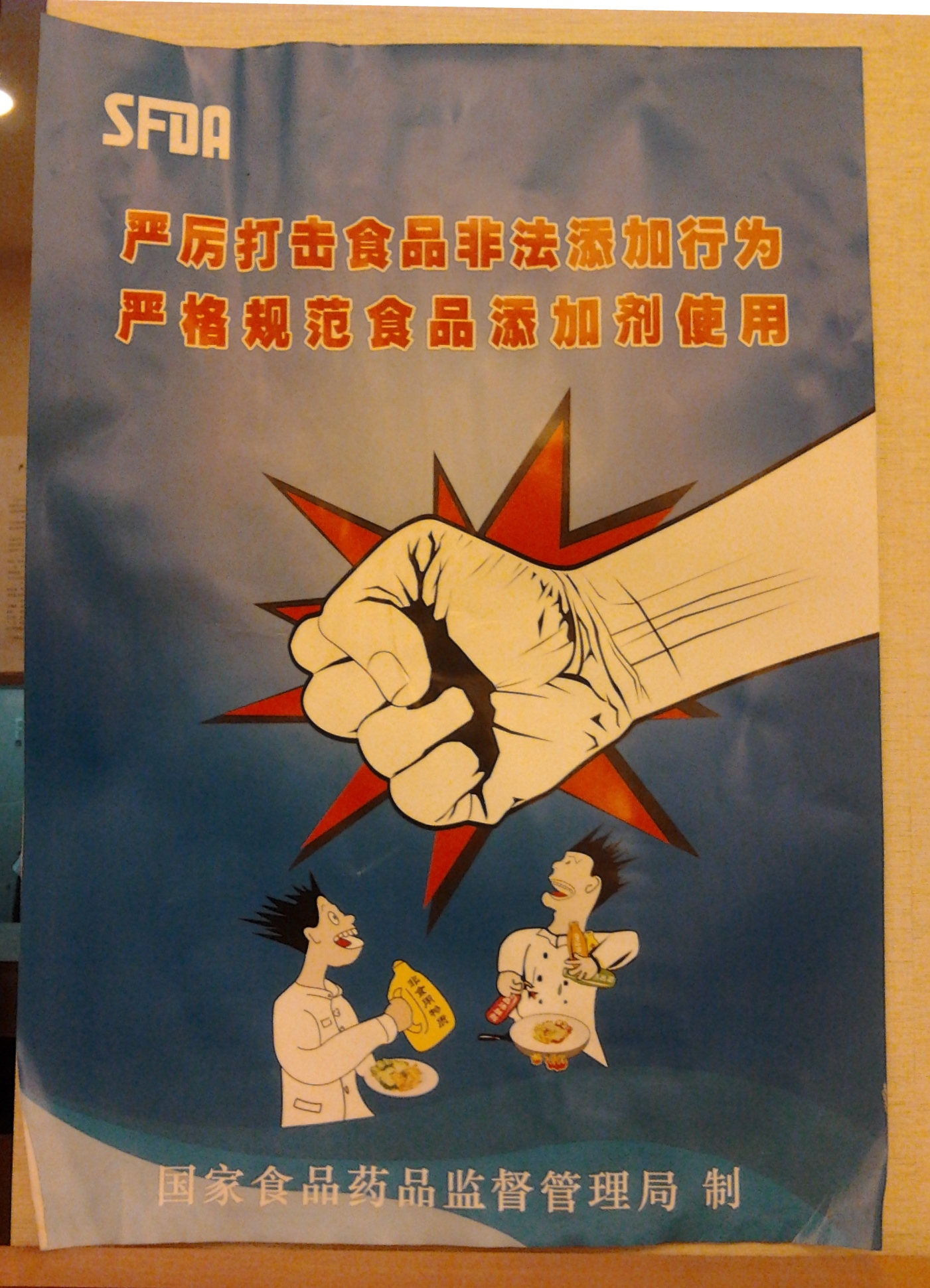
"SFDA is cracking down on illegal food additives and strictly regulating their usage"

Food safety incidents in China have received increased international media scrutiny following the reform and opening of the country, and its joining the World Trade Organization. Urban areas have become more aware of food safety as their incomes rise. Food safety agencies in China have overlapping duties. The 2008 Chinese milk scandal and COVID-19 pandemic received the most international attention among food safety incidents.

== Food safety incidents in 2002 ==
=== Chemical brighteners in mushrooms ===
From around 2002 to 2012, chemical brighteners were used by many Chinese farmers to enhance the appearance of their white mushrooms. This illegal use was mostly eliminated by the Chinese Ministry of Agriculture.

== Food safety incidents in 2003 ==
=== Poisonous Jinhua ham ===
In 2003, several small producers of Jinhua hams (from Jinhua, Zhejiang) operated out of season and produced hams during warmer months, treating their hams with pesticides to prevent spoilage and insect infestation. The hams were soaked in the pesticide dichlorvos, which is a volatile organophosphate insecticide used for fumigation.

== Food safety incidents in 2004 ==
=== Counterfeit baby formula ===
In April, at least 13 babies in Fuyang, Anhui, and 50–60 more in rural areas of Anhui died of malnourishment from ingesting fake powdered milk. In addition, 100–200 other babies in the province suffered malnutrition but survived. Local officials in Fuyang arrested 47 people who were responsible for making and selling the fake formula and investigators discovered 45 types of substandard formula for sale in Fuyang markets. Over 141 factories were responsible for the production of the formula and Chinese officials seized 2,540 bags of fake formula by mid-April. The State Food and Drug Administration ordered an investigation in May, 2004.

Within three days of ingesting the formula, the babies suffered from what Chinese doctors described as "big head disease", since the babies' heads swelled while their bodies became thinner from malnourishment. The fake formulas were tested to have only 1–6% protein when the national requirement was 10% protein. The government promised to compensate families and help cover medical bills. Most of the victims were from rural families.

=== Adulterated pickled vegetables ===
In June 2004, the Chengdu Quality Inspection Department released figures that only about 23% of all pickled vegetables produced in Chengdu, Sichuan, had an acceptable amount of chemical additives. The labels on the pickled vegetables that were supposed to indicate the chemical content were also found to be inaccurate. In Sichuan, the factories had been using industrial-grade salt to pickle the vegetables and had been spraying the pesticide DDVP on the pickled vegetables before shipment.

=== Counterfeit alcoholic drinks ===
In spring 2004, four men died of alcohol poisoning in Guangdong and eight other men were hospitalized in the People's Hospital of Guangzhou. Wang Funian and Hou Shangjian, both from Taihe Town, died in May after drinking liquor bought from the same vendor. Two other men, one a migrant worker, died the previous night in Zhongluotan in Hunan. Authorities in the local health department suspected that the makers of the fake liquor blended industrial alcohol and rice wine, and closed several unlicensed liquor manufacturers.

=== Soy sauce made from human hair ===
Stories began circulating in the press about cheap soy sauces made from human hair. These sauces were manufactured in China using a chemical amino acid extraction process similar to artificially hydrolyzed soy sauces and then quietly exported to other countries. An investigative report that aired on Chinese television exposed the unsanitary and potentially contaminated sources of the hair:

When asking how the amino acid syrup (or powder) was generated, the manufacturer replied that the powder was generated from human hair. Because the human hair was gathered from salon[s], barbershop[s] and hospitals around the country, it was unhygienic and mixed with condoms, used hospital cottons, used menstrual cycle pad[s], used syringe[s], etc.

In response, the Chinese government banned production of soy sauces made from hair. Other carcinogens remain; see 3-MCPD.

== Food safety incidents in 2005 ==
=== Sudan I red dye ===
In 1996, China banned food manufacturers from using Sudan I red dye to color their products. China followed a number of other developed nations in banning the dye due to its links to cancer and other negative health effects. However, officials in the General Administration of Quality Supervision, Inspection and Quarantine, the State Bureau of Industry and Commerce, and the State Food and Drug Administration discovered in 2005 that Sudan I was being used in food in many major Chinese cities. In Beijing, the Heinz Company added the red dye to chili sauce; in Guangdong, Zhejiang, Hunan, and Fujian, the red dye was discovered in vegetables and noodles. Kentucky Fried Chicken (KFC) used the red dye in its 1,200 restaurants, and medicine in Shanghai also contained Sudan I.

Before the year 2005, companies in China had been using Sudan I illegally, and government officials gave two reasons why the 1996 ban had not been adequately enforced. The first reason was that there were too many agencies overseeing food production, creating loopholes and inefficiency. The second reason was that the government agencies were not equipped or trained with the food testing equipment that could have detected the dye earlier. Officials announced that they would begin to reform the food safety system on national and local levels.

== Food safety incidents in 2006 ==
=== Counterfeit drugs ===
The State Food and Drug Administration reported that their officials had resolved 14 cases involving fake drugs and 17 cases involving "health accidents" at drug manufacturing facilities. One of these incidents involved fake Armillarisin A; ten people injected with the fake drug died in May 2006. The drug quality inspectors at the factory that produced the Armillarisin A drugs failed to notice that the chemical diglycol had been added to drugs. In July, 2006, six people died and 80 more became sick after ingesting an antibiotic with disinfectant as an ingredient. In 2006, the government also "revoked the business licenses of 160 drug manufacturers and retailers."

=== School food poisoning ===
On September 1, 2006, more than 300 students at Chongzhou Experimental Primary School in Chongzhou, Sichuan, got food poisoning after lunch. Of those, approximately 200 students had to be hospitalized due to headaches, fevers, vomiting, and diarrhea. The school was temporarily closed for an investigation. On the same day, middle school students in Liaoning also got food poisoning after eating dinner at school. The Ministry of Education ordered an investigation, and officials suspected that the cause of the food poisoning was unsanitary conditions at the schools. During summer vacation, the schools had not been cleaned or disinfected, and the pupils might have been exposed to unsanitary food or drinking water when they returned in September.

=== Contaminated turbot fish ===
In late 2006, officials in Shanghai and Beijing discovered illegal amounts of chemicals in turbot. Shanghai officials from the Shanghai Food and Drug Administration found carcinogenic nitrofuran metabolites in the fish and Beijing found additional drugs, including malachite green, in its fish. Other cities, including Hangzhou, Zhejiang, have begun testing turbot fish and banning the turbot shipped from Shandong. Many restaurants in Shanghai, Beijing, and Hong Kong stopped purchasing turbot after officials discovered the high amounts of illegal antibiotics.

=== Pesticide residue on vegetables ===
In early 2006, Greenpeace tested vegetables in two Hong Kong grocery stores, and discovered that only 30% of their samples contained acceptable amounts of pesticide residue. Some of the 70 percent failing the tests tested positive for illegal pesticides, such as DDT, HCH and Lindane. Greenpeace explained that nearly 80% of vegetables in these grocery stores originated from mainland China. John Chapple, manager of Sinoanalytica, a Qingdao-based food analysis laboratory, supplemented Greenpeace's information. He was not surprised by the findings and explained that farmers in China have little knowledge of correct pesticide use.
Although many Chinese farms are converting to organic agriculture, pesticide use in many areas remains high.

=== Infected snail meat ===
In June, July, and August 2006, the Shuguo Yanyi Restaurant in Beijing served raw Amazonian snail meat and, as a result, 70 diners were diagnosed with angiostrongylus meningitis. The snail meat contained Angiostrongylus cantonensis, "a parasite that harms people's nervous system" causing headaches, vomiting, stiff necks, and fevers. No one died from the meningitis outbreak and the Beijing Municipal Office of Health inspection did not find any more raw snails in 2,000 other restaurants. However, the Beijing Municipal Office of Health prohibited restaurants from serving raw or half-cooked snails and disciplined the Shuguo Yanyi Restaurant. The Beijing Friendship Hospital, where the first meningitis case was treated, began a program to educate doctors on the treatment of angiostrongylus meningitis. The Guangzhou Center for Disease Control and Prevention explained that these meningitis cases were the first outbreaks since the 1980s.

=== Poisonous mushrooms ===
In December 2006, sixteen diners were hospitalized after eating a poisonous variety of boletus mushrooms in Beijing at the Dayali Roast Duck Restaurant. The mushrooms caused nausea, vomiting, and dizziness and the ill diners were treated at the Bo'ai Hospital and the 307 Hospital of the People's Liberation Army.

In November 2006, Chinese authorities at the Ministry of Health had warned of the rising number of mushroom poisonings. "From July to September, 31 people were killed and 183 were poisoned by toxic mushrooms." Officials worried that the public could not accurately separate edible mushrooms from poisonous ones.

== Food safety incidents in 2007 ==
=== Counterfeit drugs ===
According to John Newton of Interpol, Chinese organized crime is involved in working across national boundaries and faking drugs on an industrial scale, now appearing throughout Africa. China Central Television cited an official saying those making the false albumin were making a 300% profit, assisted by shortages of the genuine product.

=== Alleged carcinogenic effects of frying oil reuse ===
In March 2007, the Guangzhou-based Information Times reported that Kentucky Fried Chicken (KFC) restaurants in several cities in Shaanxi utilized magnesium trisilicate to extract impurities from frying oil, allowing it to be reused repeatedly for up to ten days. It was alleged that such repeated reuse of cooking oil could lead to a buildup of potentially carcinogenic byproducts such as acrylamide. KFC defended their practices as compliant with national food safety standards, and pointed out that the additive is considered safe by United States and international standards. Nonetheless, health officials in Xianyang, Yulin, and Xi'an, inspected local KFC outlets and confiscated stocks of the chemical, and the Shaanxi provincial health administration requested that the Ministry of Health step in. Officials in Guangzhou also began an investigation into the frying oils.

The Ministry of Health conducted tests at six KFC outlets, which showed that their use of magnesium trisilicate in filters used to purify cooking oil had no apparent impact on health.

Magnesium trisilicate is commonly used in medicines such as antacids, and is widely considered to be safe for human consumption with no known connections to cancer.

=== Contaminated wheat gluten and rice protein used for export ===
In May 2007, the General Administration of Quality Supervision, Inspection, and Quarantine (AQSIQ) confirmed that two domestic companies had exported melamine-contaminated wheat gluten and rice protein blamed for the deaths of dogs and cats in the United States. In August 2007, AQSIQ introduced recall systems for unsafe food products and toys and on December 3, 2007, China ordered 69 categories of products to be bar-coded at factories amid efforts to improve product safety, in response to several recent incidents, including: "scares rang[ing] from ducks and hens that were fed cancer-causing Sudan Red dye to make their egg yolks red, to pet food made of melamine-tainted wheat protein that killed scores of dogs and cats in the United States." See also 2007 pet food crisis.

=== Sewage used in tofu manufacturing ===
Close to a hundred manufacturers of stinky tofu in Guangdong were found to use a combination of sewage, slop, and iron(II) sulfate to accelerate production and improve appearance of their fermented product.

The waste water produced by the tofu industries also has effects on the environment.

=== Cardboard bun hoax ===
The cardboard bun hoax was a falsified news report broadcast in July 2007 on Beijing Television's BTV-7 (the Lifestyle Channel). In the report, footage implied that local vendors were selling pork buns, a common breakfast food, filled with a composite of 60% caustic soda-soaked cardboard and 40% fatty pork. Coming after several real and highly publicized food safety incidents in China, the report was widely believed and sparked public outrage.

== Food safety incidents in 2008 ==
=== Tainted Chinese dumplings ===
In January 2008, several Japanese people in the Hyōgo and Chiba prefectures fell ill after consuming Chinese-produced jiaozi (dumplings) tainted with the insecticide methamidophos. The dumplings had been produced by the Tianyang Food Plant in Hebei and sold by JT Foods and the Japanese Consumers' Co-operative Union. Kyodo News reported that about 500 people complained of symptoms such as nausea and stomach pain. On February 5, 2008, Hyōgo and Chiba prefectural police departments announced that they were treating these cases as attempted murder, establishing a joint investigation team.

When Japanese police and other prefectural authorities inspected the recalled dumplings, they found pesticides other than methamidophos, including dichlorvos and parathion. The Japanese National Police Agency found these toxins in packages that were completely sealed, concluding that it would have been nearly impossible to insert such toxins into the packages from the outside. They provided the test results to the Ministry of Public Security of China (MPS).

Investigations jointly held by both the Chinese and Japanese governments cleared the Chinese company of responsibility after finding no traces of any poison in the raw material used nor in the factory. Officials are now treating this incident as a deliberate poisoning, and an investigation is underway. On February 28, 2008, the MPS criminal investigation bureau announced that there was little chance that methamidophos had been put into the dumplings in China, and declared that the Japanese police had rejected the requirement by the MPS to check the scene, relative material evidences, and test reports, thus information on the evidence was not fully provided to the MPS. On the same day, Hiroto Yoshimura, the Commissioner-General of Japan's National Police Agency, argued against the Chinese authorities that the Japanese had already offered test results and photographic evidence and claimed that some part of China's assertion "cannot be overlooked". They asked Chinese authorities to offer evidence.

On August 5, 2008, Japanese media revealed that some Chinese people who had eaten the recalled Chinese dumplings made by Tianyang Food had also become sick after the incident in Japan, in mid-June 2008; the cause was again found to have been methamidophos contamination. The Chinese government alerted the Japanese government to this fact just before the 34th G8 summit in July 2008. The Yomiuri Shimbun reported that this incident has increased the suspicion of foods produced in China.

=== Contaminated powdered ginger ===
In July 2008, it was announced that the Whole Foods supermarket chain in the United States had been selling powdered ginger produced in China, which was labeled as organic food, but when tested was found to contain the banned pesticide aldicarb. The ginger had been mistakenly certified organic by Quality Assurance International, who relied on two Chinese certifiers because, under Chinese law, foreigners may not inspect Chinese farms.

=== Contaminated baby formula ===
In September 2008, a fresh outbreak of kidney disease occurred, due to baby formula contaminated by melamine. Melamine was deliberately added to fool quality testing intended to measure protein content, which was implemented after the 2004 incident where babies died of malnutrition due to baby formula being watered down too much. Six babies died and 54,000 were made sick by the melamine-tainted formula with 51,900 requiring hospitalization. The supplier of the milk, Sanlu Group, is a name brand and is a major player in the industry in China. The company is said to have known of the problem for months, but claims the contaminant came from milk suppliers.

=== Contaminated egg products ===
In October 2008 news emerged that certain egg products produced by Hanwei Group were also contaminated with melamine.

== Food safety incidents in 2009 ==
=== Plastic tapioca pearls ===
Tapioca pearls used for bubble tea were adulterated with macromolecular polymers to improve their texture.

=== Pesticide in mantou ===
To improve the chewiness and texture of mantou (steamed buns) the pesticide dichlorvos was added.

=== Fake lamb meat ===
Businesses in Qingdao, Shandong, have been caught marinating duck meat in goat or sheep urine to give the duck the smell and taste of lamb. The duck is then sold as lamb to customers.

=== Formaldehyde-laced blood pudding ===
Inspectors in Wuhan, Hubei, discovered that most of the pork blood pudding in Chinese markets contained little actual blood, but rather, was manufactured with formaldehyde, corn starch, industrial grade salt, artificial food colourings, and a variety of other additives.

== Food safety incidents in 2010 ==
=== Gutter oil ===
The practice of using recycled, toxic "gutter oil" as cooking fat was brought to wider attention in 2010.

=== Dyed green beans ===
Hunan police shut down various underground workshops that produced fake green beans by mixing soybeans with various chemical additives.

== Food safety incidents in 2011 ==
=== Adulterated noodles ===
Seventeen noodle makers in Dongguan city, Guangdong province, alleged to have included ink, industrial dyes, and paraffin wax in the manufacture of noodles normally made from sweet potatoes in order to lower costs.

== Food safety incidents in 2012 ==
=== Contaminated strawberries ===
In October 2012, frozen Chinese strawberries contaminated with norovirus infected over 11,000 children in Germany.

=== Aflatoxin-tainted baby formula ===
In the city of Guangzhou, authorities conducted health tests on over 610 batches of infant formula. Six samples failed the inspection. In response to this, Hunan Ava Dairy Company recalled five of the products.

=== Inaccuracies in reporting food safety incidents ===
In the end of the year, a comprehensive report uses 12 food safety incidents, in which one was only deemed to be an actual food safety incident. One problem in understanding China's food safety problem is an inaccurate understanding to food safety and how much information is actually disclosed. The report explains that news is often confused with food safety. News reports do not determine how good food safety is and does not determine what the truth is. What the study finds lacking about food safety is that it is not consistent in maintaining food safety in China. In regards to information, there is a serious discrepancy with how information is shared and how much is requested by the public. Of the 43 largest cities in China, only 23% of information regarding food safety is actually reported.

== Food safety incidents in 2013 ==
=== Pork meat scandal ===
By March 2013, over 15,000 dead pigs had been found drifting down Huangpu River, caused by a crack-down on illicit pig-trade in Zhejiang. As reported by Shanghaiist, local pork dealers would buy up dead meat unfit for sale, process it in illegal workshops, and then re-introduce the products into the legal market.

=== Lamb meat scandal ===
In May 2013, the Ministry of Public Security released a press statement warning Shanghai consumers of lamb meat that inadvertently may have been, or contained, rat, fox or mink meat. According to some sources, respective fake lamb meat also reached Yum-owned "Little Sheep" hot pot chain restaurants, though Yum itself declined these rumours.

=== Recycled expired food ===
In June 2013, Wenzhou police shut down 10 underground mills in Zhejiang's Cangnan County, and additionally seized large amounts of chemical additives and coloring agents, which were used to clean expired chicken drumsticks and wings, ducks' heads, and duck meat prior to re-selling them to the public.

=== Fake beef ===
In September 2013, according to JRJ and Shanghaiist six workshops near Xi'an, Shaanxi, have been shut down that produced fake beef by mixing pork with chemicals, such as paraffin wax and industrial salts.

=== Cat meat scandal ===
In October 2013, cat meat, slaughtered at a "black" slaughterhouse in Huai'an City near Shanghai, was sold to butchers and local markets under the guise of "rabbit". Some of the cats were kept alive and shipped to the southern provinces of Guangdong and Guangxi where they were sold for around 10 yuan (£1) per animal.

== Food safety incidents in 2014 ==
=== Zhu Chuanfeng scandal ===
Gutter oil is a term used in China to describe illicit cooking oil that has already been used and is then processed by cleaning and filtering to be resold as a cheaper alternative to normal cooking oil. The sources of this oil are restaurant fryers and grease traps, sewers and leftover or used oil that is sold by restaurants. A newer version of gutter oil uses discarded animal parts, animal fat, internal organs, and expired or otherwise low quality meat which is then cooked in large vats in order to extract the oil.

In January 2014, Zhu Chuanfeng was sentenced to death, and his brothers Zhu Chuanqing and Zhu Chuanbo were sentenced to life in prison for selling gutter oil.

=== Expired meat sold to global brands ===
Shanghai Husi Food Co. Ltd. supplied products containing expired meat to McDonald's, KFC, Pizza Hut, Starbucks, and Burger King. The products were sold in numerous countries including Japan.

Pizza Hut's and KFC's parent Yum! Brands, Inc. apologized to Chinese customers after the scandal was exposed. Shanghai Husi Food Co Ltd based in China was a subsidiary of U.S.-based OSI Group LLC.

The company was forced in July 2014 to shut down after local television station Dragon TV ran footage of the company's factory workers picking meat such as hamburger patties from off the factory floor and throwing them directly into meat mixers, and handling poultry and beef on the assembly line with their bare hands. The footage also showed sewage and trash spread all over the floor of the plant. In addition, the expired meat, which workers described as "stinky", was concealed mostly by mixing it with non-expired meat.

=== Sodium formaldehyde sulfoxylate (CH_{3}NaO_{3}S) ===
A video about the top 10 most common toxic substances in Chinese food and snacks looked into the use of the carcinogen, sodium formaldehyde sulfoxylate (CH_{3}NaO_{3}S), to bleach food. According to the video, this practice has been widely adopted by the largely unregulated Chinese food industry. In the video, all 12 samples taken from mianjing snack stalls in Beijing were found to contain CH_{3}NaO_{3}S. Mushrooms, tofu, mianjing (a Chinese starch product), mixian (mainly rice made noodles), vermicelli, and flour were among the food that contained contaminated substances. Bean and starch products were also found contaminated with CH_{3}NaO_{3}S.

=== Fake hot pot soup ===
A video made by a Chinese dietitian has become popular on Internet showing a commonly adopted way to turn boiled water into "high quality pork soup" for hot pot. By adding ethyl maltol, capsicum oleoresin, and disodium 5'-ribonucleotide into boiled water, fake pork hot pot soup becomes ready to serve in 20 seconds. As investigators dug deeper, it was revealed to the public that many cooks of hot pot restaurants took training programs in China that approved the fraud to reduce cost. Investigators also found antimalarial drugs in the soup to cover the side effects of rotten meat.

In the same video, the dietitian also showed a common method to make "beef balls" from bean powder by adding sodium pyrophosphate (Na_{4}P_{2}O_{7}·10H_{2}O) and sodium tripolyphosphate (Na_{5}P_{3}O_{10}).

== Food safety incidents in 2015 ==
=== 20 million RMB salt raid ===
In a massive crackdown, Chinese police seized 20 million RMB. 22 people were arrested after they sold industrial salt as "Beijing salt with iodine". After testing the salt, it was found that there was no iodine in it. There was however, nitrite in the salt packets. Police conducted raids in cities and provinces such as Beijing, Tianjin, Hubei, Hunan, Shandong, Jiangsu, and Anhui. Investigations later revealed that the industrial salt had originated in Beijing and was transported to other provinces by long-distance truck drivers. Criminals bought large quantities of industrial salt, which they broken them down into very small portions, selling little baggies for 2 yuan. Since industrial salt is not iodized, consuming it leads to an iodine deficiency as well as nervous system damage. The police believed that over 22,000 tonnes of salt was sold by this group.

=== Contaminated infant formula recalled ===
During a routine inspection, Chinese authorities discovered that seven batches of goat milk failed safety standards. The authorities discovered nitrate and selenium in the milk. The three companies that failed the inspection were Shaanxi Feihe Guanshan Dairy Company Limited, Xi'an Feihe Guanshan Dairy Company Limited, and Shaanxi Shengtang Qunlong Dairy Company Limited. One sample contained 10 times more nitrate than the national safety standard set by the China's Food and Drug Administration. In response to the failed test, the Chinese Food and Drug Administration ordered the three companies to cease production and to recall any milk that has been sold.

== Food safety incidents in 2016 ==
=== 500,000 food safety violations report by China's Food and Drug Administration ===
There were 500,000 cases of food safety violations in China in the first three quarters of 2016. In a report presented by Bi Jingquan, there were over 15 million food safety inspections conducted by China's Food and Drug Administration. Public health violations include false advertising of food, the selling of contaminated food and drinks, and the use of counterfeit material in the production of food and drink. Notable incidents of food safety violations included the use of industrial gelatine and salt. While Bi Jingquan argued that China was making progress in food safety, he argued that food safety problems remained to be "deep-rooted".

== Food safety incidents in 2017 ==
=== Fake alcohol ===
In November 2017, 13 people got poisoned by drinking methanol labeled as alcohol. The Muse Bar in Shenzhen has been closed and four people have been detained for selling the toxic fake alcohol. This is a common example of the widespread practice of labelling cheap or toxic drinks as brand-name alcohol in China.

=== Oil made from rotting pig carcasses ===
In July 2017, some journalists uncovered an oil refinery that was making oil from rotting pig carcasses. The stench that the factory released was so bad that the nearby villagers could not even open their windows at night.

== Food safety incidents in 2019 ==
=== Rotten food in high school ===
Parents of students at China's most prestigious schools in Chengdu discovered rotten food in the canteen. A group of parents invited to a tree-planting ceremony went to the canteen and found moldy bread, rotten meat, and seafood. Outraged at what they saw, the parents posted to social media. The Chengdu police threatened to arrest the parents for speaking out because they were "creating a disturbance". In the aftermath of the incident, the school apologized to the parents and said that they would choose a different supplier. Thirty-six children went to the hospital for a check-up but they were all let go.

== Food safety incidents in 2020 ==
=== Fermented suantangzi corn noodles ===
In Jixi city, located in Heilongjiang, nine people died after eating suantangzi fermented corn noodles. On October 5, twelve members of a family were having corn noodles, a common dish in the province. Three of the twelve refrained from eating the dish due to its strange taste. Within hours of consuming the dish, members who did eat the dish started falling ill and later died. Later reports said that they have died from Bongkrek acid. Experts say that when poisoned with Bongkrek acid, victims have a mortality rate of 40–100%. Symptoms include sweating, stomach pain, coma, and even death. In later investigations, it was found that the fermented noodles were in the freezer for over a year. In response to these deaths, China's National Health Commission has warned its citizens not to make food with fermented flour and rice.

=== Star anise ===
In September 2020, in the main star anise production area of Nanning, Guangxi, it was a "public secret" to use sulfur fumigation to preserve star anise. Tests showed that the sulfur dioxide residue in the star anise on the market exceeded the national standard by 16 times.

== Food safety incidents in 2022 ==
=== Adulterated pork sold as cured beef ===
In March 2022, a couple in Huai'an, Jiangsu used pork as raw material, soaked it in sodium nitrite, colored it with erythrosine, processed it into semi-finished cured meat, and sold it as beef, earning more than 800,000 yuan. The nitrite content in the pork they sold exceeded the national standard by 7 times.

=== Pickled cabbage ===
Also in March 2022, during the CCTV Spring Evening Gala, Hunan Chaqi Vegetable Industry was exposed for supplying substandard pickled cabbage to Kangshifu, a popular instant noodle brand, and other major food industry brands. Instead of being fermented via the traditional process in glass jars in a modern facility as advertised, the pickled cabbage underwent a quick seven-day fermentation process in earth pits on the ground near the cabbage farms. Workers were also reported to be stepping on the vegetables barefoot and throwing cigarette butts into the pits. The bacteria count of the pickled cabbage exceeded the standard, as did preservatives, which did not prevent the pickles from spoiling and turning black in as little as two months. Kangshifu voluntarily withdrew the involved instant noodles from the market, and KFC and other companies mentioned on the supplier's website denied any association.

== Food safety incidents in 2023 ==
=== Rat head in school meal ===
A mostly intact and clearly recognisable rat's head was found in a school meal in Nanchang. Chinese authorities overturned previous official reassurances that it was duck neck, as video evidence of the scandal quickly propagated on social media.

== Food safety incidents in 2024 ==
=== Cooking oil transported in chemical tanks ===
Two Chinese companies have used fuel trucks to transport edible oil without any cleaning process between loads.

== Food safety incidents in 2025 ==
=== Kindergarten lead poisoning ===
In July 2025 over 200 children were treated in hospital with suspected lead poisoning after school cooks used inedible paint to decorate food at Peixin Kindergarten in Tianshui city. An official investigation found that laboratory staff and provincial officials attempted to cover up the poisonings by tampering with laboratory results and accepting bribes whilst neglecting food safety inspections.

== Food safety incidents in 2026 ==
=== Cabbages treated with formaldehyde ===
In August 2026, a blogger published video showing vegetable wholesalers in Kangbao county, Hebei treating cabbages with a formaldehyde solution to preserve freshness prior to transportation. Formaldehyde is a carcinogen, and its use in this manner is illegal in China. Local officials verified that the footage was genuine, and took legal action against the culprits. National authorities also responded, launching a wider investigation into such practices and increasing inspections on the supply chain for agricultural produce across the country.
