= Gutter oil =

Waste oil used illegally for food preparation

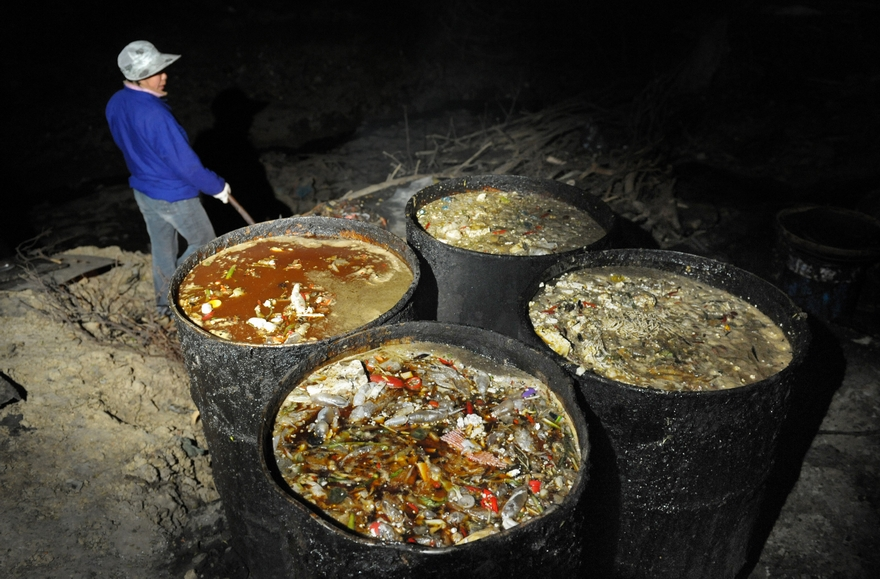
Collected food waste, sometimes used for the production of gutter oil

Gutter oil, trench oil, sewer oil, hogwash oil and tainted oil (Chinese: 地沟油 / 地溝油; pinyin: dìgōu yóu, or 餿水油; sōushuǐ yóu) are Chinese slang terms primarily used in China and Taiwan to refer to recycled oil.

It can be used to describe the illicit practice of restaurants reusing cooking oil that has already been cooked for longer than safety codes permit. It can also be used to describe the reprocessing of yellow grease collected from sources such as restaurant fryers, kitchen waste, slaughterhouse waste and sewer drains.

Since 2011, the Chinese government has significantly cracked down on the reuse of gutter oil for human consumption, with the Chinese government also implementing clearer regulations for dealing with waste oil. Selling gutter oil in China can result in lengthy prison sentences or the death sentence with reprieve. For example, in 2014, businessman Zhu Chuanfeng was sentenced to the latter for selling gutter oil. That same year, a major gutter oil scandal was uncovered in Taiwan. In 2015, Yeh Wen-hsiang, who was the chairman of a Taiwanese food company, was sentenced to 22 years imprisonment and fined NT$50 million (US$1.6 million) for selling 243 tonnes of gutter oil.

== History ==
The first documented case of gutter oil in Taiwan was reported in 1985. In a subsequent investigation, 22 people were arrested for involvement in a recycling oil ring over 10 years based in Taipei. The worst offender was sentenced to 7 years in prison.

The first documented case of gutter oil in mainland China was reported in 2000, when a street vendor was found to be selling oil obtained from restaurant garbage disposals.

Some street vendors and restaurants in China are reported to have illegally used recycled oil unfit for human consumption to cook food.

In 2010, it was estimated that gutter oil represented 10% of China's edible oil market (with 1 in every 10 restaurants using it) and that 3 million tonnes of gutter oil were consumed in China annually, with a network of distributors of gutter oil across central and eastern China. In 2011, the Chinese government began a major crackdown on the re-use of gutter oil for human consumption. In 2011, they arrested 32 people for producing the oil and seized 90 tonnes of it in 14 provinces. This amount is equivalent to around one-tenth of the oil typically used by restaurants. Feng Ping of the China Meat Research Center has said that "[t]he illegal oil shows no difference in appearance and indicators after refining and purification, because the law breakers are skillful at coping with the established standards."

In September 2012, an ongoing investigation into the suspected use of gutter oil as a raw material in the Chinese pharmaceutical industry was revealed. A scandal involving 240 tons of gutter oil in Taiwan affecting hundreds of companies and thousands of restaurants, some of which may have been exported overseas, broke in September 2014.

In 2018, researchers worked on identifying different components in gutter oil using 1H NMR (proton nuclear magnetic resonance), MALDI-MS (matrix-assisted laser desorption/ionization-mass spectrometry) and HPLC (high-performance liquid chromatography).

== Regulations and law enforcement ==
Chinese law states that industrial-grade animal fat is not allowed for use in food products because it does not meet basic hygiene standards and may contain high levels of potentially toxic contaminants. The national and local governments are researching ways to test and identify gutter oil but as of 2012 there were no nationwide standards in place to help with this process. The government is looking into methods that rely on technical equipment as well as on-site instant tests to screen suspect oil. There are five proposed tests for gutter oil but each has failed to accurately detect it.

Due to China's vast industry of factories involved with legal waste oil processing to create products like plastics, rubbers, fuels, soaps, etc., there have been abundant rumors and allegations about unscrupulous middlemen selling gutter oil for cooking and frying. However, it remains difficult to prove and prosecute such profiteers. Food safety articles funded by PRC provincial science grants attribute continued difficulties in regulatory enforcement to the decentralized nature of the logistics chain, inadequate national infrastructure for disposal/recycling, and frequent innovations in visually and chemically disguising gutter oil.

In August and September 2011, the Beijing city government passed two new sets of regulations. The first was "On Accelerating the City's Food Waste and Waste Oil Recycling Program". Its goals are to increase daily food waste processing to 2,200 tons by 2012 and to 2,900 tons by 2015. Additionally, the intent of the regulations is to create a system that "should be a unified, standardized, and orderly processing of waste oil collection and improvement of the transportation system". The second set of regulations by the city of Beijing, called the "Beijing Municipal Solid Waste Regulations", was passed in September 2011. The regulations specifically target the two sources of gutter oil: food waste and used oil. The central government intends for these two sets of regulations to serve as national examples, yet wants every municipality nationally to find their own solutions to the food waste and gutter oil problem.

A nationwide campaign was set in motion in August 2011 to crack down on the widespread production and selling of gutter oil. The law enforcement campaign uncovered 100 gutter oil manufacturers and arrested more than 800 people allegedly involved in the production and sale of gutter oil. In April 2012, another crackdown occurred with an additional 100 arrests made and 13 illegal workshops closed down across four provinces. According to a notice released jointly by the Supreme People's Court, the Supreme People's Procuratorate and the Ministry of Public Security, the death penalty will now be an option when prosecuting more serious cases of gutter oil manufacturing in the country. More severe punishments will also be given out to government and public officials who fail to properly address matters related to gutter oil. The State Council said inspectors would target edible oil trade fairs and wholesale markets and called for inspections of oil being used at restaurants, school cafeterias, work canteens and kitchens at construction sites. The State Council also stated that businesses that use recycled oil would be forced to close temporarily or lose their business license while peddlers who sell the oil could be criminally prosecuted. In October 2013, a man from eastern China's Jiangsu Province was sentenced to life imprisonment for profiting heavily from making and selling gutter oil.

In January 2014, Zhu Chuanfeng was sentenced to death with a two-year reprieve, and his brothers Zhu Chuanqing and Zhu Chuanbo were sentenced to life in prison for selling gutter oil.

== Production and distribution ==
Entire illicit supply chains dedicated to collecting, processing, and reselling gutter oil have been discovered by regulators in China. Multiple low-end restaurants in China have been found to cook with gutter oil. Additionally, in 2012, the Chinese government accused a Chinese pharmaceutical company of using gutter oil as a precursor for the manufacturing of cephalosporin antibiotics. About two to three million tons of cooking oil containing cancerous substances are produced in China each year. In 2010 it was estimated that approximately one tenth of the meals consumed by people in China could contain gutter oil.

Collected waste oil is sold to local workshops or small factories for cleaning and packaging. When sold to workshops it is often transported by bicycle mounted collectors; afterwards, the oil is held in 200-liter barrels at the workshops until it is processed. On other occasions the oil goes to industrial cooking oil refineries for further processing before it finally reaches its end purpose.

Reprocessing of used cooking oil is often very rudimentary; techniques include filtration, boiling, refining, and the removal of some adulterants. It is then packaged and resold as a cheaper alternative to normal cooking oil.

Another version of gutter oil uses discarded animal parts, animal fat and skins, internal organs, and expired or otherwise low-quality meat, which is then cooked in large vats to extract the oil.

Some lower-market restaurants have long-term purchase agreements with oil recyclers for selling their used oil. Low-end restaurants and street vendors are the biggest end users of gutter oil, as they operate with lower profit margins than bigger restaurants. Oil is a large kitchen supply cost for some restaurants, so obtaining cheaper oil can allow a marginal restaurant to reduce its overall expenses. Chinese food is generally heavily dependent on oil due to most foods being fried, so cheaper meal prices for many price-sensitive consumers are possible if gutter oil is used instead of virgin oil. The situation becomes more serious because it is hard to distinguish reprocessed gutter oil from legitimate oil. Bleach is used to transform gutter oil's dark color into a more natural-looking one, and alkali additives are used to neutralize the abnormal pH caused by high concentrations of animal fats.

Used kitchen oil can be purchased for between US$859 and US$937 per ton, while the cleaned and refined product can sell for US$1,560 per ton. Thus there is great economic incentive to produce and sell gutter oil.

== Health effects ==
Gutter oil has been shown to be toxic, causing diarrhea and abdominal pain. Long-term consumption of gutter oil may cause many foodborne illnesses because the oil may contain excessive amounts of cholesterol, trans fats, toxic heavy metals and pathogens such as bacteria, and also carcinogenic substances such as polycyclic aromatic hydrocarbons and aflatoxins, and therefore lead to stomach and liver cancer. Zeng Jing of the Guangdong Armed Police Hospital said of gutter oil, "Animal and vegetable fat in refined waste oil will undergo rancidity, oxidation and decomposition after contamination. It will cause indigestion, insomnia, liver discomfort and other symptoms."

Due to rumours and the fear of Chinese customers of restaurants using gutter oil in their cooking, it has been reported that some people in China have resorted to bringing their own cooking oil with them from home into restaurants and instructing chefs to use their home-brought oil in their kitchen when preparing their food instead of the restaurant's own cooking oil.

== Legal disposal and reuse of waste oil ==
Legitimate producers of gutter oil sell the processed oil for use in the chemical or energy industries. However, such refiners can also have illegal side business, as the prices attained by selling it as cooking oil are much higher than if it is sold to the chemical or energy industries such as KBR Energy.

Yellow and brown grease typical of gutter oil are acceptable raw feedstocks for products not intended for human consumption, such as plastics, rubber, rooftops, soap, cosmetics, and bio-fuel.

In the city of Shanghai, it was reported that over 2,000 buses ran on biodiesel that was made from gutter oil, and many gas stations in Shanghai offered gasoline that was produced in part from gutter oil. Sustainable utilization of gutter oil for biofuel production is being explored using different chemical and enzymatic methods.

=== Gutter oil in other countries ===
Gutter oil has also been used outside of China as well, albeit not for human consumption. For example, in England, fatbergs that were dug out of sewers in cities like London and Liverpool were later reported to be processed to produce biofuel.

== See also ==
- Food safety incidents in China
- Food safety incidents in Taiwan
