= Chinese cardboard bun hoax =

Falsified Chinese food scandal

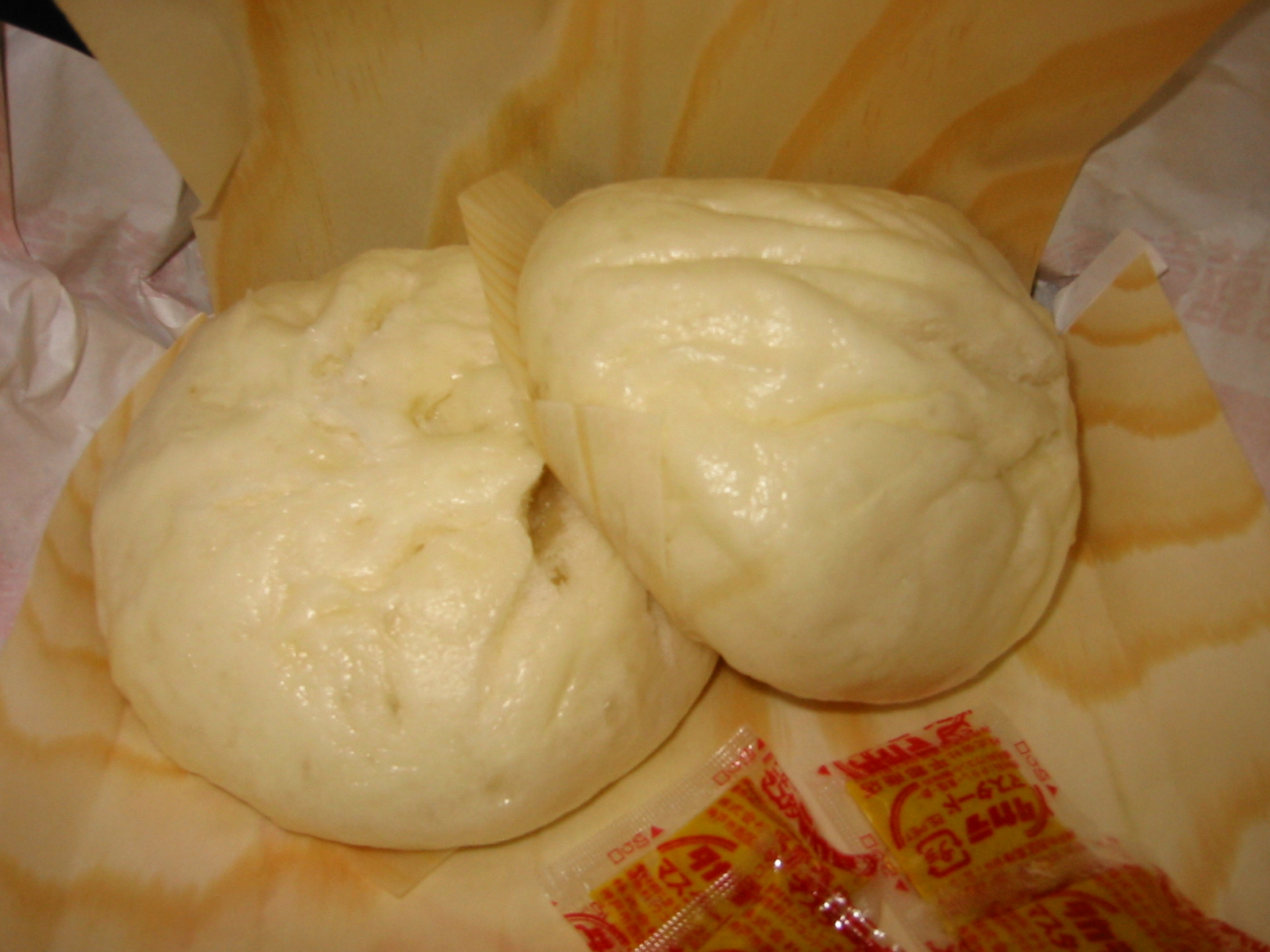
Pork buns (not filled with cardboard)

The cardboard bun hoax was a falsified news report broadcast in July 2007 on Beijing Television's BTV-7 (the Lifestyle Channel). In the report, footage implied that local vendors were selling pork buns, a common breakfast food, filled with a composite of 60% caustic soda-soaked cardboard and 40% fatty pork. Coming after several highly publicized food safety incidents in China, the report was widely believed and sparked public outrage.

On July 18, 2007, Chinese law enforcement officials reported that they had detained Zi Beijia (訾北佳), a local freelance reporter, for allegedly faking the news report. Zi, using the alias Hu Yue (胡月), is believed to have hired four migrant workers to make the cardboard buns as he filmed. BTV 7 apologized, saying it was "profoundly sorry" for the deception and its "vile impact on society." Beijing's health authorities reported finding no evidence of cardboard in local buns. Furthermore, the Beijing Municipal Food Safety Office found that if buns had as little as a 5% mixture of cardboard, "the fiber substance can be easily seen, and the meat buns made this way could not be easily chewed."

On August 12, 2007, Zi was sentenced to a year in jail and a fine of $132.

== See also ==
- Food safety incidents in China
