= WRc =

British water research company

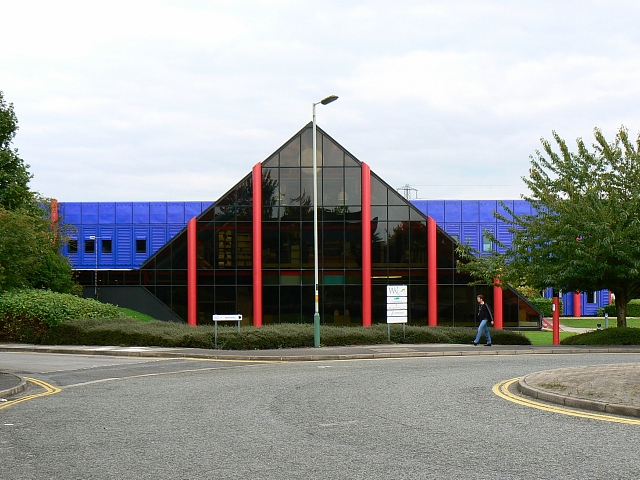
Headquarters building, Swindon

The WRc Group is a company providing research and consultancy in water, waste and the environment in the United Kingdom. A government body, the Water Pollution Research Board, was set up in 1927 and was merged in 1974 with the Water Research Association and the Water Resources Board to form the Water Research Centre, which was controlled by, and undertook research for, the regional water authorities; the organisation was privatised in 1989 as WRc plc, then acquired by RSK Group in 2020.

== History ==
The Water Pollution Research Board (WPRB) was established in 1927 by the Department of Scientific and Industrial Research (DSIR).

The management board comprised up to eight members drawn from industry, commerce, academia and learned societies. In addition there were up to 12 ‘assessors’ from government departments such as the Ministry of Agriculture, fisheries and food; the Development Commission; Ministry of Housing and Local Government; Ministry of Public Building and Works; the Board of Trade; the Ministry of Transport.

The Board had no laboratories and fulfilled its remit of providing research and advice on sewage treatment by outsourcing and conducting surveys. Laboratory facilities finally became available in 1940 when DSIR set up the Water Pollution Research Laboratory (WPRL) in Watford. During the Second World War WPRL also worked in other areas, notably the creation of a device for airmen to make sea water acceptable as drinking water.

An example of the WPRB's work was a major study of the tidal Thames. In 1948 the WPRB appointed the Thames Survey Committee to study the condition of the Thames Estuary. Of particular interest was the capacity of the river to purify the sewage and industrial effluents discharged into it. The committee first met in January 1949 and finally reported in a 607 page paper Effects of Polluting Discharges on the Thames Estuary in 1964.

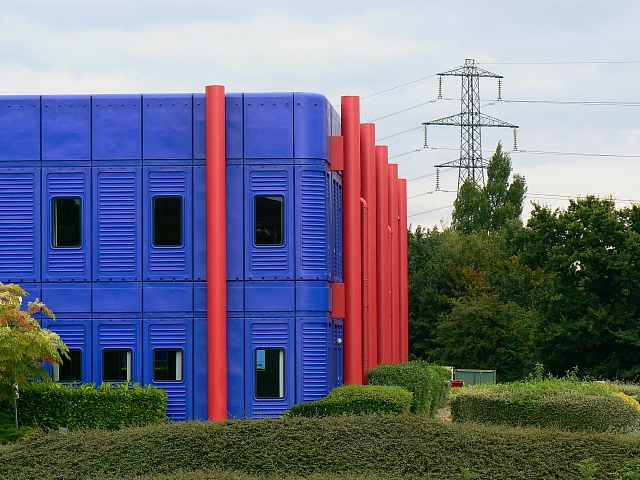
Headquarters building, side view

In 1955 the WPRL moved to a purpose-built laboratory in Elder Way, Stevenage, and here it is associated with the first systematic analyses of sewage treatment. Following the 1974 reorganisation of the UK water supply industry both WPRL and the Water Resources Board (WRB) were transferred from the Civil Service and merged with the Water Research Association (WRA) to form a quango, controlled by the publicly-owned regional water authorities. The WRA had been founded in 1953 and provided research and advice on drinking water treatment to the municipal bodies responsible for drinking water supply; it was based at Medmenham, Buckinghamshire. The new organisation was renamed the Water Research Centre (WRC).

In 1989 the Water Research Centre was privatised and renamed WRc plc, as part of the privatisation of the UK water industry. As part of the process a small offshoot, the Foundation for Water Research (FWR), was created and the Stevenage site was shut down. In 2004 the Medmenham site was also closed, leaving Swindon as WRc's main site. The WRc Group employs around 150 staff. Until 2020, its shares were mainly owned by its staff and UK water companies; it was then acquired by the RSK Group.

== Achievements ==
Notable WRc achievements include:

=== 1960s ===
- First analysis that activated sludge nitrification could be mathematically modelled

=== 1970s ===
- Development of first accurate general activated sludge model
- Development of the standard approach to minimising the effects of bulking sludge on activated sludge
- Only public body of extensive research of trickling filters
- Development of the SSVI technique for analysing activated sludge settleability
- Development of the first mass-flux based analysis of activated sludge settler design
- Development of two standard assessment techniques for sludge thickening and dewatering, the CST (capillary suction time) and PFT (pressure filtration test)

=== 1980s ===
- Water-industry standard techniques for assessing sludge rheology, and a general correlation for rheological properties used in the absence of experimental data
- Development of techniques for water mains and sewer rehabilitation, without requiring extensive digging and replacing of pipes
- Co-development with the UK water industry of the Urban Pollution Management procedure, the first formal procedure for analysing water pollution at the catchment level, and which was one of the drivers for the subsequent EU legislation behind the Water Framework Directive
- Comprehensive capital cost models (TR 61) used widely by the water companies, and recognised by Ofwat as a comparator for company-specific costs

=== 1990s–present ===
Today WRc works with a range of customers in the public and private sectors around the world. Its clients include:

- UK government and regulators such as: the Environment Agency, Department for Environment, Food & Rural Affairs (Defra), Communities and Local Government, Department for Transport (DfT), Highways Agency and the Office of Water Services (Ofwat).
- All of the UK water utilities, many international utilities and companies throughout the water and environmental supply chains.
- Waste management and recycling companies and organisations in their supply chains.
- European Commission Directorates General including: Environment, Research, Competition, Agriculture and Regional Policies.
- International funders such as the World Bank and the Department for International Development (DfID).
- Trade associations and not-for-profit organisations e.g. Waste and Resources Action Programme (WRAP), Water UK, Environmental Services Association (ESA) and UK Water Industry Research (UKWIR).
- Local governments and authorities.
- Blue chip companies involved in agriculture, retail and manufacturing (especially in the food and drink, chemical and pharmaceutical sectors).

== Key people ==
- Dr R. G, Allen (Director WRC 1974–1978)
- Jan Laurens van der Post (Chief Executive WRC 1978–84)
- Michael J. Rouse (Chief Executive WRC 1984–)
- Ralph Hodge (Chairman 1995–2005)
- John Moss (Chief Executive 1993-2005)
- John Merrill (Chairman 2005–)
- Ron Chapman (Chief Executive 2005–)
- Mark Smith (CEO–2021)
- Andy Blackhall (MD 2021–2025)

== Former constituent organisations ==
=== Water Research Association ===
The Water Research Association was established in 1953. It was the central research organisation for the British water supply industry, and one of the official Research Associations administered by the Ministry of Technology. Its remit was to promote, assist and support research into domestic, commercial, industrial and agricultural use of water obtained from all sources. Furthermore, it was to promote research into the water works trade and other industries by establishing laboratories and workshops and conduct experiments and to fund such work to improve the education of persons engaged in the industry. Its research station, opened in 1961, was by the River Thames at Medmenham, Marlow, Buckinghamshire. It became part of the Water Research Centre in 1974. The WRA's Director (1955-1974) was Dr R. G. Allen.

=== Water Resources Board ===
The Water Resources Board was established on 1 July 1964 under the provisions of the Water Resources Act 1963. Its duty was to advise river authorities and central government on the development of water resources in England and Wales. The WRB had a staff of 160, principally engineers. A supervisory board met monthly. The WRB devised schemes such as one for a water grid in north east England which might also supply Sheffield and Chesterfield 200 miles to the south. The WRB did not have a remit on water quality and this was a fatal handicap. The Board was disbanded under the terms of the Water Act 1973. This dissolved the 29 River Authorities and created ten Water Authorities with much broader terms of reference.
