= Yellow grease =

Recycled cooking oil

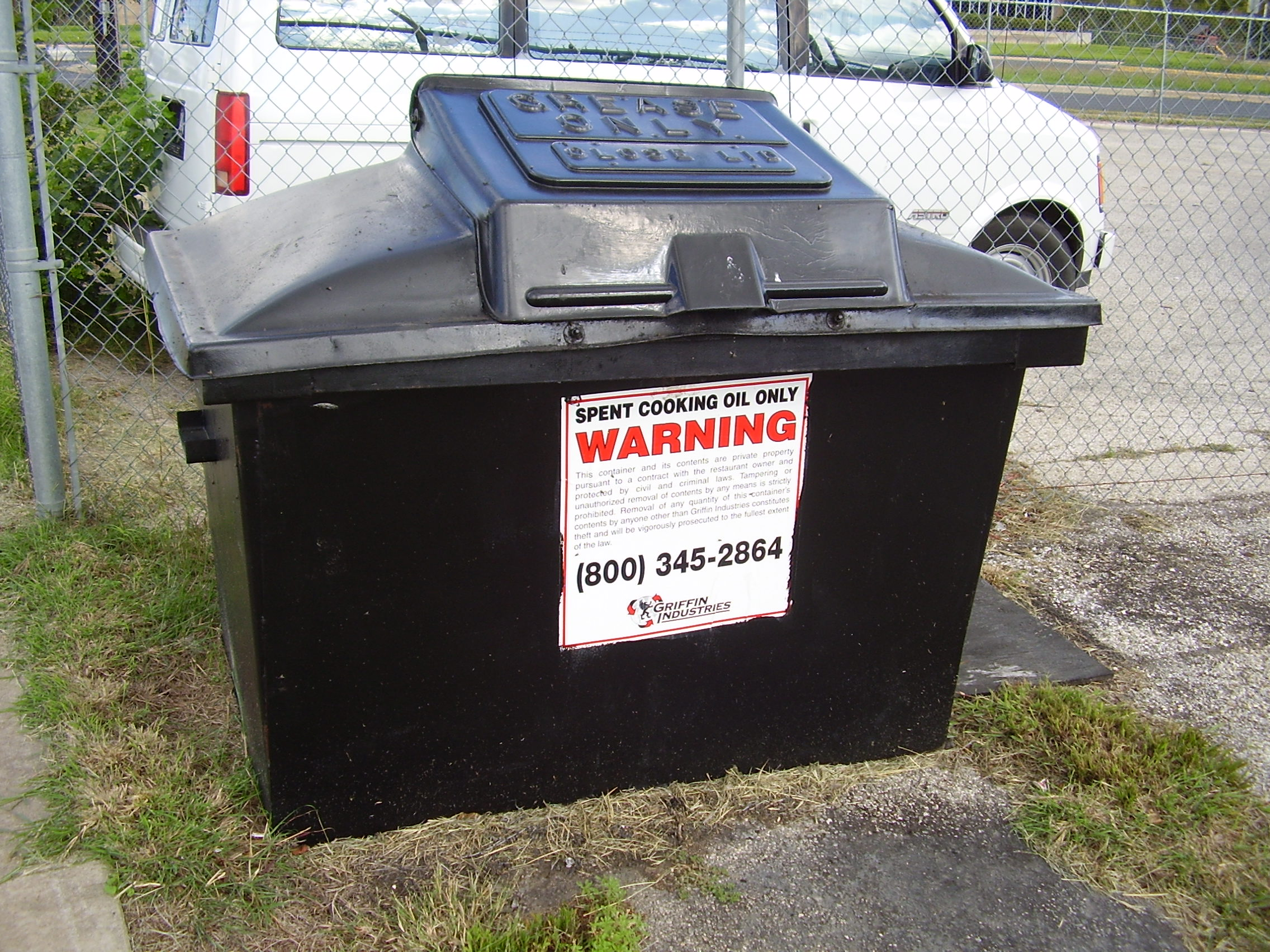
A bin for spent cooking oil in Austin, Texas, United States, managed by a recycling company.

Yellow grease, also termed used cooking oil (UCO), used vegetable oil (UVO), recycled vegetable oil, or waste vegetable oil (WVO), is recovered from businesses and industry that use the oil for cooking.

It is used to feed livestock, and to manufacture soap, make-up, clothes, rubber, and detergents. Due to competition from these other industrial sectors, the EIA estimates that less than a third of yellow grease could be spared for biodiesel production annually.

It is distinct from brown grease; yellow grease is typically used frying oils from deep fryers, whereas brown grease is sourced from grease interceptors.

== Market and use ==
The global used cooking oil market was 5.16 billion USD in 2020 and expected to grow at 7.76% CAGR to reach 10.08 billion USD in 2028.

The market for biodiesel/renewable diesel has reached 2.8 billion gallons with more than 3 billion gallons online today. Expectations are for 6 billion gallons by 2030.

== Oil collectors ==
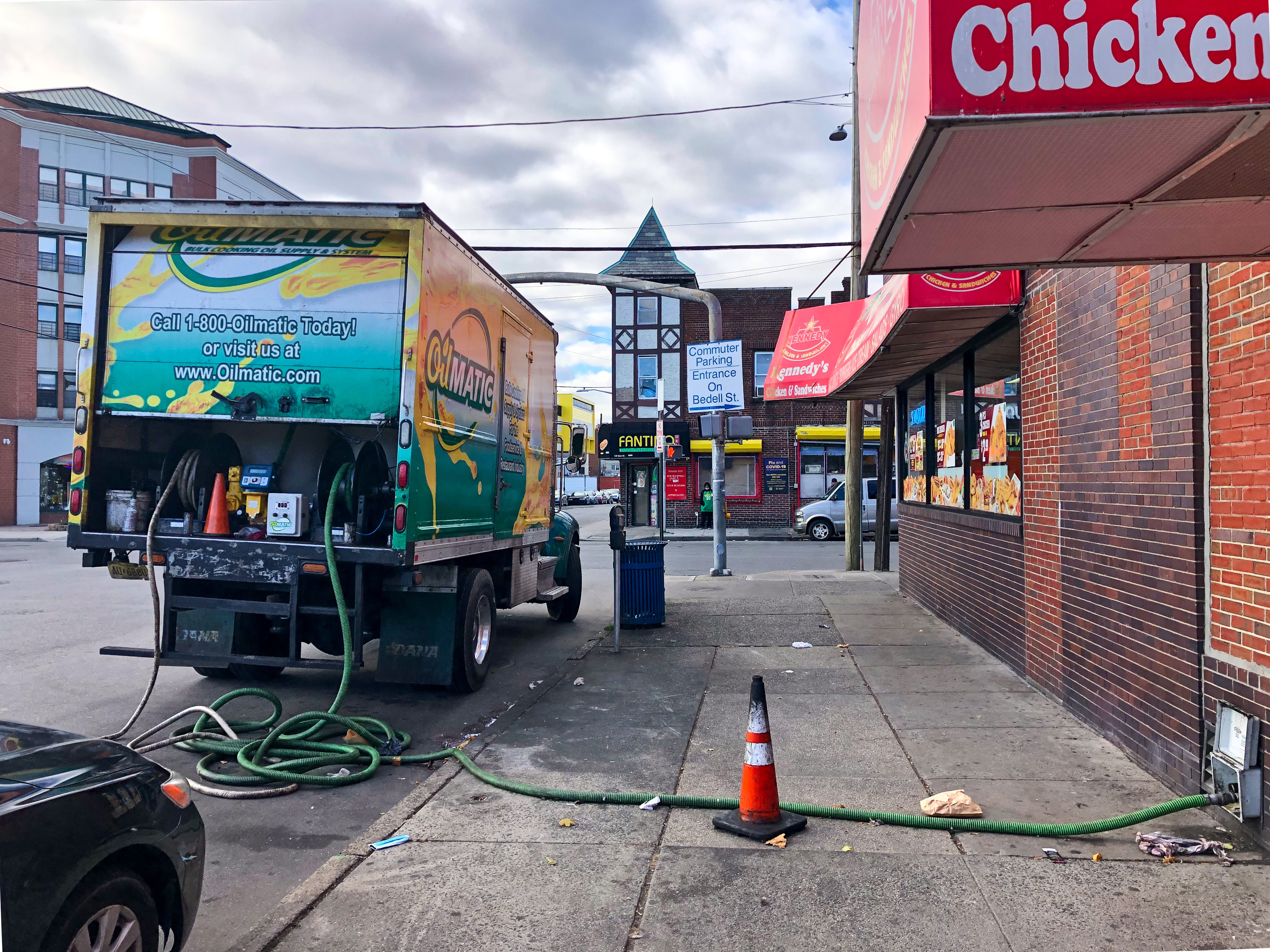
Cooking oil collection truck in operation, Hempstead, New York

The industry which collects and renders yellow grease to make refined used cooking oil is dominated by a number of very large companies.

No reliable statistics exist on the number of smaller to mid-size companies who collect yellow grease and either sell or render it to produce refined used cooking oil. Estimates run to a couple of hundred. Even so, theft is common and many "companies" may remain unregistered.

The collection of used cooking oil has grown to the point where fleets of trucks, regional and nationwide coverage and large processing plants are commonplace and consulting groups and software companies play an increasingly prominent role. Automated collection and storage systems for used cooking oil are rising dramatically.

In the UK, waste cooking oil collection is governed by the Environment Agency. All collections need to be carried out by a company registered as a waste carrier by the Environment Agency. On each collection a waste transfer note needs to be filled out and copies held by both parties for a minimum of 3 years. Waste transfer notes can be hard paper copies or electronic versions.

== Oil renderers ==
The recycling of waste cooking oil (aka restaurant grease, used cooking oil or yellow grease) is a process known as "rendering". During the rendering process fatty acid is separated from the moisture, the solids and any impurities that are present in the waste cooking oil. The rendering of waste cooking oil produces one usable element and several waste elements.

Some collectors do their own rendering while others may sell their grease for a lower price to a company with the space and equipment to do so.

Refined used cooking oil is what is left after separation of solids and moisture from yellow grease. Refined used cooking oil is the base for producing biodiesel and renewable diesel.

Refined used cooking oil then goes through either to transesterification to produce biodiesel or hydrodeoxygenation to produce renewable diesel.

== See also ==
- Bioliquids
- Biodiesel
- Vegetable oil fuel
- Cooking oil
- Vegetable oils as alternative energy
- Gutter oil (counterfeit cooking oil)
- Fatberg
