= Zhu Chuanfeng =

Chinese person sentenced to death for selling gutter oil

- 朱传峰
- Occupation: Businessman
- Years active: 2001-2014
- Employer(s): Developed Oil Co., Ltd.
- Known for: Selling gutter oil
- Relatives: Zhu Chuanqing (brother); Zhu Chuanbo (brother)
- Motive: Profit
- Conviction: January 2014
- Criminal charges: Producing and selling toxic and harmful food falsely issuing special invoices for value-added tax
- Penalty: Death sentence with a two-year reprieve; confiscation of all private property
- Accomplices: Zhu Chuanqing; Zhu Chuanbo; Du Hengqiang; Du Hengcai; Zhu Hongtao; Jiang Weidong; Zhu Chuanguo; Liu Xingshan; Liu Hengliang

Details
- Victims: C
- Date: January 2014 (sentencing)
- Span of crimes: 2006 (began selling gutter oil) – 2014 (sentencing)
- Country: China
- State: Shandong
- Target: Public consumers
- Killed: Unknown (consumption of gutter oil is poisonous)
- Injured: Unknown (consumption of gutter oil is poisonous)
- Date apprehended: Yes
- Imprisoned at: Yes

Zhu Chuanfeng (Chinese: 朱传峰) was sentenced to death with a two-year reprieve in China for selling gutter oil, an illegal and poisonous food and cooking oil. Moreover, Zhu's brothers Zhu Chuanqing (朱传清) and Zhu Chuanbo (朱传波) were sentenced to life in prison. Seven others involved in the case (Du Hengqiang, Du Hengcai, Zhu Hongtao, Jiang Weidong, Zhu Chuanguo, Liu Xingshan, and Liu Hengliang) were given prison terms and fined as well.

== Background ==
In 2001, the three brothers Zhu Chuanfeng, Zhu Chuanqing, and Zhu Chuanbo invested in an oil plant under the pretense of selling animal oil.

In 2006, they began producing swill oil (泔水油) and gutter oil and marketed them as cooking oil, selling it for people to eat. Gutter oil is illegal and made by recycling kitchen oil and reprocessing waste oil, sometimes even using restaurant leftovers. It is dirty oil that contains carcinogens and is poisonous when consumed.

The Zhu brothers illegally sold the poisonous oil for people to consume to 17 dealers in Shanxi and Shandong and made 52.4 million yuan ($8.6 million) in revenue.

=== Company ===
In 2009, the Zhu brothers established the Developed Oil Co., Ltd. (发达油脂工业有限公司).

Zhu Chuanfeng was in charge of the overall work of the company, Zhu Chuanqing was in charge of the salesmen, and was responsible for the procurement of raw materials and product sales, and Zhu Chuanbo was in charge of product sales and company finance.

Zhu Chuanqing's brother-in-law Du Hengqiang (杜恒强) joined the company in 2003 and was in charge of production management from 2007.

In 2006, Jiang Weidong (蒋卫东) joined the company as the director of the west workshop, mainly in charge of equipment maintenance. Du Hengcai (杜恒才), Zhu Chuanguo (朱传国), and Liu Xingshan (刘兴善) successively worked as salesmen in the company during the Spring Festivals in 2003, 2006, and 2009. They were responsible for the purchase of "swill oil" and the promotion of gutter oil.

In March 2008, Zhu Hongtao (朱洪涛) joined the company and was responsible for unloading "swill oil" and filling "waste oil".

In October 2010, Liu Hengliang (刘恒亮) joined the company and was responsible for weighing and collecting oil payments in the western workshop.

=== Business operation ===
A villager once described the Zhu brothers' waste oil industry chain as follows: a trailer with a length of 20 to 30 meters transporting waste oil raw materials from other places is full of diesel barrels, and there can be at most five or six cars a day. It comes down from the intersection of Xiaozhi Expressway (孝直高速路口) nearby, travels 10 kilometers northbound along National Highway 105, and goes straight to Zhujia Factory (朱家厂子) at the east end of Guoliugou Village (郭柳沟村). Tankers who come from other places to pull oil usually come at night or on Saturday and Sunday. Among the oil trucks, villagers saw cars in Nanjing, Jiangsu, Jining, Shandong and other places, while an edible oil factory in Tai'an (泰安) came in a few days. In the countryside, it was once said that the Zhu brothers could earn 200,000 to 300,000 yuan a day.

=== Value-added tax scandal ===
In the process of operation, a developed company must issue a special output value-added tax (VAT) invoice to the other party when selling oleic acid and stearic acid products produced because the purchased "swill oil" does not have a special input value-added tax invoice, so as to be able to deduct tax.

Zhu Chuanqing asked Ma Yuwang (马玉旺), a self-employed edible oil operator, to help issue a special input value-added tax invoice.

Ma Yuwang agreed, and in the absence of actual purchase and sale business between developed companies and 11 companies including Shandong Yuwang Industrial Co., Ltd., Shanghai Yihai Trading Co., Ltd., Qingdao Bohai Agricultural Development Co., Ltd., he signed a false contract with the other party in the name of the developed company, allowing the other party to issue special invoices for the value-added tax to the developed company, helping the developed company to obtain 53 special invoices for input value-added tax, with a total amount of 13,353,312.68 yuan and a total tax of 1,735,930.72 yuan.

=== Arrest ===
For selling illegal gutter oil and issuing a fake tax invoice, the following 10 people were arrested and eventually imprisoned:

- Zhu Chuanfeng,
- Zhu Chuanqing,
- Zhu Chuanbo,
- Du Hengqiang,
- Du Hengcai,
- Zhu Hongtao,
- Jiang Weidong,
- Zhu Chuanguo,
- Liu Xingshan,
- Liu Hengliang

== Sentence ==
In January 2014, the Jinan Intermediate People's Court in Shandong sentenced Zhu Chuanfeng to death and Zhu Chuanqing and Zhu Chuanbo to life imprisonment. All their assets were confiscated as well. Seven others involved in the case were sentenced to 5 to 15 years in prison and fined 500,000 and 2 million yuan each.

The court held through a trial that Zhu Chuanfeng, Zhu Chuanqing, Zhu Chuanbo, Du Hengqiang, Du Hengcai, Zhu Hongtao, Jiang Weidong, Zhu Chuanguo, Liu Xingshan, and Liu Hengliang mixed toxic and harmful non-food raw materials into the food produced and sold, and the amount was extremely large. In violation of the regulations on the administration of special VAT invoices, developed companies allowed others to falsely issue special VAT invoices for themselves to offset taxes, and the amount was huge.

According to the law, Zhu Chuanfeng was convicted of producing and selling toxic and harmful food, sentenced to death, suspended for two years, deprived of political rights for life, and had all his personal property confiscated.

Zhu Chuanqing and Zhu Chuanbo were convicted of producing and selling toxic and harmful food, sentenced to life imprisonment, deprived of political rights for life, and had all their personal property confiscated. They were also convicted of falsely issuing special invoices for value-added tax.

The remaining seven Du Hengqiang, Du Hengcai, Zhu Hongtao, Jiang Weidong, Zhu Chuanguo, Liu Xingshan, and Liu Hengliang were given up 5 to 15 years in prison and fined up to 2 million each.

The Zhu brothers' case came amid severe crackdowns on scandals following increased food safety laws in China since 2009. Selling gutter oil was a black market trade that was a chronic problem forming a multi-billion yuan business.

== See also ==
- Food safety incidents in China
- Gutter oil
