= Wet wipe =

Small moistened piece of paper or cloth

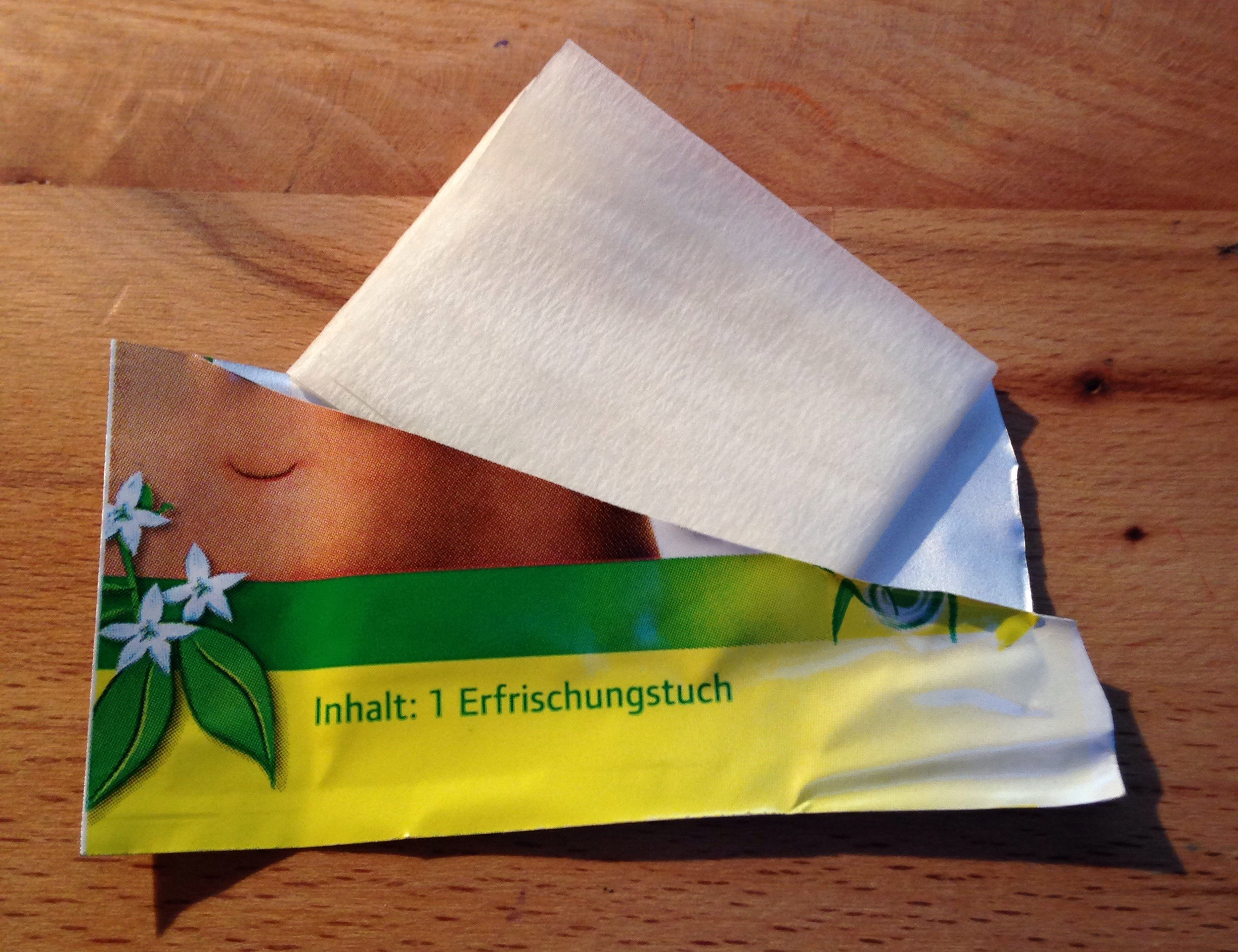
An individually-wrapped wet wipe

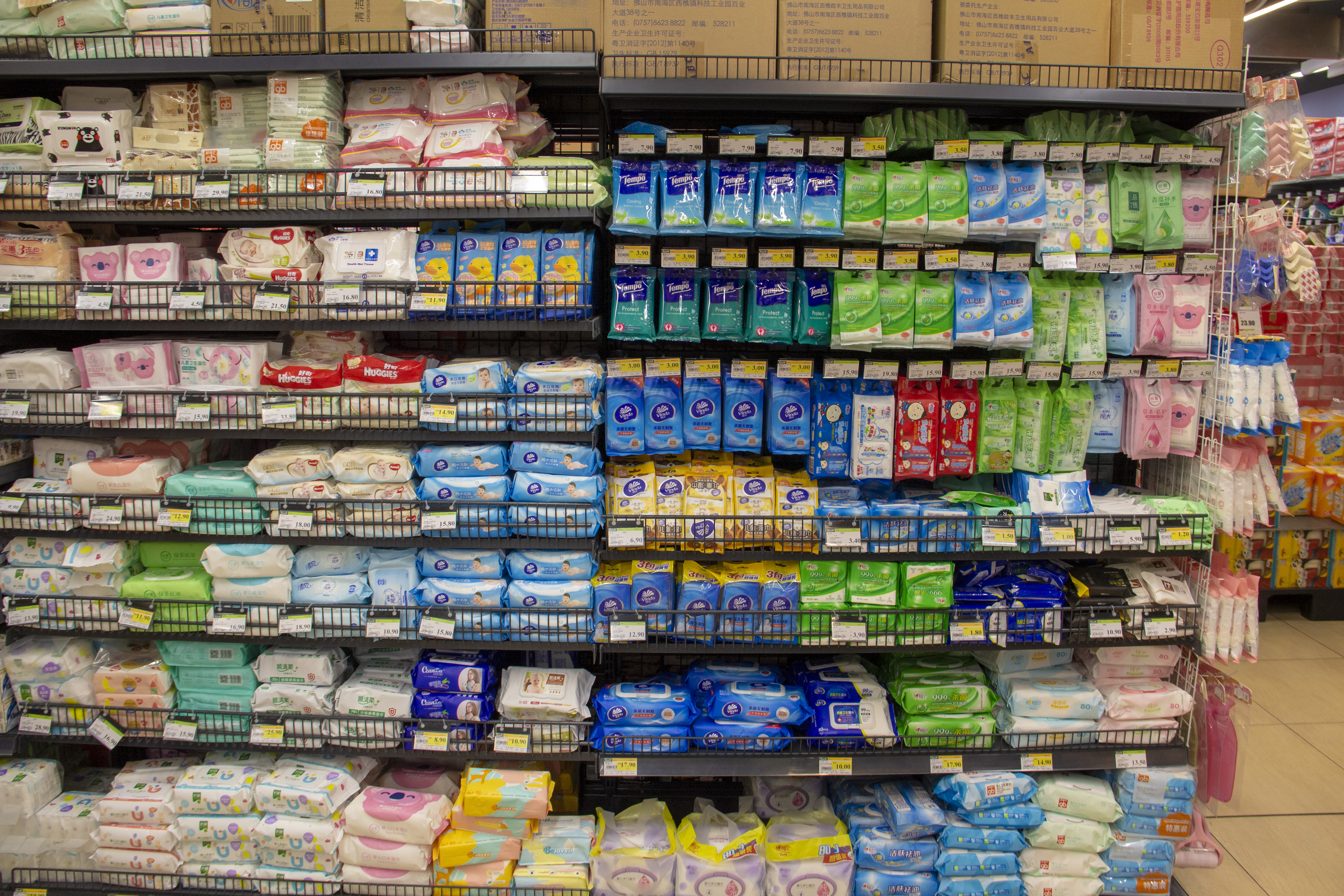
Wet wipes on a shelf

A wet wipe, also known as a moist towelette, disposable wipe, or a baby wipe (in specific circumstances), is a usually one- to two-hand sized moistened generally biodegradable (with the usual exception of baby wipes) "wipe" (a non-woven fabric base (substrate), and a liquid cleansing solution (usually water with a mild soap). They are usually sold in small to medium sized packets or somewhat larger harder plastic tubes. The packets either come with folded wipes or individually wrapped wipes for convenience (these are often flushable) or, in the case of tube dispensers, as a large roll with individual wipes that can be torn off (these are rarely flushable). Wet wipes are used for cleaning purposes like personal hygiene.

In 2013, owing to increasing sales of the product in affluent countries, Consumer Reports reported that efforts to make the wipes "flushable" down the toilet had not entirely succeeded, according to their test.

== Invention ==
American Arthur Julius is seen as the inventor of wet wipes. Julius worked in the cosmetics industry and, in 1957, adjusted a soap portioning machine, putting it in a loft in Manhattan. Julius trademarked the name Wet-Nap in 1958, a name for the product that is still being used. After fine tuning his new hand-cleaning aid together with a mechanic, he unveiled his invention at the 1960 National Restaurant Show in Chicago and, in 1963, started selling Wet-Nap products to Colonel Harland Sanders to be distributed to customers of Kentucky Fried Chicken.

== Production ==
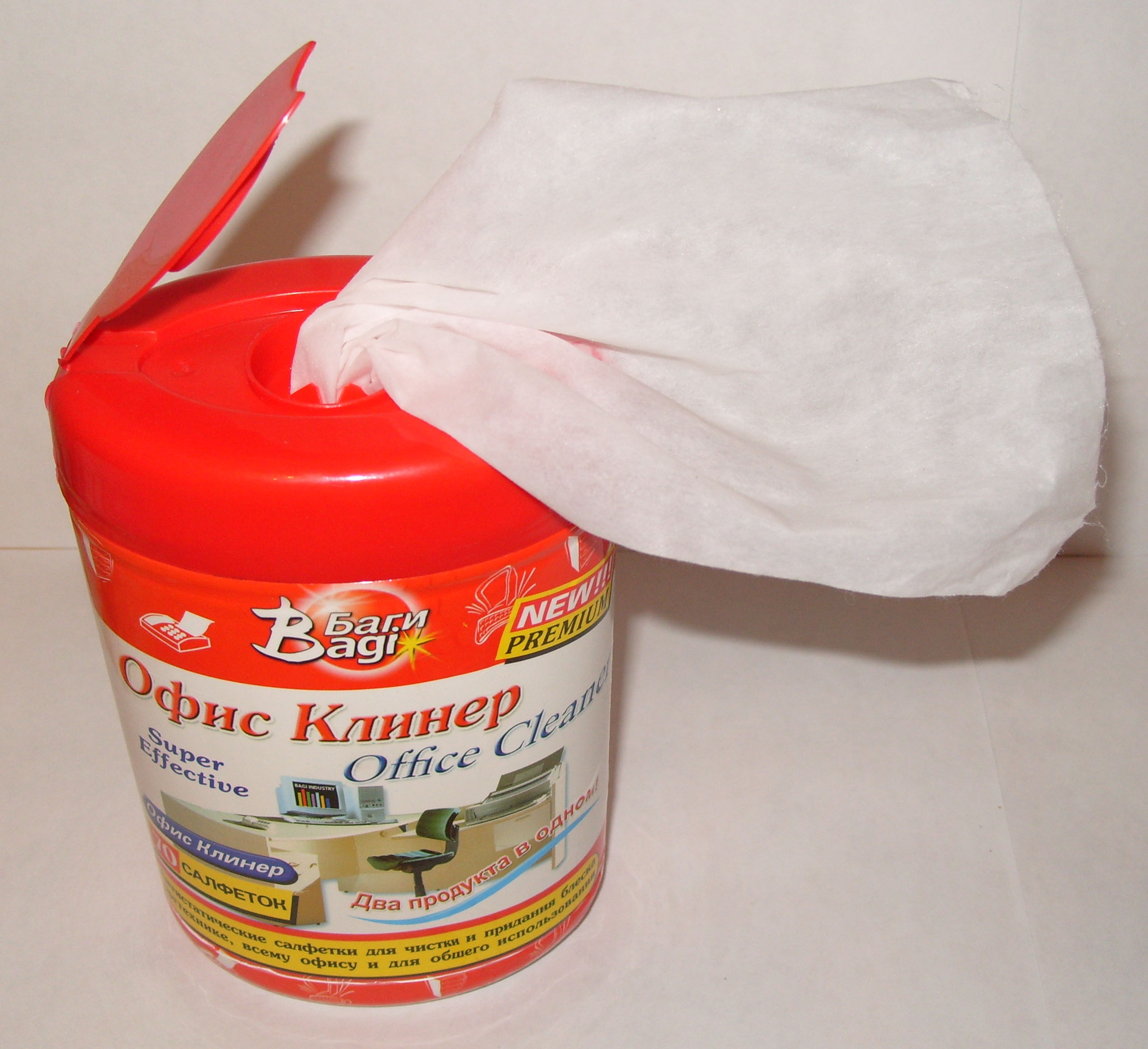
A wet wipe dispenser

Ninety percent of wet wipes on the market are produced from nonwoven fabrics made of polyester or polypropylene.

The material is moistened with water or other liquids (e.g., isopropyl alcohol) depending on the applications. The material may be treated with softeners, lotions, or perfume to adjust the tactile and olfactory properties. Preservatives such as methylisothiazolinone are used to prevent bacterial or fungal growth in the package. The finished wet wipes are folded and put in pocket size package or a box dispenser.

== Uses ==
Wet wipes can serve a number of personal and household purposes. Although marketed primarily for wiping infants' bottoms in diaper changing, it is not uncommon for consumers to also use the product to clean floors, toilet seats, and other surfaces around the home. Parents also use wet wipes for baby care such as wiping up baby vomit and to clean babies' hands and faces.

=== Baby wipes ===
Baby wipes are wet wipes used to cleanse the sensitive skin of infants. These are saturated with solutions anywhere from gentle cleansing ingredients to alcohol-based "cleaners". Baby wipes are typically different pack counts (ranging up to 80 or more sheets per pack), and come with dispensing mechanisms. The origin of baby wipes most likely came in the mid-1950s as more people were travelling and needed a way to clean up on the go. One of the first companies to produce these was a company called Nice-Pak. They made napkin sized paper cloth saturated with a scented skin cleanser.

The first wet-wipe products specifically marketed as baby wipes, such as Kimberly-Clark's Huggies wipes and Procter & Gamble's Pampers wipes, appeared on the market in 1990. As the technology to produce wipes matured and became more affordable, smaller brands began to appear. By the 1990s, most super stores like Kmart and Wal-Mart had their own private label brand of wipes made by other manufacturers. After this period, there was a boom in the industry and many local brands started manufacturing because of low entry barriers.

=== Toilet wet wipes ===
Toilet wet wipes are sometimes preferred to standard toilet paper. Many brands sell toilet wet wipes, claiming they are "flushable". However, they do not decompose in septic tanks as they are made of polyester or polypropylene. In 2013 a Consumer Reports article said that none of the leading brands could pass their test.

Fresh'n was a United States toilet paper substitute, a moistened flushable biodegradable toilet towel, created as a test product by the American Can Company in the early 1970s. It was marketed with the slogan, "I don't use toilet paper." It was to be test marketed in Omaha and Phoenix and while American Can reported a 10% market share initially. Fresh'n never made it to retail shelves in the Arizona test market.

=== Personal hygiene ===
Wet wipes are often included as part of a standard sealed cutlery package offered in restaurants or along with airline meals.

Wet wipes began to be marketed as a luxury alternative to toilet paper in the mid 2000s by companies such as Kimberly-Clark and Procter & Gamble. They are dispensed in the toilets of restaurants, service stations, doctors' offices, and other places with public use.

=== Cleansing pads ===
Cleansing pads are fiber sponges which have been previously soaked with water, alcohol and other active ingredients for a specific intended use. They are ready to use hygiene products and they are simple and convenient solutions to dispose of dirt or other undesirable elements.

There are different types of cleansing pads offered by the beauty industry: make-up removing pads, anti-spot treatments and anti-acne pads that usually contain salicylic acid, vitamins, menthol and other treatments.

=== Healthcare ===
Medical wet wipes are available for various applications. These include alcohol wet wipes, chlorhexidine wipes (for disinfection of surfaces and noninvasive medical devices), and sporicidal wipes. Medical wipes can be used to prevent the spread of pathogens such as norovirus and Clostridioides difficile.

== Effect on sewage systems ==
Water management companies ask people not to flush wet wipes down toilets, as their failure to break apart or dissolve in water can cause sewer blockages known as fatbergs.

Since the mid-2000s, wet wipes such as baby wipes have become more common for use as an alternative to toilet paper in affluent countries, including the United States and the United Kingdom. This usage has in some cases been encouraged by manufacturers, who have labelled some wet wipe brands as "flushable". Wet wipes, when flushed down the toilet, have been reported to clog internal plumbing, septic systems and public sewer systems. The tendency for fat and wet wipes to cling together allegedly encourages the growth of the problematic obstructions in sewers known as "fatbergs". In addition, some brands of wipes contain alcohol, which can kill bacteria and denature enzymes responsible for breaking down solid waste in septic tanks. In the late 2010s, other alternatives such as gel wipe had also come on to the market.

In 2014, a class action suit was filed in the U.S. District Court for the Northern District of Ohio against Target Corporation, and Nice-Pak Products Inc. on behalf of consumers in Ohio who purchased Target-brand flushable wipes. The lawsuit alleged the retailer misled consumers by marking the packaging on its Up & Up brand wipes as flushable and safe for sewer and septic systems. The lawsuit also alleged that the products were a public health hazard because they clogged pumps at municipal waste-treatment facilities. Target and Nice-Pak agreed to settle the case in 2018.

In 2015, the city of Wyoming, Minnesota, launched a class action suit against six companies, including Procter & Gamble, Kimberly-Clark, and Nice-Pak, alleging they were fraudulently promoting their products as "flushable". The city dropped the lawsuit in 2018 after concluding that the city had not experienced damage to its sewer systems or a rise in maintenance costs. Upon announcement of the withdrawal of the suit, an industry trade group representing the manufacturers of the wipes released a statement that disputed the claims that the products are harmful to sewer systems.

The withdrawal by the City of Wyoming and last year's settlement terms of the Perry litigation corroborate what years of testing and field collection studies have shown: flushable wipes are not causing municipal clogs or increased maintenance. To date, despite sensational headlines, no wastewater operator has offered any public evidence that its maintenance issues are impacted by wipes marketed as 'flushable' and passing the industry assessment tests.

— David Rouse, president of INDA, Association of the Nonwoven Fabrics Industry (August 2018)

In 2016, several British water companies including Wessex Water began a campaign advising consumers not to flush wet wipes down toilets because of added maintenance costs.

In 2019, the industry body Water UK announced a new standard for flushable wet wipes. Wipes will need to pass rigorous testing in order to gain a new and approved "Fine to Flush" logo. The standard was discontinued in 2024 because it confused consumers about what wipes they could flush.

== See also ==
- Anal hygiene – Hygienic practices for the anal area
- Gel wipe – Wet wipe alternative
- Handkerchief – Piece of cloth for personal use
- Oshibori – reusable Japanese wet hand towel
- Washlet – a mechanical alternative to wet wipes
