= RSK Group =

UK-based environmental, engineering and technical services group

RSK Group Ltd
- Type: Private company
- Industry: Environmental services
- Founded: 1989
- Headquarters: Helsby, England
- Key people: Alan Ryder (CEO)
- Revenue: £2.4bn (2026)
- Number of employees: 17,000 (2026)
- Website: rskgroup.com

RSK Group Limited is a British professional services company specializing in engineering and sustainability. It has over 200 companies employing 17,000 people and with turnover approaching £2.5bn in the year to April 2026.

== History ==
RSK Group was established in 1989 in Aberdeen by Alan Ryder, and has grown both organically and through an accelerating programme of acquisitions. Today based in Helsby in Cheshire, in 2021 it aimed to become Europe's largest privately owned environmental and engineering business with a £1 billion turnover and employing 10,000 people worldwide by 2025. RSK acquired over 70 businesses in six years from 2016.

In the year to April 2021, RSK's turnover reached £350.5m, up from £274.8m the previous year, and made a pre-tax loss of £18.9m, having made interest payments to backers of £22.8m. In the year to April 2022, RSK made a fifth consecutive pre-tax loss, of £38.1m, on a turnover of £796m inflated due to its dozens of acquisitions. It made £39.9m in interest payments.

In August 2023, RSK announced plans to raise £500m from sales of shares in the business. Supplementing around £500m from Ares Management, this would provide £1bn to fund further acquisitions. It aimed to raise headcount to 40,000 by 2030, expanding internationally in Australia, Europe, Asia, Latin America, Africa and the Middle East.

In the year to April 2023, RSK grew its revenues over 50%, to £1.22bn. Pre-tax losses doubled to £81m, after £74m in interest payments. Founder and CEO Ryder said the group was on track to achieve £5bn revenue by 2030. By March 2024, having completed 24 further acquisitions, RSK employed 10,530 staff.

In June 2024, RSK secured £500m (and an additional £300m debt facility) to fund further strategic takeovers. The preferred equity investment came from a consortium led by Searchlight Capital Partners and Ares Management funds. RSK aimed to increase turnover from £1.2bn to over £5bn by 2030, and to grow to 400 businesses.

In the year to 31 March 2024, RSK recorded a 52% increase in revenue to £1.9bn. The group reported an operating profit of £8m, but loan interest payments totalling £143m contributed to a pre-tax loss of £132m (up from a loss of £90m in 2023).

In the year to 6 April 2025, RSK revenue grew 21% to £2.2bn. Operating profit fell nearly 50% to £4.2m, while investment and finance charges on loans of around £910m meant RSK recorded a pre-tax loss of £124.5m for the period (2024: £132m loss).

The following year, revenue grew 10% to just under £2.5bn, delivering an operating profit of £18m. RSK made 10 acquisitions, costing £172m, in the year to April 2026, increasing net debt to £965m from £734m while pre-tax losses dropped to £93m. The group included over 200 businesses, employing over 17,000 people in more than 40 countries.

=== Acquisitions ===
Following a number of early acquisitions including Structural Soils (2007), Dynamic Sampling and JB Site Investigations (both 2016), RSK Group made its first large acquisition with ADAS in late 2016. ADAS was the UK's largest independent provider of agricultural and environmental consultancy services, bringing with it a then 300-strong workforce that made the RSK Group one of the largest environmental consultancies in the UK in 2016.

In May 2017, the company acquired Acies Civil and Structural, followed in June by the acquisition of KMGP Ltd. In December, RSK completed a trio of deals, acquiring C.J. Associates Geotechnical Ltd, Up and Under Group Ltd and all outstanding (80%) shares of RSKW Ltd.

==== 2018 ====
In 2018, after securing a £140m funding package in the form of a unitranche senior debt facility from funds managed by Ares Capital Europe (Ares) to make around 10 acquisitions, RSK acquired Manchester-based acoustics consultant Cole Jarman and Washington, UK-based 108-strong site investigation specialist Ian Farmer Associates (£10m annual turnover). Specialist ecological and grounds maintenance business, Twig Group, also joined RSK Group in 2018 along with Non-Destructive Testing Services and Copeland Wedge Associates. In October 2018, RSK acquired CAN UK Holdings. In December 2018, the business acquired J&A Pelling, Pelling and Pellings LLP.

==== 2019 ====
In February 2019, the business acquired Dr Tillmans & Partner GmbH. RSK completed the acquisition of tbf Contracting and BTS Group, and in March the group acquired Headland Group and Drilling Supplies. In April RSK acquired Consents Solutions, followed by Biocensus (renamed RSK Biocensus) and AA Milieu-En Adviesbureau BV in May. In June, the business acquired all share capital of Raw Technology (renamed RSK Raw), followed by Geocore Site Investigations in August and Ecologia Environmental Solutions Holdings in September. In October the business acquired ATP Architects + Solutions and Silcock Leedham Group.

==== 2020 ====
In February 2020, RSK acquired Salix River & Wetland Services and a month later in March, acquired consultancy Nicholas O'Dwyer, and Morrison (Falklands). In September, the business acquired WRc (formerly the public-funded Water Research Centre). In December 2020, RSK acquired Black & Veatch's 1,200-strong UK and Asia water and environment businesses, and rebranded it by resurrecting the historic Binnie brand.

==== 2021 ====
In early 2021, RSK acquired CAS Ltd CR Civil Engineering (200 staff), the Enviresearch group (19), and EDP Health, Safety and Environment Consultants (50), and in April, RSK Orbital, SkyVision International, The Scan Station, and Smith & Kennedy Architects. In May 2021, the business announced a quartet of acquisitions: UK planning and landscaping services provider Stephenson Halliday, UK chartered surveyor Waldrams, German geotechnical consultants Althoff & Lang GbR and New Zealand risk management company Quality Solutions International (QSI). In June, RSK acquired Ireland-based Minerex Environmental. In July, in its tenth deal of the year, it acquired UK specialist geotechnical contractor TechnikGS. In August RSK acquired CS2 chartered surveyors and Leap Environmental.

In August 2021, RSK agreed the largest private credit backed, sustainability-linked financing deal on the market to date with Ares European Direct Lending serving as sole lenders of £1 billion available debt facilities to boost the growth of the business. The new debt facilities include an annual margin review based on the achievement of sustainability targets, which are broadly focused on carbon intensity reduction and continual improvement to health and safety management and ethics. RSK anticipates interest savings in excess of £500,000 per year and has committed to donate a minimum of 50% of this margin benefit toward sustainability-related initiatives or charitable causes.

In September 2021, RSK acquired 800-strong, £200m turnover UK water business MWH Treatment, formerly part of MWH Constructors along with EiB and Electrokinetic. In November 2021, RSK announced six acquisitions; renewable ground pump technologists Carbon Zero Consulting, water specialists Envireau Water, specialist waste management Enviroflow, traffic management services business Streetwise, surveying and engineering services business Centara and tree surgery and management company Hi-Line Contractors S.W. In December 2021, RSK made three acquisitions: Optisol Services, a solar farm maintenance and civil works contractor; Non Entry Systems Limited, which makes automated equipment for cleaning of difficult access areas; and ATV Contract Services, a landscape management firm.

==== 2022 ====
In January 2022, RSK took over Singleton Clamp & Partners, a transportation planning, highway and drainage consultancy with 45 employees in Manchester, Leeds and London. In February, RSK acquired Fishtek, a Devon-based consultant specialising in marine environments and designing fish passes. In March 2022, RSK took over Ireland's 26-strong Inis Environmental Consultants, and UK-based Richard Allitt Associates and 70-strong M&E specialist Ceetech.

In May 2022, it was announced RSK had acquired the France-based environmental consultancy company, ADEV Environment. In August 2022, RSK acquired 125-strong UK scaffolding contractor MG Scaffolding, and Cardiff-based facilities and environmental services management company MSS Group.

In September 2022, RSK announced the acquisition of Milestone Communications, specialists in civil, electrical and mechanical engineering for telecoms and renewable energy suppliers, South Wales-based Spencer Group, an environmental services and geotechnical contractor, and specialist infrastructure communications firm Copper Consultancy. In October 2022, it acquired civil, structural, geo-environmental and engineering consultant Travis Baker. At this point, RSK Group comprised over 175 companies, employing 10,000 people.

==== 2023 ====
In January 2023, RSK acquired 260-strong temporary site services specialist WysePower. In February 2023, RSK purchased BMG Research. The social research company was founded in Birmingham in 1988, and also has offices in London.

In June 2023, RSK acquired a 400-strong UK rail track repair and renewal contractor, 1stInRail. In August 2023, RSK acquired the Aberdeen-based specialist energy engineering services company, PD&MS. In September 2023, RSK acquired Ireland's Larsen Water Management and Global Infrastructure Group, a £50m turnover railway contractor active in the UK and Ireland. In October 2023, RSK acquired 125-strong Jedburgh-based civil engineering contractor RJT Excavations.

==== 2024–2025 ====
In August 2024, RSK acquired EB7, a London-based property consultant specialising in planning issues related to daylight and sunlight. In February 2025, RSK acquired the 110-strong N-Able Group comprising ECD Architects and Keegans, a building consultancy specialising in retrofit and building/fire safety. Other acquisitions during the financial year included Apollo Strategic Communications, 3BM Group, Kendall Kingscott, Edge Impact, Pegasys, and Elsym Installations.

In June 2025, RSK announced the acquisition of AGEA, an environmental consulting firm with a strong presence in Latin America. In November 2025, RSK Group announced it had acquired the 700-strong rail and highways business Octavius Infrastructure from Sullivan Street Partners.

==== 2026 ====
In September 2026, RSK acquired 175-strong highways contractor Mason Street Furniture (MSF) for an undisclosed sum.
