= Gel wipe =

Wet wipe alternative

Gel wipe is a moisturizing gel applied to dry toilet paper for cleaning purposes, like personal hygiene, or to reduce skin irritation from diarrhea. It was developed in the 2010s as an environmentally sensitive alternative to wet wipes.

== History ==
Estonian Siim Saat is seen as the inventor of gel wipe in 2011. In 2016, he was among seven entrepreneurs in the world nominated for an award by the Healthcare Startup Society in London at the Healthcare Startup Conference. Gel wipe is seen as the solution to wet wipe pollution.

== Uses ==
Although marketed primarily for wiping bottoms, it is not uncommon to use it against skin rash, in the case of diarrhea or even as a substitute for water and soap on hiking trips.

Gel wipes began to be marketed as a complementary hygiene product for toilet paper by SATU laboratory, as a luxury option by St Joseph's Toiletries or hipster product by Zum Bum, and Zero Taboos that makes Wipegel. Many adults now use gel wipes with toilet paper as an alternative to wet wipes that cause environmental and sewer problems. All wet wipes sold as "flushable" in the UK have so far failed the water industry's disintegration tests, the BBC has found. A study by Ryerson University tested 23 wipes with the "flushable" label and found only two that partially disintegrated.

== See also ==
- Anal hygiene
