= Grease trap =

Plumbing device

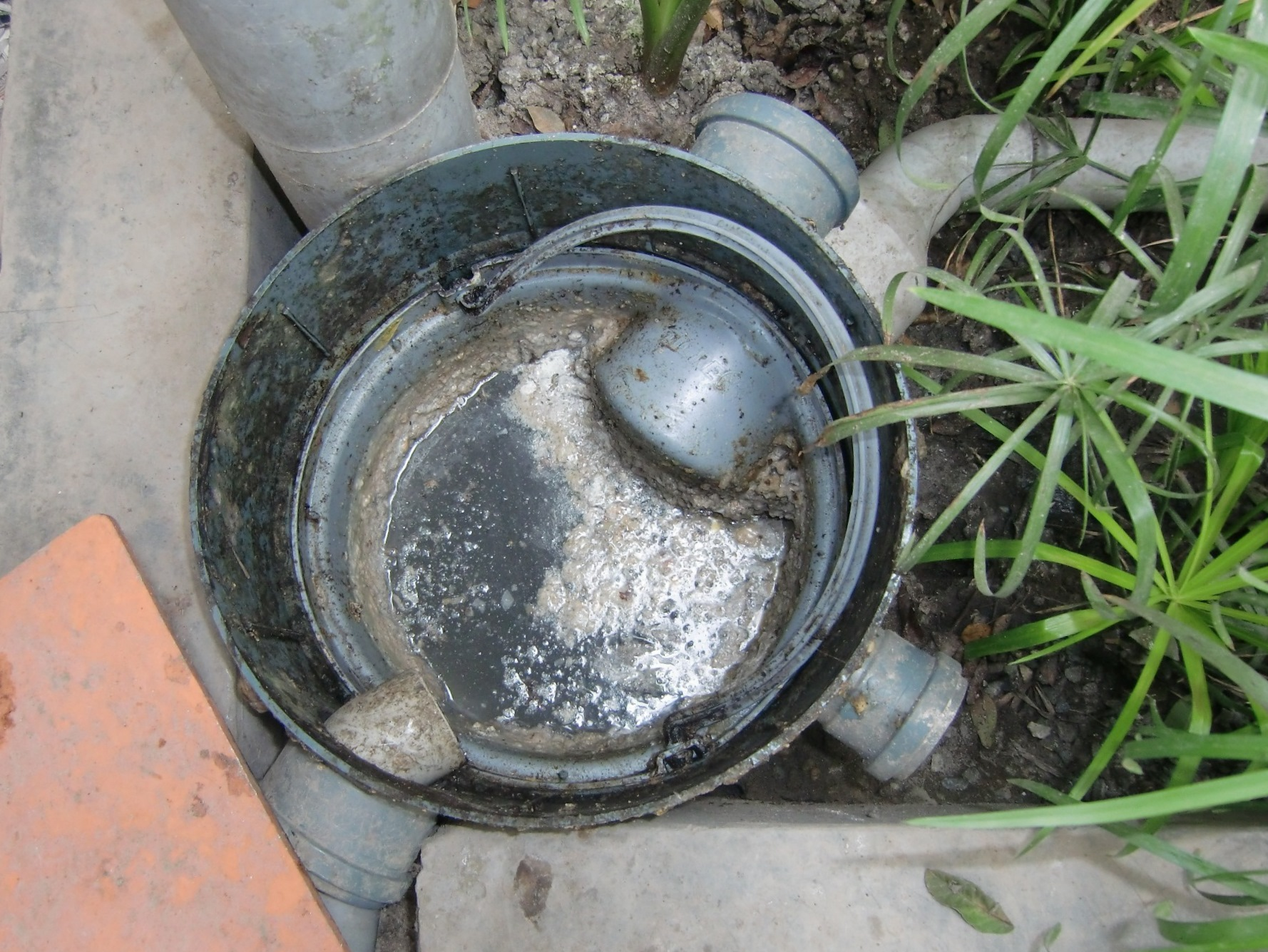
Grease trap for greywater in Lima, Peru

A grease trap (also known as a grease interceptor, grease recovery device, grease capsule, or grease converter) is a plumbing device (a type of trap) designed to intercept most greases, solids, and other high viscosity fluids before they enter a wastewater disposal system. Common wastewater contains small amounts of oils which enter into septic tanks and treatment facilities to form a floating scum layer. This scum layer is very slowly digested and broken down by microorganisms in the anaerobic digestion process. Large amounts of oil from food preparation in restaurants can overwhelm a septic tank or treatment facility, causing the release of untreated sewage into the environment. High-viscosity fats and cooking grease such as lard solidify when cooled, and can combine with other disposed solids to block drain pipes.

Grease traps have been in use since the Victorian era; in the late 1800s, Nathaniel Whiting was granted the first patent. The quantity of fats, oils, greases, and solids (FOGS) that enter sewers is decreased by the traps. They consist of boxes within the drain run that flows between the sinks in a kitchen and the sewer system. They have only kitchen wastewater flowing through them and do not serve any other drainage system, such as toilets. They can be made from various materials, such as stainless steel, plastics, concrete and cast iron. They range from 35-liter capacity to 45,000 litres and greater. They can be located above ground, below ground, inside the kitchen, or outside the building.

== Types ==
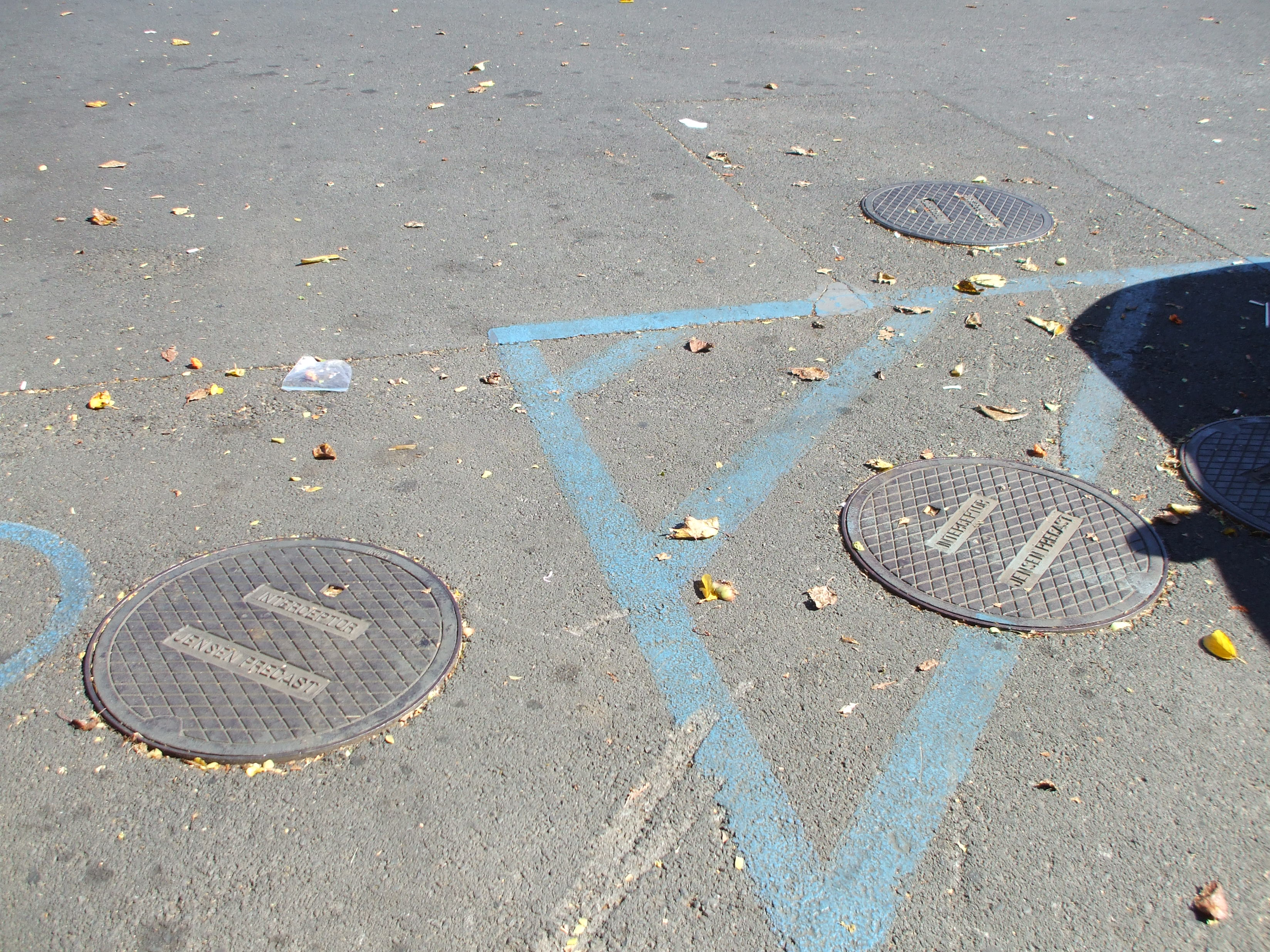
Manhole covers of a grease trap outside a restaurant.

There are three primary types of devices. The most common are those specified by American Society Of Mechanical Engineers (ASME), utilizing baffles, or a proprietary inlet diffuser.

Grease trap sizing is based on the size of the 2- or 3-compartment sink, dishwasher, pot sinks, and mop sinks. Many manufacturers and vendors offer online sizing tools to make these calculations easy. The cumulative flow rates of these devices, as well as overall grease retention capacity (in pounds or kilograms) are considered. Currently, ASME Standard (ASME A112.14.3) is being adopted by both of the national model plumbing codes (International Plumbing Code and Uniform Plumbing Code) that cover most of the US. This standard requires that grease interceptors remove a minimum of 90% of incoming FOGs. It also requires that grease interceptors are third-party tested and certified to 90 days compliance with the standard pumping. This third-party testing must be conducted by a recognized and approved testing laboratory.

Passive grease traps are generally smaller, point-of-use units used under three-compartment sinks or adjacent to dishwashers in kitchens.

Large in-ground tanks, usually 500–2,000 US gallons (2,000–8,000 L), are also passive grease interceptors. These units, made of concrete, fiberglass, or steel, have greater grease and solid storage capacities for high-flow applications such as a restaurant or hospital store. They are commonly called gravity interceptors. Interceptors require a retention time of 30 minutes to allow the fats, oils, grease, and food solids to settle in the tank. As more wastewater enters the tank, the grease-free water is pushed out of the tank. The rotting brown grease inside a grease trap or grease interceptor must be pumped out on a scheduled basis. The brown grease is not recycled and goes to landfills. On average 300 to 400 pounds (140 to 180 kg) of brown grease goes to landfill annually from each restaurant.

Passive grease traps and passive grease interceptors must be emptied and cleaned when 25% full. As the passive devices fill with fats, oils, and grease, they become less productive for grease recovery. A full grease trap no longer prevents FOG from entering the sanitary sewer system. The emptied contents or "brown grease" is considered hazardous waste in many jurisdictions.

A third system type, hydromechanical grease interceptors (HGIs), has become more popular in recent years as restaurants open in more nontraditional sites. Often, these sites don't have space for a large concrete grease interceptor. HGIs take up less space and hold more grease as a percent of their liquid capacity — often between 70 and 85% of their liquid capacity or even higher as in the case of some "Trapzilla" models. These interceptors are 3rd-party certified to meet efficiency standards. Most are made out of durable plastic or fiberglass, lasting much longer than concrete gravity grease interceptors. They are usually lightweight and easy to install without heavy equipment. Most manufacturers test beyond the minimum standard to demonstrate the full capacity of the unit.

Finally, automatic grease removal devices or recovery units offer an alternative to hydromechanical grease interceptors in kitchens. While their tanks passively intercept grease, they are equipped with an automatic, motorized mechanism that removes grease from the tank and collects it in a separate container. These interceptors must meet the same efficiency standards as a passive HGI, but must also meet an additional standard that proves they are capable of skimming the grease effectively.

They are often designed to be installed unobtrusively in a commercial kitchen, in a corner, or under a sink. The upfront cost of these units can be higher, but kitchen staff can handle the minimal maintenance required, avoiding pumping fees. The compact design of these units allows them to fit in tight spaces, and simplifies installation.

== Uses ==
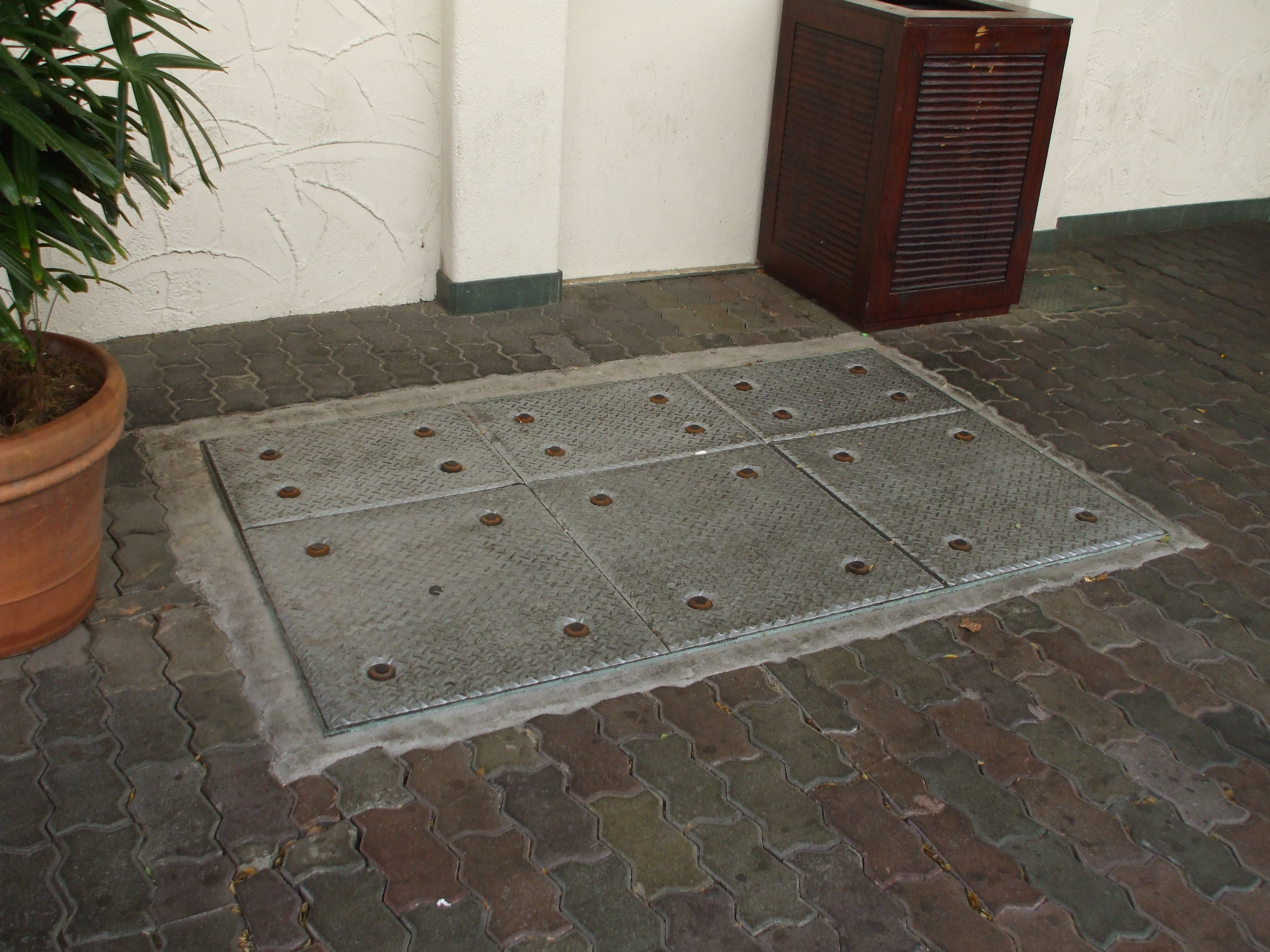
In-ground grease trap outside of a shop

Restaurant and food service kitchens produce waste grease which is present in the drain lines from various sinks, dishwashers and cooking equipment such as combi ovens and commercial woks. Rotisserie ovens have also become big sources of waste grease. If not removed, the grease can clump and cause blockages and back-up in the sewer.

In the US, sewers back up annually an estimated 400,000 times, and municipal sewer overflows on 40,000 occasions. The U.S. Environmental Protection Agency has determined that sewer pipe blockages are the leading cause of sewer overflows, and grease is the primary cause of sewer blockages in the United States. Even if accumulated FOG does not escalate into blockages and sanitary sewer overflows, it can disrupt wastewater utility operations and increase operations and maintenance requirements.

For these reasons, depending on the country, nearly all municipalities require commercial kitchen operations to use some type of interceptor device to collect grease before it enters sewers. Where FOG is a concern in the local wastewater system, communities have established inspection programs to ensure that these grease traps and/or interceptors are being routinely maintained.

It is estimated 50% of all sewer overflows are caused by grease blockages, with over 10 billion US gallons (38,000,000 m^{3}) of raw sewage spills annually.

== Method of operation ==
When the outflow from the kitchen sink enters the grease trap, the solid food particles sink to the bottom, while lighter grease and oil float to the top. The relatively grease-free water is then fed into the normal septic system.The food solids at the bottom and floating oil and grease must be periodically removed in a manner similar to septic tank pumping. A traditional grease trap is not a food disposal unit. Unfinished food must be scraped into the garbage or food recycling bin. Gravy, sauces and food solids must be scraped off dishes before entering the sink or dishwasher.

To maintain some degree of efficiency, there has been a trend to specify larger traps. Unfortunately, providing a large tank for the effluent to stand also means that food waste has time to settle to the bottom of the tank, reducing available volume and adding to clean-out problems. Also, rotting food contained within an interceptor breaks down, producing toxic waste (such as sulfur gases); hydrogen sulfide combines with the water present to create sulfuric acid. This attacks mild steel and concrete materials, resulting in "rot out", On the other hand, polyethylene has acid-resisting properties. A larger interceptor is not a better interceptor. In most cases, multiple interceptors in series will separate grease much better.

Because it has been in the trap for some time, grease thus collected will be contaminated and is unsuitable for further use. This type of grease is called brown grease.

== Brown grease ==
Waste from passive grease traps and gravity interceptors is called brown grease. Brown grease is rotted food solids in combination with fats, oils, and grease (FOG). Brown grease is pumped from the traps and interceptors by grease pumping trucks. Unlike the collected yellow grease, the majority of brown grease goes to landfill sites. New facilities and new technology are beginning to allow brown grease to be recycled.
