= Foundation for Water Research =

England-based charity

The Foundation for Water Research (FWR), an independent membership based charity dedicated to education and knowledge transfer, is based in Marlow, Buckinghamshire. In 2022 the FWR was taken over by the Institution of Environmental Sciences.

== History ==
FWR was created in 1989 as part of the privatisation of the Water Research Centre. One function was to facilitate the connection between FWR members, the Water Companies and the newly created WRc Plc for the duration of a five-year Core Research Programme. In addition FWR commissioned research at Universities and other laboratories.

In 2001 FWR became a registered charity, ceased funding of research projects and concentrated on an Educational and Knowledge Transfer role. In 2022 the Institution of Environmental Sciences was named as the inheritor organisation to the FWR.

== Outputs ==
- 1989 to 1994: WRc Core Programme (FRnnnn series).
- 1993 to 1999: Commissioned Research (FRINV, FRW series)
- 1994 to 2018: Urban Pollution Management Manual (UPM). Following a major research and development programme partnership funded by the whole of the water industry the 1st edition appeared in 1995 It brought to the fore many new planning concepts and addressed major environmental issues arising from urban drainage and wet weather. The updated 2nd edition (CD-ROM) was published in 1998 and the extensively updated and more easily accessible web based 3rd edition was published in 2012 with a further substantial update in 2018.
- 1999 to date: Reviews Of Current Knowledge (ROCKs). Booklets, for the general public, on water and environmental topics, commissioned from experts in their field.(FRR series)
- 2002 to 2010 Wallingford Pollution Users Group, Reports and Seminars. WaPUG series..
- 2004 to date: FWR Guides - Non-technical introduction to topics related to water supply, wastewater and water environments. (FRG series)
- 2005 to date: Quarterly Newsletters carrying articles on topical items of environmental interest and also a monthly Events Diary.
- 2012 to 2020: Host for South Chilterns Catchment Partnership
- 2014: Water Quality Regulation Handbook

== Information resources ==
The FWR mission is to advance the education of the public in science, engineering and management of water through specialist forums, reviews of current knowledge, publishing and information support. FWR maintains a membership of water industry and environmental experts who meet regularly (typically three times a year) and review issues relating to water and the environment. Meetings of the Wastewater Innovation Forum include topical presentations on developments in water and the environment which are published on the FWR website. Proceedings of these meetings are published and maintained on the Company web site.
