= Fatberg =

Mass of congealed fat in sewers

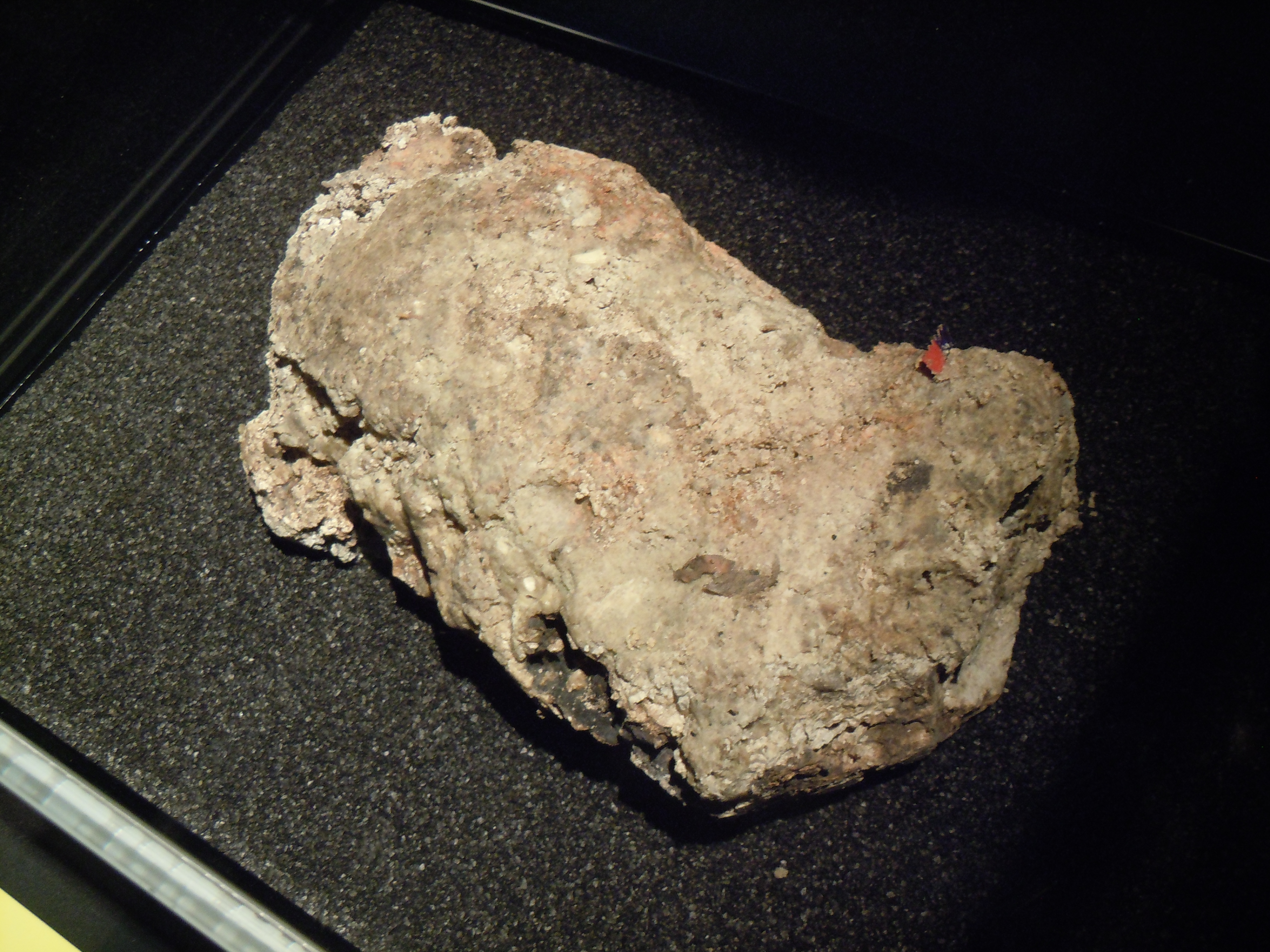
A dried section of the Whitechapel fatberg, on display at the Museum of London

A fatberg is a rock-like mass of waste matter in a sewer system formed by the combination of flushed non-biodegradable solids (such as wet wipes) with fat, oil, and grease (FOG) deposits. The handling of FOG waste and the buildup of its deposits are a long-standing problem in waste management, with "fatberg" a more recent neologism. Fatbergs have formed in sewers worldwide, with the rise in usage of disposable (so-called "flushable") wet wipes. Several prominent examples were discovered in the 2010s in Great Britain, their formation accelerated by aging Victorian sewers. Fatbergs are costly to remove, and they have given rise to public awareness campaigns about flushable waste.

== Formation ==
Fatbergs form at the rough surfaces of sewers where the fluid flow becomes turbulent. In pipes and tubes with smooth inner linings, fluid near the containing wall flows only slightly slower than fluid in the central channel of the pipe; thus, the whole volume of fluid flows smoothly and freely. When fluid encounters an obstruction, a resulting swirl of water starts trapping debris. Fatbergs occur in sewer systems around the globe, in cities and smaller towns.

An obstruction can be any type of rough surface capable of snagging debris. In brick or concrete sewers, there may be surplus cement drips, damaged brickwork, or loose mortar joints damaged by frost heave. In any subsurface pipe, even of the most advanced design, penetration by foreign intrusions such as tree roots is a commonplace cause of a fatberg blockage.

Fatbergs are not just the result of fats that have congealed through cooling. The lipids in fatbergs have undergone a process of saponification. Fatbergs thus require four main components: calcium, free fatty acids, FOG, and water. Comprising not only wet wipes and fat, fatbergs may contain other items that do not break apart or dissolve when flushed down the toilet, such as sanitary napkins, cotton buds, needles, condoms, and food waste from garbage disposal units washed down kitchen sinks. The resulting lumps of congealed material can be as strong as concrete, and require specialist equipment to remove. In the United States, almost half of all sewer blockages are caused by grease, combined with the ever-growing use of wipes that end up in sewer systems.

== Impact ==
Fatbergs can cause blockages in sewer systems. Giant fatbergs have blocked sewers in London, New York, Denver, Valencia, and Melbourne. Blocked fat reacts with the lining of the pipe and undergoes saponification, converting the oil into a solid, soap-like substance. Grease and fat blockages can cause sanitary sewer overflows, in which sewage is discharged into the environment without treatment.

== Use in industry ==
Fatbergs have been considered as a source of fuel, specifically biogas. Most of the fatberg discovered in Whitechapel in London in 2017, weighing 130 tonnes (128 long tons; 143 short tons) and stretching more than 250 metres (820 ft), was destroyed, but some of it was converted into biodiesel.

In the UK, sterilized fatberg treated with a specialized bacteria produces a chemical with a pine-like smell, which can be used as an ingredient in perfumes.

== Mitigation ==
Fatbergs can be mitigated through public awareness campaigns about flushable waste and grease traps for filtration at the source. Many U.S. municipalities require restaurants and food processing businesses to use grease interceptors and regulate the disposal of FOG in the sewer system. Campaigns have been launched against wet wipes because of their effect on sewer systems, including by Surfers Against Sewage, the Marine Conservation Society and other environmental NGOs who called on the UK's Advertising Standards Authority to end "misleading" branding and packaging.

In 2022, Australia and New Zealand developed a product labelling standard to help determine if a product is flushable.

== Etymology ==
Fatberg is a portmanteau of the words fat and iceberg. The word was used in 2008 to describe "large, rock-like lumps of cooking fat" washing up on beaches in Wales, and by 2010 was used in reference to sewer-blocking fat deposits in London.

The word was added to Oxford Dictionaries Online in 2015. The term is used by authorities at Thames Water and South West Water, both in southern England.

== Notable fatbergs ==
- 6 August 2013: A fatberg roughly the size of a bus that weighed 15 tonnes (17 short tons), consisting of food fat and wet wipes, was discovered in drains under London Road in Kingston upon Thames, London.
- 1 September 2014: A solid mass of waste fat, wet wipes, food, tennis balls and wood planks, the size of a Boeing 747 aeroplane was discovered and cleared by sanitation workers in a drain beneath an 80-metre (260 ft) section of road in Shepherd's Bush, London.
- 3 September 2014: The sewerage system beneath Melbourne, Australia was clogged by a large mass of fat, grease and waste.
- January 2015: As part of a campaign against drain blocking, Welsh Water released a video showing a fatberg in drains in Cardiff.
- April 2015: A 40-metre-long (130 ft) fatberg was removed from sewers under Chelsea. It took over two months to remove, and the damage it caused cost an estimated £400,000 to repair.
- July 2015: A 120-metre-long (390 ft) fatberg was discovered in Welshpool in mid-Wales.
- January 2016: A blockage caused by a fatberg near Newcastle, New South Wales, Australia, damaged the Eleebana sewage pumping station. The fatberg "weighed about a tonne [1.1 short tons] and took four hours to remove" by crane.

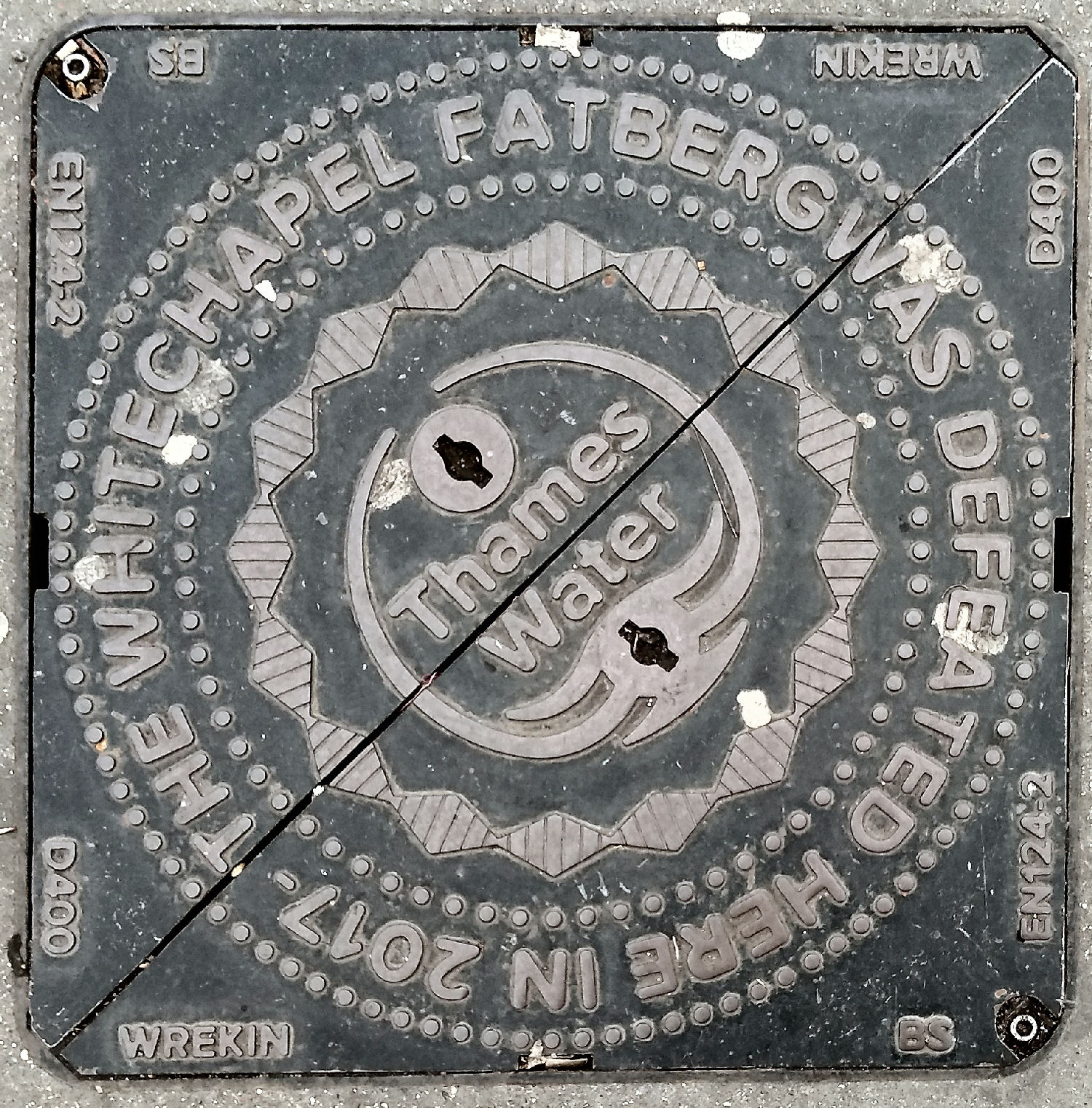
Whitechapel Fatberg memorial manhole cover

- September 2017: A 250-metre-long (820 ft) fatberg weighing over 130 tonnes (140 short tons) was found under Whitechapel, London. Even working seven days a week at a cost of £1 million per month, officials estimated it would take two months to destroy it. Two pieces of the fatberg were cut off on 4 October 2017 and, after several weeks of drying, were displayed at the Museum of London from 9 February 2018 through June 2018, as part of the museum's City Now City Future season. According to curator Vyki Sparkes, the fatberg became one of the museum's most popular exhibits.
- September 2017: A fatberg of congealed fat, wet wipes, and waste was discovered under the streets of Baltimore, Maryland, US, that caused the spillage of 1.2 million US gallons (4.5 million litres; 1.0 million imperial gallons) of sewage into Jones Falls.
- April 2018: A fatberg discovered under South Bank in London is suspected to be larger than the one found under Whitechapel.
- 12 September 2018: Workers in Macomb County, Michigan, US, discovered a fatberg 100 feet long, 11 feet wide and as much as 6 feet tall. The Michigan Science Center launched a 'fatberg' exhibit in December 2018, which included real pieces from the mass found in September.
- December 2018: Sewer workers discovered a fatberg in Sidmouth, Devon that was 64 metres (210 ft) long. Workers took eight weeks to remove it. It was the largest fatberg discovered in the UK outside a major city, and the largest in the history of South West Water.
- February 2019: The largest fatberg in the UK was discovered in a sewer at Birchall Street in Liverpool. It weighed 400 tonnes (440 short tons) and was 250 metres (820 ft) long. It proved to be difficult to break down using conventional tools and equipment. It was finally removed in May 2021 using a new method of clearing, which consisted of workers feeding a steel rope through it and then cutting it with a jet.
- December 2019: A large fatberg in the north of England was reported by United Utilities under HM Prison Manchester. The 52-metre-long (170 ft) fatberg was estimated to weigh "around the same as three elephants", taking several weeks to remove fully.
- April 2020: A 42-tonne (46-short-ton) fatberg the size of a petrol tanker was discovered in Melbourne, Australia. Its unusually large size in relation to other Australian blockages (far exceeding the 2014 and 2016 Australian fatbergs) was blamed primarily on the shortage of toilet paper caused by the COVID-19 outbreak.
- 26 June 2020: Two years after a large mass of fat was jet cleaned from Gisborne's sewer network in New Zealand, a half-tonne fatberg built up in the same place. The second fatberg caused an overflow of the wastewater system, which the Gisborne District Council attributed to COVID-19 claiming that they "had significant problems with pump stations blocking because more people were at home and their behaviour had changed."
- October 2020: A 10-tonne fatberg made up of grease, fat, and wet wipes was removed from sewers under Cadogan Place in London, England.
- February 2021: A "huge and disgusting" fatberg described as having the same weight as a bungalow was removed from under Yabsley Street in Canary Wharf, London, England.
- April 2021: A giant fatberg, weighing about 300 tonnes, was found to be clogging a sewer in the Hodge Hill area of Birmingham, England. Severn Trent commented that it was estimated to be one of the biggest blockages they had ever dealt with.
- October 2023: The Galway City Tribune reported that a fatberg had washed up on Silverstrand Beach in Ireland. Specific concern from pet owners walking their dogs on the beach led to the removal of the lump by local residents.
- October 2024: Thousands of black golf ball-sized pieces of debris washed ashore at two popular beaches in Sydney, Australia. Initially feared to be "tarballs" from a petrochemical leak, later testing by the New South Wales Environment Protection Authority determined the balls to be fatbergs.
- February 2025: A fatberg in Perth caused a Bryan Adams concert to be cancelled because of public health concerns. A separate fatberg also caused flooding in a nearby hospital the day before.
- December 2025: A fatberg in east London was discovered weighing about 100 tonnes.
