= Water UK =

Trade association for the water industry in the UK

Water UK is the trade association representing all of the water and wastewater companies of the United Kingdom. It has 25 full members plus four associate members. It was established in 1998. The current Chief Executive is David Henderson who was appointed in February 2023. The current Chair is Ruth Kelly who was appointed in March 2023.

== Role and activities ==
Water UK represents the collective interests of the UK water industry, engaging with government, regulators, and other stakeholders on policy, regulation, and long-term strategic issues affecting water and wastewater services. It provides a forum for collaboration among water companies and acts as a central point of coordination on industry-wide challenges.

The organisation contributes to consultations and policy development relating to environmental protection, water resources, infrastructure investment, customer service standards, and public health. It also promotes the sharing of best practice across the sector and communicates industry positions on legislative and regulatory proposals.

== Governance ==
Water UK is governed by a board comprising senior leaders from member companies, with overall strategic oversight provided by the Chair. Day-to-day operations are led by the Chief Executive and executive leadership team.

The organisation represents collective industry views and does not act on behalf of individual companies.

== Membership ==
Water UK’s full membership includes all major water and wastewater service providers operating across England, Scotland, Wales, and Northern Ireland. Associate membership is open to organisations connected to the water sector, including suppliers and service providers.

Membership enables companies to participate in policy forums, technical working groups, and industry initiatives coordinated by Water UK.

== Policy areas ==
Water UK’s work covers a range of policy areas, including:

- Environmental regulation and water quality
- Climate change adaptation and resilience
- Water resources, leakage, and drought management
- Infrastructure investment and asset management
- Customer affordability and vulnerability
- Innovation and efficiency in the water sector

The organisation publishes consultation responses, industry briefings, and policy reports addressing these topics.

== Public engagement ==
Water UK engages with the public and media to provide information about the water industry and its role in delivering water and wastewater services. It also supports industry-wide public information campaigns, including those focused on water efficiency and protecting sewer infrastructure.

== History ==
Water UK was established in 1998 following changes to the structure and regulation of the UK water industry, consolidating earlier representative bodies into a single organisation covering the UK water sector. Since its formation, it has evolved alongside regulatory reforms and increasing environmental and resilience requirements placed on the industry.
