= Neste Renewable Diesel =

Vegetable oil refining fuel production process

Neste MY Renewable Diesel (formerly NExBTL) is a vegetable oil refining fuel production process commercialized by the Finnish oil and refining company Neste. Whether as an admixture or in its pure form, the fuel is able to supplement or partially replace conventional diesel without problems. Neste guarantees that every gallon sold meets ASTM D975 and EN 15940 specifications in compliance with OEM standards.

Despite the former name BTL, the feedstock is vegetable oil and waste animal fats, not whole plants. However, fuel quality is equal to the synthetic Fischer-Tropsch BTL and GTL diesel fuels.

== Process ==
Neste Renewable Diesel is produced in a patented vegetable oil refining process. Chemically, it entails direct catalytic hydrodeoxygenation (hydrogenolysis) of plant oils, which are triglycerides, into the corresponding alkanes and propane. The glycerol chain of the triglyceride is hydrogenated to the corresponding C3 alkane, propane — there is no glycerol sidestream. This process removes oxygen from the oil; the diesel is not an oxygenate like traditional transesterified FAME biodiesel. Catalytic isomerization into branched alkanes is then done to adjust the cloud point in order to meet winter operability requirements. As it is chemically identical to ideal conventional diesel, it requires no modification or special precautions for the engine.

== Production ==
Two refineries in Porvoo, Finland were brought on stream in 2007 and 2009, each with a capacity of 0.2 million tons per year. Two larger refineries, with annual production of 0.8 million tons both, were brought on stream in Singapore and Rotterdam in 2010 and 2011, respectively.

== Emissions ==
Neste has estimated that the use of NExBTL diesel cuts greenhouse gas emissions by 40 to 90 percent in comparison to fossil based diesel.

Due to the chemistry of the process, the renewable diesel is pure alkane and contains no aromatics, oxygen (although oxygen would have promoted cleaner combustion) or sulfur.

== Cloud point ==
The cloud point (or gel point) can be adjusted down to −40 °C (−40 °F) during the manufacturing process, compared to petrodiesel's cloud point of −30 °C (−22 °F), which could improve the cloud point of diesel when blended. The cloud point is the temperature when the wax precipitates out of the fuel in the form of small wax crystals, making the fuel cloudy and more difficult to move within the fuel lines and systems of vehicles. The lower the cloud point of a particular fuel is, the more suitable it is in colder environments.

== Feedstocks ==
A mix of palm oil, rapeseed oil, and waste fat from the food industry can be used. Initially, palm oil was the principal (90%) feedstock, although its share was reduced to 53% by 2013 and to less than 20% by 2017.

However, the EU biofuels industry has increased its use of palm oil by 365% during the years 2006–2012, from 0.4 to 1.9 million tonnes per year, and the trend is increasing. Also note that categorising Palm Fatty Acid Distillate, PFAD, as waste is controversial since it can be used to make e.g. soap, candles and animal fodder. In the UK PFAD is classified as a bi-product). PFAD is also omitted from sustainability requirements regarding biodiversity and high carbon stock areas (HCV).

Palm oil may endanger the carbon neutrality of the fuel if forest is cleared and swamps drained to make way for palm plantations. In response to this concern, Neste has joined the Round Table on Sustainable Palm Oil (RSPO) to certify that the palm oil is produced in a carbon-neutral, environmentally responsible manner. Neste purchases most of its palm oil from IOI, but requires a separate production chain for the RSPO-certified palm oil, in order not to create demand for rainforest destruction.

Deforestation would release carbon to the atmosphere, and reduce the overall carbon binding capacity of the land, thus it would be counterproductive with respect to the carbon balance. In 2007, Greenpeace protested the use of palm oil, concluding the potential for deforestation remains. According to Greenpeace, increasing the production of palm oil reduces the available land area, so indirectly generates demand for rainforest destruction, even if the palm oil itself is rainforest-certified. Greenpeace noted RSPO is voluntary organization and claimed government regulation in palm oil producing countries, such as Indonesia, cannot be relied on because of political corruption. Greenpeace also claimed palm oil diesel can actually produce three to 10 times more carbon dioxide emissions than petrodiesel because of the indirect effects of clearing of swamps, forest fires and indirect generation of demand for land area. Greenpeace demands that Neste should use domestic feedstocks such as rapeseed oil or biogas, instead. However, rapeseed is a slower-growing, cold-climate source with lesser carbon-binding potential than the oil palm, making emissions from cultivation and transport proportionally more severe.

In 2017, the share of palm oil in the feedstock has been reduced to less than 20%, being replaced by reclaimed waste oils such as used frying oil, animal and fish fat, and camelina, jatropha, soy and rapeseed oil. Use of reclaimed waste oil reduces the greenhouse gas impact by 88–91%. Neste is continuing to look into new feedstock, including algae, jatropha and microbial oil.

== Use ==
This diesel is blended with petrodiesel. A market is created because the European Union required 5.75% of transport fuels should be biofuels by 2010. The EU further decided on 18 December 2008, that by 2020, the share of energy from renewable sources in all forms of transportation be at least 10% of the final consumption of energy. Systems and regions without an electrical grid will be the long-term market for hydrotreated vegetable oils, as the EU prefers electrical use by factor 2.5. In the Helsinki area, the Helsinki Metropolitan Area Council and the Helsinki City Transport conducted a three-year experiment by running buses with 25% Neste Renewable Diesel at first, and then switching to 100% in 2008. The trial, which was the largest field test of a biofuel produced from renewable raw materials worldwide, was a success: local emissions were decreased significantly, with particle emissions decreased by 30% and nitrogen oxide emissions by 10%, with excellent winter performance and no problems with catalytic converters. Since then, Helsinki buses have run on Neste Renewable Diesel.

As a result of its hydrocarbon nature, Neste Renewable Diesel operates without problems in current diesel vehicles in all climatic conditions. It does not have any of the drawbacks of the traditional ester type FAME biodiesel, such as cold operability, 'best before' date, engine and fuel system deposit formation, risk for microbial growth and water pick up, engine oil dilution and deterioration.

Neste Renewable Diesel can be blended into diesel fuel in any ratio, whereas the use of the traditional FAME biodiesel is limited to maximum 7% by the EN 590 standard in order to avoid technical problems in engines and vehicles.

Following a proposal by VDA, Daimler Trucks and Daimler Buses recommend the biofuel Neste Renewable Diesel as an admixture to petrodiesel.

== See also ==
- Biomass to liquid (BtL)
