= SCO =

SCO or sco may refer to:

== Businesses and organizations ==
- Santa Cruz Operation, a company founded in 1979 that existed under that name until 2001
- SCO Group, a software company formerly called Caldera International and Caldera Systems
  - SCO OpenServer (formerly SCO Unix), an operating system made by the above companies
- Shanghai Cooperation Organisation, a Eurasian inter-governmental political, economic, and security organization
- Society of Canadian Ornithologists
- Southern College of Optometry in Memphis, Tennessee
- Special Communications Organization, a Pakistani telecommunication company
- The ICAO airline code for Scoot

== Orchestras ==
- Scottish Chamber Orchestra
- Singapore Chinese Orchestra
- Swedish Chamber Orchestra

== Science and technology ==
- Scorpius, abbreviation for the constellation
- Self-checkout machines, automated alternatives to traditional cashier-staffed checkout at retailers
- Single cell oil, a type of oil produced by a microbe
- Subcommissural organ, a small glandular structure in the brain
- Synchronous Connection Oriented protocol, used for audio devices in the Bluetooth protocol stack
- Synthetic crude oil, a type of crude oil

== Other uses ==
- .sco, a formerly proposed top-level domain for Scotland
- Aktau Airport in Kazakhstan (IATA code SCO)
- Angers SCO, a French football club
- Scots language (ISO 639-2 & -3 alpha-3 code: sco)
- Selected Characteristics of Occupations, a companion volume to the U.S. Department of Labor's Dictionary of Occupational Titles
- Single Cell Orchestra, stage name of musician Miguel Fierro
- Sports teams representing Scotland, by country code
- Railway service code for South Coast Line, New South Wales, Australia
- Syllabus, or Standard Course Outline
- United States Office of Special Counsel (disambiguation), various government offices referred to as the "Special Counsel's Office"
