= Neste =

Finnish oil company

Neste Oyj

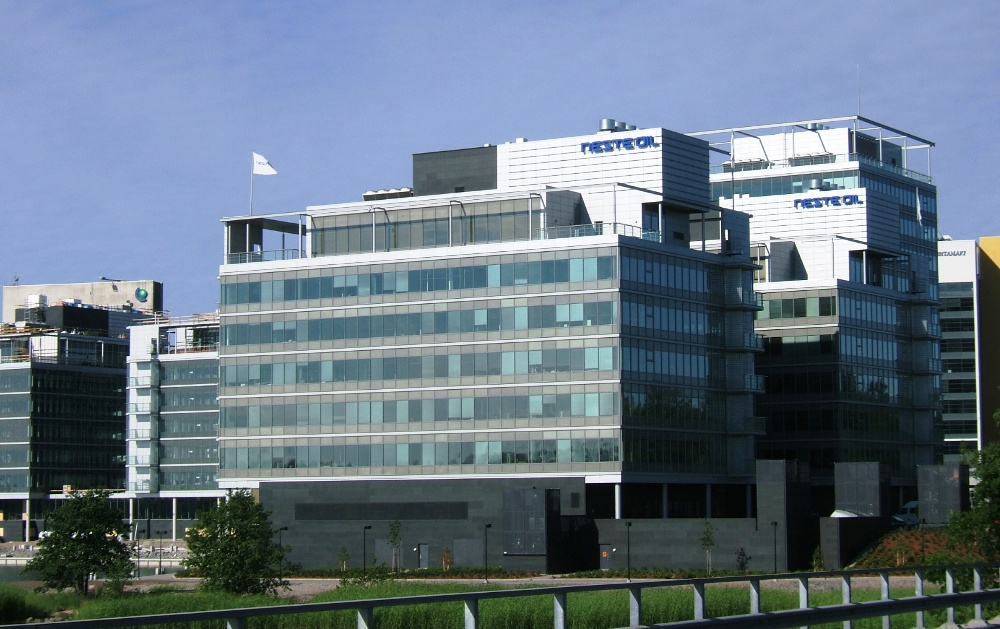
- Neste headquarters in Espoo
- Type: Julkinen osakeyhtiö
- Traded as: Nasdaq Helsinki: NESTE
- Industry: Oil and gas industry
- Founded: 1948; 78 years ago
- Headquarters: Espoo, Finland
- Key people: Heikki Malinen (President and CEO); Matti Kähkönen (Chairman of the Board)
- Products: Refined oil products, renewable fuels
- Revenue: ▲€15.148 billion (2021)
- Operating income: ▲€2.023 billion (2021)
- Net income: ▲€1.774 billion (2021)
- Total assets: ▲€12.417 billion (2021)
- Total equity: ▲€6.985 billion (2021)
- Number of employees: 4,872 (2021)
- Website: www.neste.com

Neste Oyj (international name: Neste Corporation; former names Neste Oil Corporation and Fortum Oil and Gas Oy; Finnish pronunciation: [ˈneste]) is an oil refining and marketing company located in Espoo, Finland. It produces, refines and markets oil products, provides engineering services, and licenses production technologies. Neste has operations in 14 countries.

Neste shares are listed on the Nasdaq Helsinki. As of 2022, the Prime Minister's Office of Finland is the largest shareholder in the company, owning 35.91% of shares. In 2021, Neste was the third largest company in Finland in terms of revenue. The name "Neste" means "liquid" in Finnish.

== History ==
=== 1948–1997 (Neste) ===
Neste was founded in 1948 as the state petrol company of Finland with the purpose to ensure the availability of refined fuels in Finland. The company's headquarters was established in Espoo.

In 1955, Uolevi Raade became the company's CEO. In 1957, the first oil refinery in Finland was built at Naantali using US technology. The Porvoo refinery was built in 1965 in Sköldvik (Kilpilahti). Originally, much of the oil refined was of Soviet origin, though North Sea oil was used after the collapse of the USSR.

In 1971, Neste acquired half of Kesko-owned Kesoil. Because of the operations of Neste, the oil crisis of 1973 had little effect in Finland. In 1976, Finland's first skyscraper, Neste's 83.6-meter tall headquarters, was built in Keilaniemi, Espoo. In 1980, Jaakko Ihamuotila became the CEO.

When Finland became the Soviet Union's largest Western oil importer in 1983, executive vice president Kai Hietarinta explained by stating that "the Soviets are reliable suppliers", in light of the 1970s energy crisis. From 1980 to 1982, Soviet supply increased from 58 to 81 percent of Finnish oil imports. Hietarinta noted that importing oil was Finland's only means to reduce its trade surplus. Trade obligations to the Soviet Union originated with the terms of its Independence from Russia in 1917, and the Second World War reparations from the 1944 Moscow Armistice that ended the Second Soviet–Finnish War.

Neste started its service station operations in 1983. Neste held a legal import monopoly until the market liberalization in the 1990s. In 1991, Neste became the majority owner of Finnoil. Kesoil also became a wholly owned subsidiary. In 1992, Union service stations became Neste service stations. The following year the same happened to Finnoil service stations. In 1994, Gasum was established with Gazprom as a minor (25%) shareholder. In 1994, Neste's polyolefin production was separated into Borealis, a joint venture with the Norwegian Statoil. In 1998, Neste's 50% stake in Borealis was sold to OMV and IPIC. In 1994, Neste began as the main sponsor of a competition previously known as the Finnish Rally and renamed Neste Rally Finland. In October 2020, Neste ended its 26-year title sponsorship. In November 1995, the company was listed on the main list of the Helsinki Stock Exchange.

=== 1998–2005 (Neste as part of Fortum) ===
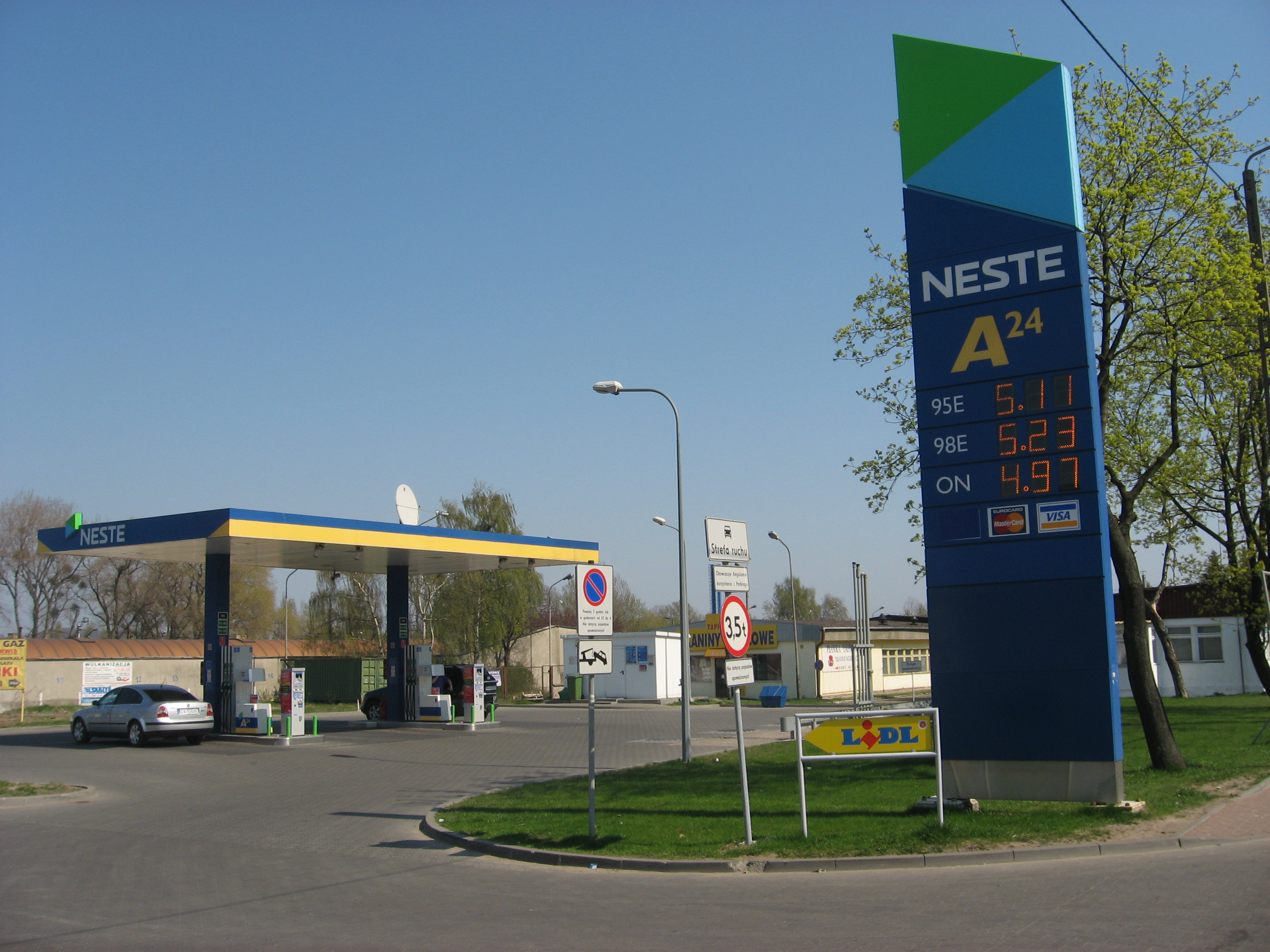
Neste station in Poland with its former look

In 1998, Neste merged with the power company Imatran Voima Oy to create Fortum Oyj. After the merger the chemical operations of Neste were transferred to the newly established company Neste Chemicals, which was sold to the investment firm Industri Kapital for $535 million. In 1998, Kesoil service stations also became Neste stations.

An engineering joint venture, Neste Jacobs Oy, was established with the American Jacobs Engineering in 2004. In May 2004, Fortum Oil and Gas Corporation was split into two: the company's oil business was renamed Fortum Oil Corporation and other operations renamed Fortum Heat and Gas Corporation. Fortum Oil Corporation was a subsidiary of Fortum Corporation.

=== 2005–2014 (Neste Oil) ===
Neste's logo until 1 April 2015

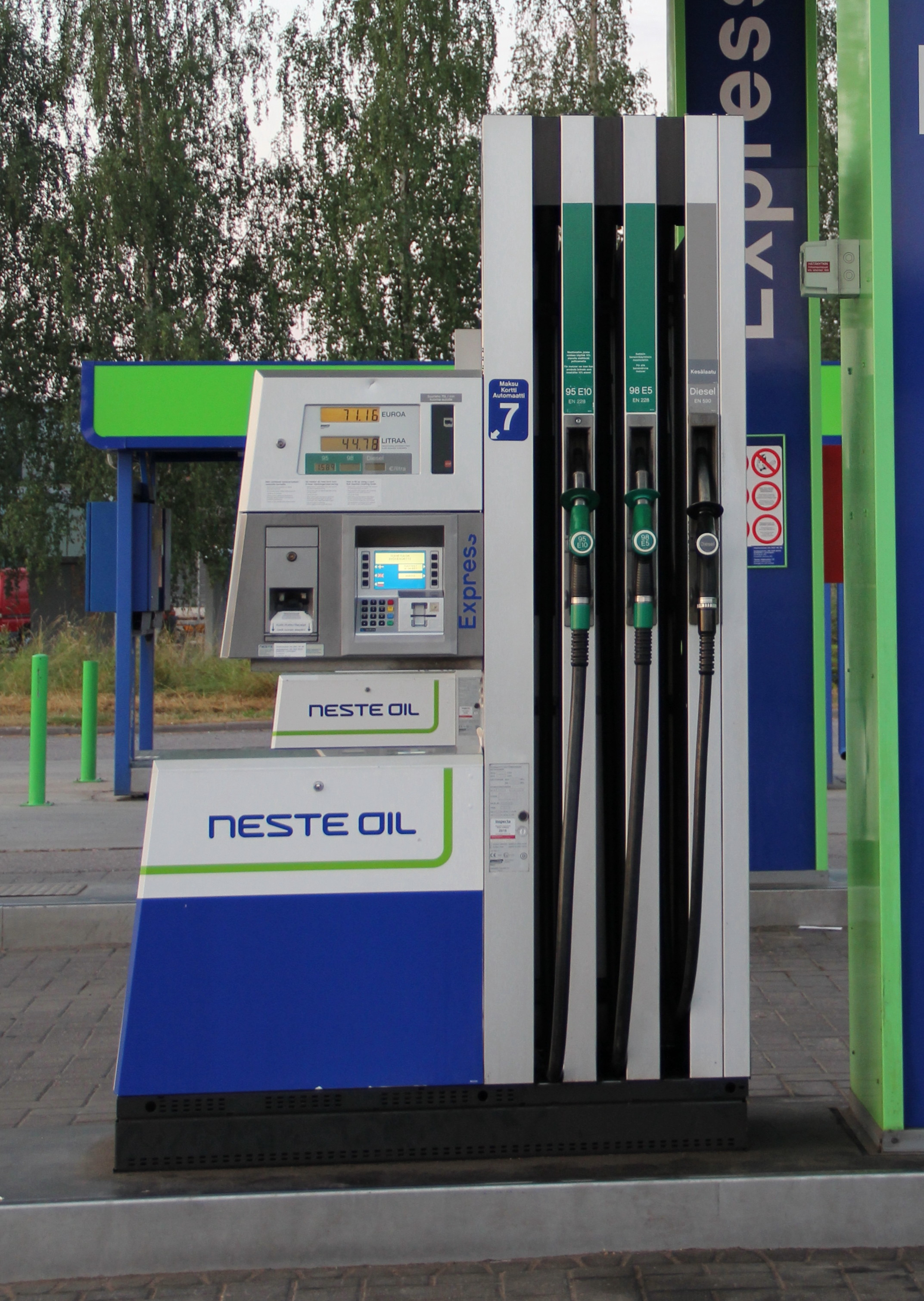
Neste Oil gas pump

In the spring of 2005, Fortum Oil Corporation was demerged from Fortum, becoming the Neste Oil Corporation. Neste Oil Corporation was listed on the Helsinki Stock Exchange in June 2005. Risto Rinne started as Ihamuotila's successor and CEO.

A renewable diesel plant, using second generation biofuels and NEXBTL technology and located at the Porvoo refinery, was brought on stream in 2007, together with a new conventional diesel production line. In the same year, the entire bus fleet of Helsinki Region Transport switched fully to diesel produced using NEXBTL technology. Experiments by Neste, VTT Technical Research Centre of Finland and Proventia showed that local emissions decreased significantly after the switch, with overall particle emissions decreasing by 30% and nitrogen oxide emissions by 10%, with excellent winter performance and no problems with catalytic converters. A second renewable diesel plant at Porvoo became operational in 2009.

In 2007, Neste started a research program on algae, but this was discontinued in 2015. In 2019, the research program restarted to investigate the production of aviation fuel from algae and municipal solid waste. In 2008, Rinne retired, with Matti Lievonen succeeding him as CEO. In 2011, a plant similar in size to the Singapore plant was launched in Rotterdam, Netherlands. Its investment costs amounted to 670 million euros.

Neste and Stora Enso ran a joint venture to research the production of renewable diesel oil from wood biomass through biomass gasification and the Fischer-Tropsch process in Varkaus, Finland. However, coming second in a bid for European Investment Bank startup funding led to the cancellation of this project in 2012. Neste's self-service station chain in Poland was sold to Royal Dutch Shell in April 2013.

=== 2015–2019 (Neste) ===
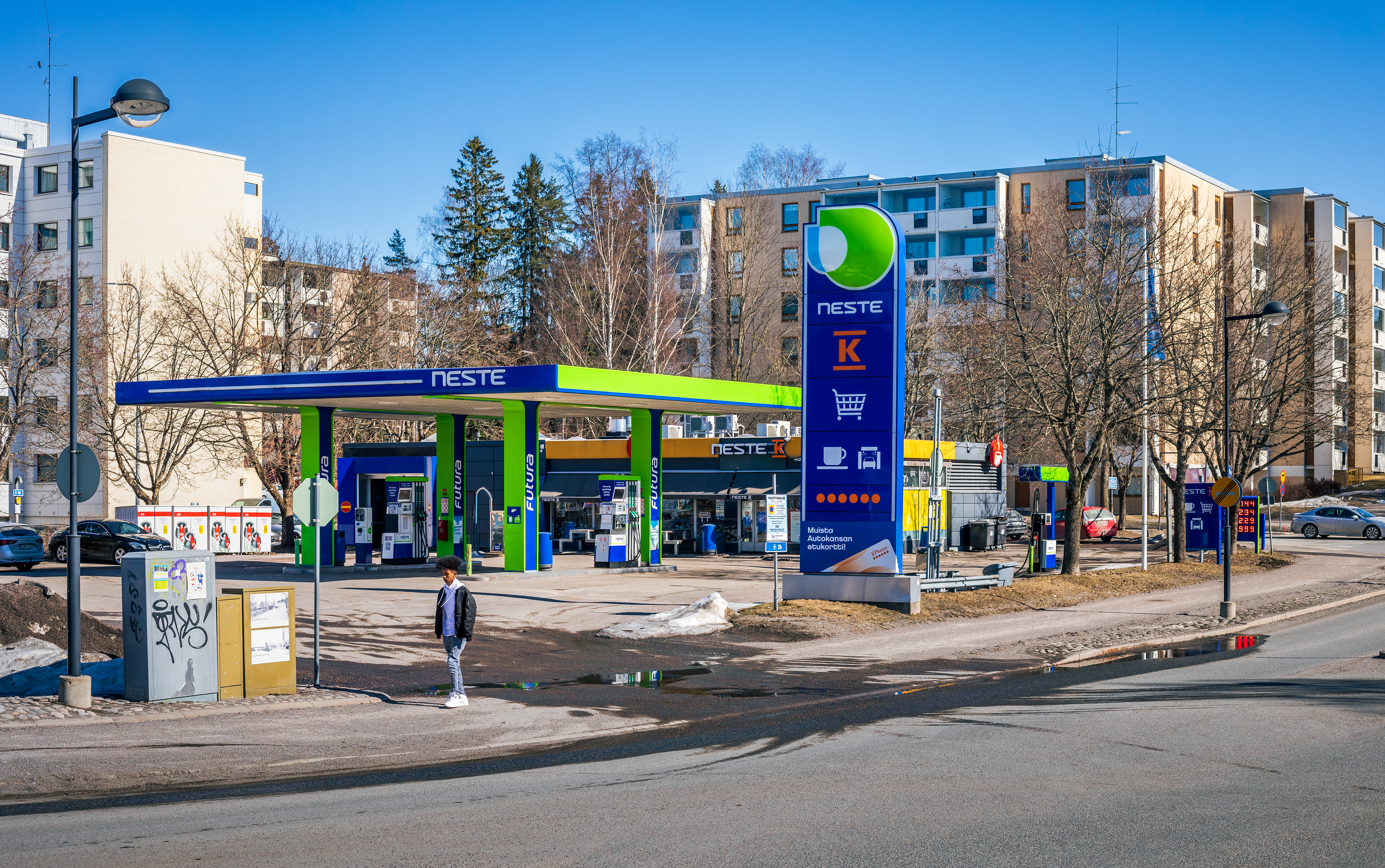
Neste K petrol station

In 2015, the company's name was changed from Neste Oil back to Neste to emphasize the company's focus on the renewable energy business.

In 2017, Neste acquired Jacobs Engineering's 40% stake in Neste Jacobs and gained full control of the company. After the takeover, Neste Jacobs was renamed Neste Engineering Solutions Oy.

When CEO Lievonen retired in November 2018, he was followed by the Belgian-German Peter Vanacker. In June, Neste and LyondellBasell announced the commercial-scale production of bio-based plastic from renewable materials.

=== 2020– (Neste) ===
In March 2020, Neste invested in German Sunfire, a company developing high-temperature electrolysis technology. In September, Neste sold its 49.99% stake in Nynas to Bitumina Industries, and began closure-related negotiations for the Naantali refinery. The refinery was planned to close by the end of March 2021. As part of the cooperation, Neste produces hydrocarbons from renewable raw materials as a feedstock to manufacture phenol by Borealis. Phenol is used by Covestro to produce polycarbonate plastics, which would primarily be used for car headlights and window coatings.

In December 2021, CEO Vanacker resigned to become the CEO of LyondellBasell. Matti Lehmus became CEO in May 2022.

== Operations ==
Neste's operations are divided into marketing and services, oil products, renewable aviation, renewable polymers and chemicals, and renewable road transportation units, as well as managing an operating platform.

=== Refining ===
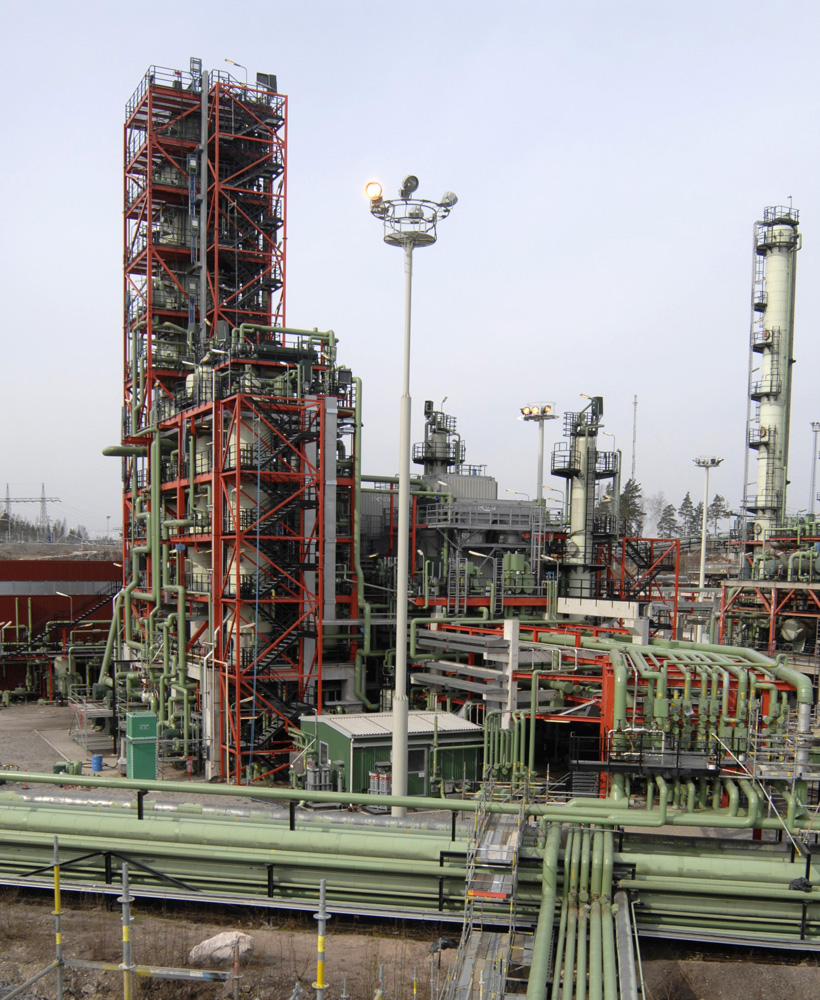
Neste's Porvoo refinery

In 2022, Neste operated conventional oil refineries at Porvoo in Finland and renewable diesel refineries in Porvoo, Singapore and Rotterdam, Netherlands.

In 2015, two renewable diesel production lines in Porvoo produced 0.525 million metric tonnes of renewable diesel, which was approximately one fifth of the diesel consumption of Finland. Neste's production facility in Singapore is the largest renewable diesel refinery in the world, with an annual capacity of 1.1 million metric tonnes. A planned new production line is expected to increase its capacity by one million tonnes in 2022.

Neste's refinery feedstock includes of crude oil and renewable raw materials, such as used cooking fat, waste animal and fish fat from the food industry, waste and residues from vegetable oil production, technical corn oil, palm oil, rapeseed oil, and soybean oil. About 80% of renewable feedstock is waste and residue fats and oils. Neste also researches the use of community waste, algae, lignocellulose, and liquefied waste plastic as feedstock. In 2019, most of the crude oil used by Neste came from Russia.

Neste produces gasolines, diesel, aviation and marine fuels, light and heavy fuel oils, base oils, gasoline components, special fuels and solvents. LPGs, carbon dioxide, and sulfur are sold as by-products. Neste's products include dozens of types of gasoline and more than a hundred end-products. In 2017, Neste was the world's largest producer of renewable diesel, producing 2.6 million tonnes per year.

Neste has developed the proprietary NEXBTL technology for the production of renewable fuels. Renewable diesel is a hydrodeoxygenated paraffinic fuel, which can be used in conventional diesel engines without engine modifications.

==== Aviation biofuel ====
Neste's sustainable aviation fuel (SAF) is a drop-in fuel, which can be mixed with kerosene to produce a mixture that contains at least 50% kerosene. Among others, it is used by Lufthansa and the Swedish Air BP. In 2019, Neste produced about 100,000 tonnes of sustainable aviation fuel and plans to produce around 1.5 million tonnes per year by 2023.

=== Service stations ===
Neste owns a chain of service stations, which is the largest in Finland. In 2020, Neste had station chains consisting of more than 800 traffic and automatic stations in Finland, Estonia, Latvia and Lithuania.

== Corporate issues ==
=== Shareholding ===
As of 31 May 2022, the five largest shareholders of Neste were:

- Prime Minister's Office (35.91%)
- Finnish Climate Fund (Ilmastorahasto Oy) (8.31%)
- Varma Mutual Pension Insurance Company (1.34%)
- Ilmarinen Mutual Pension Insurance Company (1.28%)
- Kela, the Social Insurance Institution of Finland (1.03%)

=== Recognition ===
- Neste was ranked Finland's most respected service station brand in a survey of Finnish brands carried out by Taloustutkimus and Markkinointi & Mainonta in Summer 2013.
- In February 2014, Talouselämä magazine named Neste's NEXBTL renewable diesel as the most groundbreaking Finnish business innovation of the new millennium.
- Neste was ranked the second most sustainable company in the world on the 2018 Global 100 index ranking by Corporate Knights, a financial information company.

== Environmental record ==
=== Climate record ===
Neste has a target to make its production carbon neutral by 2035.

=== Palm oil ===
Neste has been criticized for using palm oil and palm fatty acid distillate, a by‐product of physical refining of crude palm oil products, as a part of its feedstock for renewable products. Critics include of WWF, Greenpeace, Biofuelwatch and Milieudefensie, among others.

Neste consumes 1–2% of the world's total palm oil production. In 2016, less than 20% of renewable raw materials used by Neste was crude palm oil. Crude palm oil used by the company has been traceable to the oil palm plantation level since 2007, and has been 100% certified since 2013. However, certification does not apply to palm fatty acid distillate. Since 2016, Neste has published information about all its crude palm oil suppliers on its website.

In 2018, Biofuelwatch stated in their annual report that Neste meets EU sustainability standards for biofuels by sourcing palm oil from older plantations, commonly ones for which rainforest was destroyed before 2008. However, it cannot guarantee that all of its crude palm oil is free of effects from more recent or ongoing deforestation. Greenpeace has issued similar concerns about Neste's palm oil usage after an investigation by MapHubs showed that Neste's supply chain for palm oil includes Indonesian palm mills creating the most orangutan habitat loss.

Neste has been a target of sustained attacks, including publicity campaigns. In January 2011, Neste won the Public Eye Awards. Neste also attempted to shut down a parody website launched by Greenpeace; however, the World Intellectual Property Organization rejected the trademark-based complaint, since the page is noncommercial, gives no economical benefit, is not misleading, and follows the guidelines of freedom of speech.

=== Used cooking oil ===
In November 2022, it was announced Neste had acquired the used cooking oil (UCO) collection and aggregation business and related assets in the US from Crimson Renewable Energy Holdings, LLC. The transaction includes shares in SeQuential Environmental Services LLC, and Pure LLC, as well as a UCO processing plant in Salem, Oregon.

== See also ==
- Energy in Finland
- List of petroleum companies
- Social and environmental impact of palm oil
