= Pyrolysis oil (disambiguation) =

Pyrolysis oil may refer to:

- Pyrolysis oil - synthetic liquid fuel (bio-oil) produced by biomass pyrolysis
- Shale oil - synthetic liquid fuel produced by oil shale processing
- Synthetic fuel - any synthetic fuel produced by pyrolysis
- Coal oil - specific oil shale oil used for illuminating purposes
- Biomass to liquid - producing synthetic hydrocarbon fuels from biomass via a thermochemical route
