= Microbial genetics =

Subfield of genetics devoted to the study of microorganisms

Microbial genetics is a subject area within microbiology and genetic engineering. Microbial genetics studies microorganisms for different purposes. The microorganisms that are observed are bacteria and archaea. Some fungi and protozoa are also subjects used to study in this field. The studies of microorganisms involve studies of genotype and expression system. Genotypes are the inherited compositions of an organism. (Austin, "Genotype," n.d.) Genetic Engineering is a field of work and study within microbial genetics. The usage of recombinant DNA technology is a process of this work. The process involves creating recombinant DNA molecules through manipulating a DNA sequence. That DNA created is then in contact with a host organism. Cloning is also an example of genetic engineering.

== Role in understanding evolution ==
Microbial genetics can focus on Charles Darwin's work and scientists have continued to study his work and theories by the use of microbes. Specifically, Darwin's theory of natural selection is a source used. Studying evolution by using microbial genetics involves scientists looking at evolutionary balance. An example of how they may accomplish this is studying natural selection or drift of microbes. Application of this knowledge comes from looking for the presence or absence in a variety of different ways. The ways include identifying certain pathways, genes, and functions. Once the subject is observed, scientist may compare it to a sequence of a conserved gene. The process of studying microbial evolution in this way lacks the ability to give a time scale of when the evolution took place. However, by testing evolution in this way, scientist can learn the rates and outcomes of evolution. Studying the relationship between microbes and the environment is a key component to microbial genetics evolution.

== Microorganisms whose study is encompassed by microbial genetics ==
=== Bacteria ===
Bacteria are classified by their shape.

Bacteria have been on this planet for approximately 3.5 billion years, and are classified by their shape. Bacterial genetics studies the mechanisms of their heritable information, their chromosomes, plasmids, transposons, and phages.

Gene transfer systems that have been extensively studied in bacteria include genetic transformation, conjugation and transduction. Natural transformation is a bacterial adaptation for DNA transfer between two cells through the intervening medium. The uptake of donor DNA and its recombinational incorporation into the recipient chromosome depends on the expression of numerous bacterial genes whose products direct this process. In general, transformation is a complex, energy-requiring developmental process that appears to be an adaptation for repairing DNA damage.

Bacterial conjugation is the transfer of genetic material between bacterial cells by direct cell-to-cell contact or by a bridge-like connection between two cells. Bacterial conjugation has been extensively studied in Escherichia coli, but also occurs in other bacteria such as Mycobacterium smegmatis. Conjugation requires stable and extended contact between a donor and a recipient strain, is DNase resistant, and the transferred DNA is incorporated into the recipient chromosome by homologous recombination. E. coli conjugation is mediated by expression of plasmid genes, whereas mycobacterial conjugation is mediated by genes on the bacterial chromosome.

Transduction is the process by which foreign DNA is introduced into a cell by a virus or viral vector. Transduction is a common tool used by molecular biologists to stably introduce a foreign gene into a host cell's genome.

=== Archaea ===
Archaea is a domain of organisms that are prokaryotic, single-celled, and are thought to have developed 4 billion years ago. "They have no cell nucleus or any other organelles inside their cells."Archaea replicate asexually in a process known as binary fission. The cell division cycle includes when chromosomes of daughter cells replicate. Because archea have a singular structure chromosome, the two daughter cells separate and cell divides. Archaea have motility include with flagella, which is a tail like structure. Archaeal chromosomes replicate from different origins of replication, producing two haploid daughter cells. " They share a common ancestor with bacteria, but are more closely related to eukaryotes in comparison to bacteria. Some Archaea are able to survive extreme environments, which leads to many applications in the field of genetics. One of such applications is the use of archaeal enzymes, which would be better able to survive harsh conditions in vitro.

Gene transfer and genetic exchange have been studied in the halophilic archaeon Halobacterium volcanii and the hyperthermophilic archaeons Sulfolobus solfataricus and Sulfolobus acidocaldarius. H. volcani forms cytoplasmic bridges between cells that appear to be used for transfer of DNA from one cell to another in either direction. When S. solfataricus and S. acidocaldarius are exposed to DNA damaging agents, species-specific cellular aggregation is induced. Cellular aggregation mediates chromosomal marker exchange and genetic recombination with high frequency. Cellular aggregation is thought to enhance species specific DNA transfer between Sulfolobus cells in order to provide increased repair of damaged DNA by means of homologous recombination. Archaea are divided into 3 subgroups which are halophiles, methanogens, and thermoacidophiles. The first group, methanogens, are archaeabacteria that live in swamps and marshes as well as in the gut of humans. They also play a major role in decay and decomposition with dead organisms. Methanogens are anaerobic organisms, which are killed when they are exposed to oxygen. The second subgroup of archaeabacteria, halophiles are organisms that are present in areas with high salt concentration like the Great Salt Lake and the Dead Sea. The third subgroup thermoacidophiles also called thermophiles, are organisms that live in acidic areas. They are present in area with low pH levels like hot springs and geyers. Most thermophiles are found in the Yellowstone National Park.

Archaeal Genetics is the study of genes that consist of single nucleus-free cells. Archaea have a single, circular chromosomes that contain multiple origins of replication for initiation of DNA synthesis. DNA replication of Archaea involves similar processes including initiation, elongation, and termination. The primase used to synthesize a RNA primer varies than in eukaryotes. The primase by archaea is highly derived version of RNA recognition motif(RRM). Archaea come from Gram positive bacteria, which both have a single lipid bilayer, which are resistant to antibiotics. Archaea are similar to mitochondria in eukaryotes in that they release energy as adenosine triphosphate (ATP) through the chemical reaction called metabolism. Some archaea known as phototrophic archaea use the sun's energy to produce ATP. ATP synthase is used as photophosphorylation to convert chemicals into ATP.

Archaea and bacteria are structurally similar even though they are not closely related in the tree of life. The shapes of both bacteria and archaea cells vary from a spherical shape known as coccus or a rod-shape known as bacillus. They are also related with no internal membrane and a cell wall that assists the cell maintaining its shape. Even though archaeal cells have cells walls, they do not contain peptidoglycan, which means archaea do not produce cellulose or chitin. Archaea are most closely related to eukaryotes due to tRNA present in archaea, but not in bacteria. Archaea have the same ribosomes as eukaryotes that synthesize into proteins. Aside from the morphology of archaea and bacteria, there are other differences between these domains. Archaea that live in extreme and harsh environments with low pH levels such as salt lakes, oceans, and in the gut of ruminants and humans are also known as extremophiles. In contrast, bacteria are found in various areas such as plants, animals, soil, and rocks.

=== Fungi ===
Fungi can be both multicellular and unicellular organisms, and are distinguished from other microbes by the way they obtain nutrients. Fungi secrete enzymes into their surroundings, to break down organic matter. Fungal genetics uses yeast, and filamentous fungi as model organisms for eukaryotic genetic research, including cell cycle regulation, chromatin structure and gene regulation.

Studies of the fungus Neurospora crassa have contributed substantially to understanding how genes work. N. crassa is a type of red bread mold of the phylum Ascomycota. It is used as a model organism because it is easy to grow and has a haploid life cycle that makes genetic analysis simple since recessive traits will show up in the offspring. Analysis of genetic recombination is facilitated by the ordered arrangement of the products of meiosis in ascospores. In its natural environment, N. crassa lives mainly in tropical and sub-tropical regions. It often can be found growing on dead plant matter after fires.

Neurospora was used by Edward Tatum and George Beadle in their experiments for which they won the Nobel Prize in Physiology or Medicine in 1958. The results of these experiments led directly to the one gene-one enzyme hypothesis that specific genes code for specific proteins. This concept proved to be the opening gun in what became molecular genetics and all the developments that have followed from that.

Saccharomyces cerevisiae is a yeast of the phylum Ascomycota. During vegetative growth that ordinarily occurs when nutrients are abundant, S. cerevisiae reproduces by mitosis as diploid cells. However, when starved, these cells undergo meiosis to form haploid spores. Mating occurs when haploid cells of opposite mating types MATa and MATα come into contact. Ruderfer et al. pointed out that, in nature, such contacts are frequent between closely related yeast cells for two reasons. The first is that cells of opposite mating type are present together in the same acus, the sac that contains the cells directly produced by a single meiosis, and these cells can mate with each other. The second reason is that haploid cells of one mating type, upon cell division, often produce cells of the opposite mating type. An analysis of the ancestry of natural S. cerevisiae strains concluded that outcrossing occurs very infrequently (only about once every 50,000 cell divisions). The relative rarity in nature of meiotic events that result from outcrossing suggests that the possible long-term benefits of outcrossing (e.g. generation of diversity) are unlikely to be sufficient for generally maintaining sex from one generation to the next. Rather, a short-term benefit, such as meiotic recombinational repair of DNA damages caused by stressful conditions (such as starvation) may be the key to the maintenance of sex in S. cerevisiae.

Candida albicans is a diploid fungus that grows both as a yeast and as a filament. C. albicans is the most common fungal pathogen in humans. It causes both debilitating mucosal infections and potentially life-threatening systemic infections. C. albicans has maintained an elaborate, but largely hidden, mating apparatus. Johnson suggested that mating strategies may allow C. albicans to survive in the hostile environment of a mammalian host.

Among the 250 known species of aspergilli, about 33% have an identified sexual state. Among those Aspergillus species that exhibit a sexual cycle the overwhelming majority in nature are homothallic (self-fertilizing). Selfing in the homothallic fungus Aspergillus nidulans involves activation of the same mating pathways characteristic of sex in outcrossing species, i.e. self-fertilization does not bypass required pathways for outcrossing sex but instead requires activation of these pathways within a single individual. Fusion of haploid nuclei occurs within reproductive structures termed cleistothecia, in which the diploid zygote undergoes meiotic divisions to yield haploid ascospores.

=== Protozoa ===
Protozoa are unicellular organisms, which have nuclei, and ultramicroscopic cellular bodies within their cytoplasm. One particular aspect of protozoa that are of interest to human geneticists are their flagella, which are very similar to human sperm flagella.

Studies of Paramecium have contributed to our understanding of the function of meiosis. Like all ciliates, Paramecium has a polyploid macronucleus, and one or more diploid micronuclei. The macronucleus controls non-reproductive cell functions, expressing the genes needed for daily functioning. The micronucleus is the generative, or germline nucleus, containing the genetic material that is passed along from one generation to the next.

In the asexual fission phase of growth, during which cell divisions occur by mitosis rather than meiosis, clonal aging occurs leading to a gradual loss of vitality. In some species, such as the well studied Paramecium tetraurelia, the asexual line of clonally aging paramecia loses vitality and expires after about 200 fissions if the cells fail to undergo meiosis followed by either autogamy (self-fertilization) or conjugation (outcrossing) (see aging in Paramecium). DNA damage increases dramatically during successive clonal cell divisions and is a likely cause of clonal aging in P. tetraurelia.

When clonally aged P. tetraurelia are stimulated to undergo meiosis in association with either autogamy or conjugation, the progeny are rejuvenated, and are able to have many more mitotic binary fission divisions. During either of these processes the micronuclei of the cell(s) undergo meiosis, the old macronucleus disintegrates and a new macronucleus is formed by replication of the micronuclear DNA that had recently undergone meiosis. There is apparently little, if any, DNA damage in the new macronucleus, suggesting that rejuvenation is associated with the repair of these damages in the micronucleus during meiosis.

=== Viruses ===
Viruses are capsid-encoding organisms composed of proteins and nucleic acids that can self-assemble after replication in a host cell using the host's replication machinery. There is a disagreement in science about whether viruses are living due to their lack of ribosomes. Comprehending the viral genome is important not only for studies in genetics but also for understanding their pathogenic properties.

Many types of virus are capable of genetic recombination. When two or more individual viruses of the same type infect a cell, their genomes may recombine with each other to produce recombinant virus progeny. Both DNA and RNA viruses can undergo recombination. When two or more viruses, each containing lethal genomic damage infect the same host cell, the virus genomes often can pair with each other and undergo homologous recombinational repair to produce viable progeny. This process is known as multiplicity reactivation. Enzymes employed in multiplicity reactivation are functionally homologous to enzymes employed in bacterial and eukaryotic recombinational repair. Multiplicity reactivation has been found to occur with pathogenic viruses including influenza virus, HIV-1, adenovirus simian virus 40, vaccinia virus, reovirus, poliovirus and herpes simplex virus as well as numerous Bacteriophages.

Any living organism can contract a virus by giving parasites the opportunity to grow. Parasites feed on the nutrients of another organism which allows the virus to thrive. Once the human body detects a virus, it then creates fighter cells that attack the parasite/virus; literally, causing a war within the body. A virus can affect any part of the body causing a wide range of illnesses such as the flu, the common cold, and sexually transmitted diseases. The flu is an airborne virus that travels through tiny droplets and is formally known as Influenza. Parasites travel through the air and attack the human respiratory system. People that are initially infected with this virus pass infection on by normal day to day activity such as talking and sneezing. When a person comes in contact with the virus, unlike the common cold, the flu virus affects people almost immediately. Symptoms of this virus are very similar to the common cold but much worse. Body aches, sore throat, headache, cold sweats, muscle aches and fatigue are among the many symptoms accompanied by the virus. A viral infection in the upper respiratory tract results in the common cold. With symptoms like sore throat, sneezing, small fever, and a cough, the common cold is usually harmless and tends to clear up within a week or so. The common cold is also a virus that is spread through the air but can also be passed through direct contact. This infection takes a few days to develop symptoms; it is a gradual process unlike the flu.

== Applications of microbial genetics ==
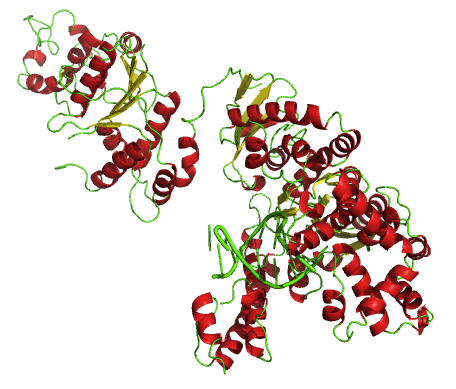
Taq polymerase which is used in Polymerase Chain Reaction(PCR)

Microbes are ideally suited for biochemical and genetics studies and have made huge contributions to these fields of science such as the demonstration that DNA is the genetic material, that the gene has a simple linear structure, that the genetic code is a triplet code, and that gene expression is regulated by specific genetic processes. Jacques Monod and François Jacob used Escherichia coli, a type of bacteria, in order to develop the operon model of gene expression, which lay down the basis of gene expression and regulation. Furthermore, the hereditary processes of single-celled eukaryotic microorganisms are similar to those in multi-cellular organisms allowing researchers to gather information on this process as well. Another bacterium which has greatly contributed to the field of genetics is Thermus aquaticus, which is a bacterium that tolerates high temperatures. From this microbe scientists isolated the enzyme Taq polymerase, which is now used in the powerful experimental technique, Polymerase chain reaction(PCR). Additionally the development of recombinant DNA technology through the use of bacteria has led to the birth of modern genetic engineering and biotechnology.

Using microbes, protocols were developed to insert genes into bacterial plasmids, taking advantage of their fast reproduction, to make biofactories for the gene of interest. Such genetically engineered bacteria can produce pharmaceuticals such as insulin, human growth hormone, interferons and blood clotting factors. These biofactories are typically much cheaper to operate and maintain than the alternative procedures of producing pharmaceuticals. They're like millions of tiny pharmaceutical machines that only require basic raw materials and the right environment to produce a large amount of product. The utilization of incorporating the human insulin gene alone has had profound impacts on the medical industry. It is thought that biofactories might be the ultimate key in reducing the price of expensive life saving pharmaceutical compounds.

Microbes synthesize a variety of enzymes for industrial applications, such as fermented foods, laboratory test reagents, dairy products (such as renin), and even in clothing (such as Trichoderma fungus whose enzyme is used to give jeans a stone washed appearance).

There is currently potential for microbes to be used as an alternative for petroleum-based surfactants. Microbial surfactants would still have the same kind of hydrophillic and hydrophobic functional groups as their petroleum-based counterparts, but they have numerous advantages over their competition. In comparison, microbial amphiphillic compounds have robust a tendency to stay functional in extreme environments such as areas with high heat or extreme ph. all while being biodegradable and less toxic to the environment. This efficient and cheap method of production could be the solution to the ever increasing global consumption of surfactants. Ironically, the application for bio-based surfactants with the most demand is the oil industry which uses surfactants in general production as well as development of specific oil compositions.

Microbes are an abundant source of lipases which have a wide variety of industrial and consumer applications. Enzymes perform a wide variety of functions inside the cells of living things, so it only makes sense that we can use them for similar purposes on a larger scale. Microbial enzymes are typically preferred for mass production due to the wide variety of functions available and their ability to be mass produced. Plant and animal enzymes are typically too expensive to be mass-produced, however this is not always the case. Especially in plants. Industrial applications of lipases generally include the enzyme as a more efficient and cost-effective catalyst in the production of commercially valuable chemicals from fats and oils, because they are able to retain their specific properties in mild easy to maintain conditions and work at an increased rate. Other already successful applications of lipolytic enzymes include the production of biofuels, polymers, non-stereoisomeric pharmaceuticals, agricultural compounds, and flavor-enhancing compounds.

In regards to industrial optimization, the benefit of the biofactory method of production is the ability to direct optimization by means of directed evolution. The efficiency and specificity of production will increase over time by imposing artificial selection. This method of improving efficiency is nothing new in agriculture, but it's a relatively new concept in industrial production. It is thought that this method will be far superior to conventional industrial methods because you have optimization on multiple fronts. The first front being that the microorganisms that make up biofactories can be evolved to our needs. The second front being the conventional method of optimization brought about by the integration of advancing technologies. This combination of conventional and biological advancement is just now becoming utilized and provides a virtually limitless number of applications.

== See also ==
- Bacterial genetics
