= Oleaginous microorganism =

Type of microbe that accumulates lipid as a normal part of its metabolism

An oleaginous microorganism is a type of microbe that accumulates lipid as a normal part of its metabolism. Oleaginous microbes may accumulate an array of different lipid compounds, including polyhydroxyalkanoates, triacylglycerols, and wax esters. Various microorganisms, including bacteria, fungi, and yeast, are known to accumulate lipids. These organisms are often researched for their potential use in producing fuels from waste products.

== Function ==
For a typical bacteria, polar lipids such as phospholipids are synthesized to maintain the cell membrane. However, in oleaginous organisms, lipids can be synthesized and accumulated within the cell to act as energy storage in nutrient deprived conditions. Lipid accumulation can also serve secondary purposes such as acting as a water source in water stressed conditions, and to prevent oxidative stress from the formation of reactive oxygen species as a result of ultraviolet radiation.

Lipid accumulation occurs as a storage of energy and nutrients, which appears to be triggered by inadequate environmental conditions. Bacteria such as Methylobacterium rhodesianum strain MB126 have been observed to accumulate poly-β-hydroxybutyrate when grown under phosphorus-, nitrogen-, and carbon-deficient conditions. Similarly, other organisms such as oleaginous Rhodococcus species like R. opacus are known to accumulate triacylglycerols instead, with the fatty acid content of these compounds varying by organism and environmental conditions. Lipid accumulation is proposed to be advantageous to oleaginous microbes as it provides a source of energy and nutrients when they are absent from the environment. It allows the organisms to survive through 'feast and famine' conditions, to prevent die offs before a new source of energy and nutrients may be provided to the population.

The specific conditions causing triacylglycerol synthesis and accumulation have been studied in order to develop processes where its intracellular content is maximized. The carbon to nitrogen ratio has been identified as being particularly important for the accumulation of lipids. Conditions with low nitrogen and excess carbon content have been observed to cause increased lipogenesis in bacteria in the genus Rhodococcus.

Lipid accumulation may also provide benefits to organisms in water stressed conditions. The metabolism of triacylglycerols and wax esters have the potential to produce 1.4 molecules of water for each molecule of lipid processed, while poly-β-hydroxybutyrate has a return of 0.5 molecules of water for each molecule of lipid metabolism. Another analysis determined that 107.1g of water can be harvested from 100g of microbial lipids, which is higher than the same amount of carbohydrate storage molecules. This means that oleaginous organisms can rely on lipid storage to reduce water stress and prevent desiccation in arid environments.

Another way that lipid accumulation supports oleaginous microbes survival is the tempering of oxidative stress caused by reactive oxygen species. In environments where ultraviolet radiation is intense, such as deserts or polar regions, microbes can be damaged by the formation of reactive oxygen species from water molecules that interact with the cell's DNA, cellular components, or metabolic processes. Osmolytes such as glycerol – a component of triacylglycerol – stabilize the intracellular water and prevent the formation of reactive oxygen species, preventing cell damage and lysis as a result of ultraviolet radiation.

The genetic component of triacylglycerol biosynthesis has been investigated. Its biosynthesis is catalyzed by the wax ester/acyl-CoA:diacylglycerol acyltransferase enzymes, which is associated with the atf genes, A study investigating the atf genes determines that out of the 10 atf genes identified in R. opacus PD630, only atf1 and aft2 had significant impacts on the activity of the enzymes and the resulting synthesis and accumulation of triacylglycerol.

== Source of biofuels ==
Oleaginous microbes have attracted attention for their potential as sources for biofuels such as biodiesel. Instead of using nonrenewable fuel sources such as petroleum and natural gas, biodiesel has the potential to produce fuel sources from other forms of waste such as agricultural waste or wastewater. Oleaginous microbes have the ability to degrade various different materials into polyhydroxyalkanoates, which may have the potential to form bioplastics, and triacylglycerols, which may have the potential to form biodiesel. Microbes can be integrated into existing processes or waste streams such as wastewater treatment to harvest resources from the waste. Currently, many biofuels are made using plant oils, but products such as single cell oil utilizing microbial lipids require less land and have shorter time constraints compared to the processing of plant oils. Considering both the use of waste as a substrate, the integration into established processes, and the low resource investment, using oleaginous microbes as a source of biofuel is attractive to many researchers.
