= Sodium methoxide =

Ionic organic compound (CH3ONa)

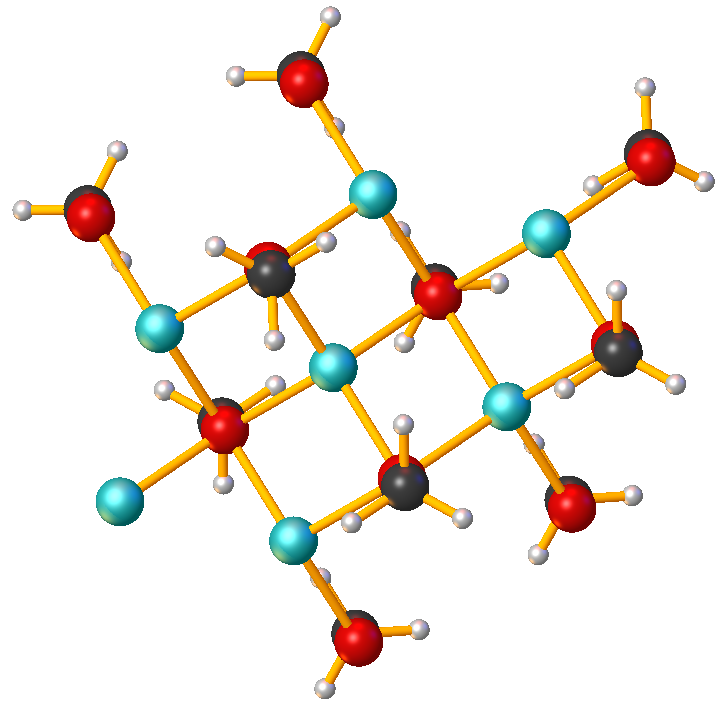

Names
- IUPAC name Sodium methoxide
- Other names Sodium methylate

Identifiers
| CAS Number | 124-41-4 |
| 3D model (JSmol) | Interactive image |
| Abbreviations | MeONa |
| ChemSpider | 29033 |
| ECHA InfoCard | 100.004.273 |
| PubChem CID | 10942334 |
| UNII | IG663U5EMC |
| CompTox Dashboard (EPA) | DTXSID8027030 |
- InChI: InChI=1S/CH3O.Na/c1-2;/h1H3;/q-1;+1 Key: WQDUMFSSJAZKTM-UHFFFAOYSA-N; InChI=1/CH3O.Na/c1-2;/h1H3;/q-1;+1 Key: WQDUMFSSJAZKTM-UHFFFAOYAC
- SMILES: [Na+].[O-]C

Properties
| Chemical formula | CH_{3}NaO |
| Molar mass | 54.024 g·mol^{−1} |
| Appearance | White solid |
| Melting point | 127 °C (261 °F; 400 K) |
| Boiling point | 350 °C (662 °F; 623 K) (decomposition) |
| Solubility in water | Reacts with water |
| Solubility | Soluble in ethanol, methanol Insoluble in hydrocarbons |

Structure
| Crystal structure | Hexagonal |

Hazards
- GHS labelling
| Pictograms | (GHS02: Flammable) (GHS05: Corrosive) (GHS07: Exclamation mark) |
| Signal word | Danger |
| Hazard statements | H251, H302, H314 |
| Precautionary statements | P235+P410, P280, P305+P351+P338, P310 |
| Safety data sheet (SDS) | Sigma |
- Except where otherwise noted, data are given for materials in their standard state (at 25 °C [77 °F], 100 kPa). verify (what is ?) Infobox references

Sodium methoxide is the simplest sodium alkoxide. With the formula CH_{3}ONa, it is a white solid, which is formed by the deprotonation of methanol. It is a widely used reagent in industry and the laboratory. It is also a dangerously caustic base.

== Preparation and structure ==
Sodium methoxide is prepared by treating methanol with sodium:

2 Na + 2 CH_{3}OH → 2 CH_{3}ONa + H_{2}

The reaction is so exothermic that ignition is possible. The resulting solution, which is colorless, is often used as a source of sodium methoxide, but the pure material can be isolated by evaporation followed by heating to remove residual methanol.

As a solid, sodium methoxide is polymeric, with sheet-like arrays of Na^{+} centers, each bonded to four oxygen centers.

The structure, and hence the basicity, of sodium methoxide in solution depends on the solvent. It is a significantly stronger base in DMSO where it is more fully ionized and free of hydrogen bonding.

== Applications ==
=== Organic synthesis ===
Sodium methoxide is a routinely used base in organic chemistry, applicable to the synthesis of numerous compounds ranging from pharmaceuticals to agrichemicals. As a base, it is employed in dehydrohalogenations and various condensations. It is also a nucleophile for the production of methyl ethers.

=== Industrial applications ===
Sodium methoxide is used as an initiator of anionic addition polymerization with ethylene oxide, forming a polyether with high molecular weight. Biodiesel is prepared from vegetable oils and animal fats (fatty acid triglycerides) by transesterification with methanol to give fatty acid methyl esters (FAMEs). Sodium methoxide acts as a catalyst for this reaction, but will combine with any free fatty acids present in the oil/fat feedstock to form soap byproducts.

== Stability ==
The solid hydrolyzes in water to give methanol and sodium hydroxide. Indeed, samples of sodium methoxide are often contaminated with sodium hydroxide, which is difficult to detect. The compound absorbs carbon dioxide from the air to form methanol and sodium carbonate, thus diminishing the alkalinity of the base.

CH_{3}ONa + CO_{2} + H_{2}O → 2 CH_{3}OH + Na_{2}CO_{3}

Commercial batches of sodium methoxide show variable levels of degradation, and were a major source of irreproducibility when used in Suzuki reactions.

== Safety ==
Sodium methoxide is highly caustic and reacts with water to give methanol, which is toxic and volatile.

=== NFPA 704 ===
The ratings for this substance vary widely.

| Rating | 3 4 3 | 3 4 2 | 3 3 2 | 3 2 2 | 2 2 2 |
| Source | State of Connecticut | DuPont | Pharmco AAPR | ScienceLab (Both ratings on same sheet) | |

== See also ==
- Methoxide
- Biodiesel production
- Sodium ethoxide
