= Biomass to liquid =

Synthesis of fuel from biomass

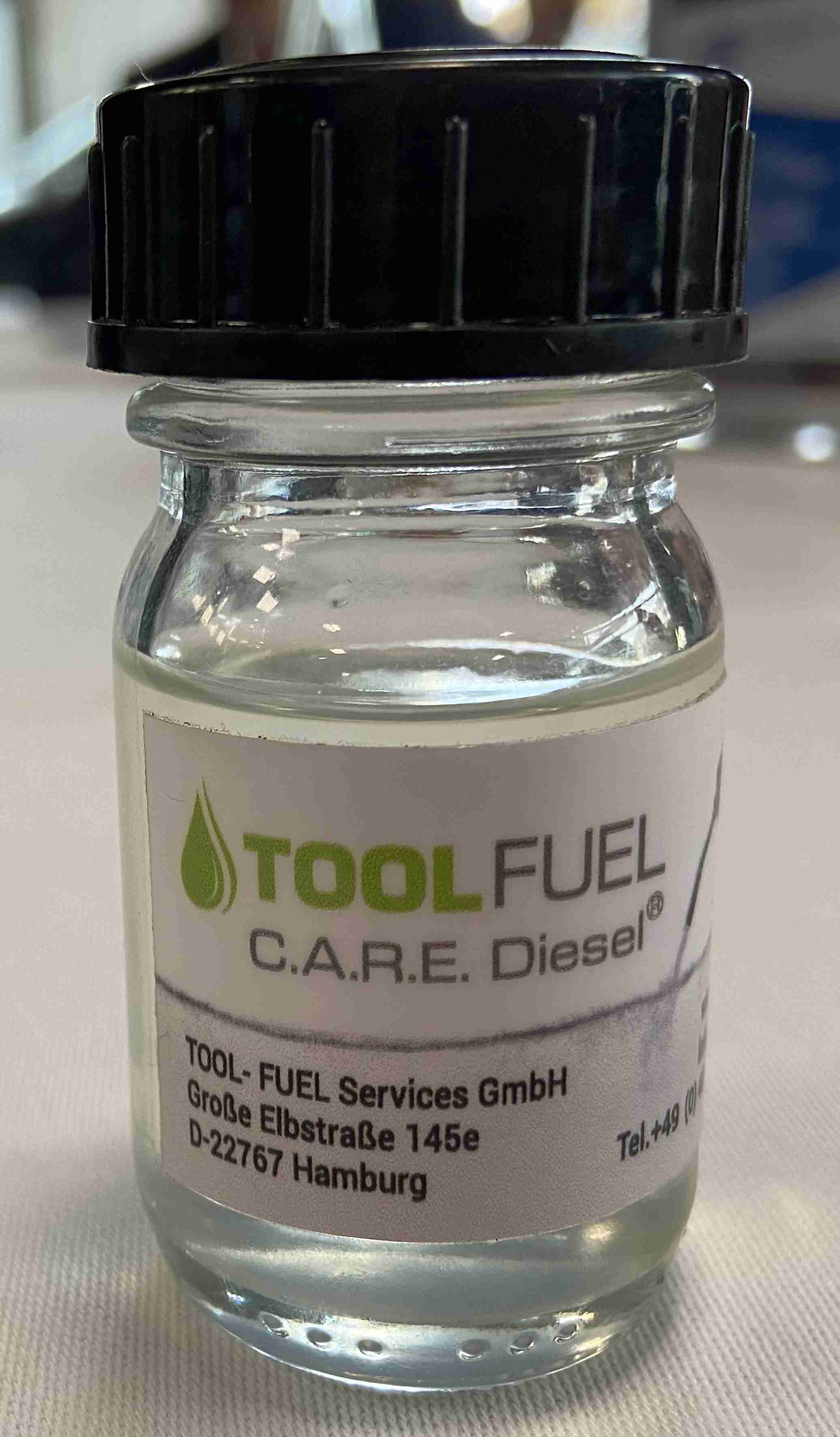
Btl Diesel

Biomass to liquid (BtL or BMtL) is a multi-step process of producing synthetic hydrocarbon fuels made from biomass via a thermochemical route.

== Main processes ==
According to a study done by the U.S. Department of Agriculture and the Department of Energy, the United States can produce at least 1.3 billion tons of cellulosic biomass each year without decreasing the amount of biomass needed for food, animal feed, or exports.

=== Fischer–Tropsch process ===
The Fischer–Tropsch process is used to produce synfuels from gasified biomass. Carbonaceous material is gasified and the gas is processed to make purified syngas (a mixture of carbon monoxide and hydrogen). The Fischer–Tropsch polymerizes syngas into diesel-range hydrocarbons. While biodiesel and bio-ethanol production so far only use parts of a plant, i.e. oil, sugar, starch or cellulose, BtL production can gasify and utilize the entire plant.

=== Flash pyrolysis ===
Flash pyrolysis—producing bio-oil (pyrolysis oil), char and gas at temperatures between 350 and 550 °C and residence times < 1 second (also called anhydrous pyrolysis).

=== Catalytic fast pyrolysis ===
Catalytic fast pyrolysis is a fast process in which the cellulose is broken down to a liquid biofuel. In this approach the cellulose is heated to 500 degrees Celsius in less than one second in a chamber to break apart the molecules. The catalyst forms chemical reactions that remove oxygen bonds and form carbon rings. After the reaction takes place gasoline is formed along with water, carbon dioxide, and carbon monoxide.

=== Pyrolysis and gasification ===
Initially biomass undergoes pyrolysis process to produce pyrolysis gases and biochar. The volatile organic compounds in pyrolysis gases further undergo gasification process to produce syngas rich in hydrogen and carbon monoxide gases which is further converted in to methanol (CH_{3}OH). The carbon neutral biochar is further converted in to ethylene or ethanol with hydrogen generated from renewable electricity or used for carbon sequestration to reduce global warming CO_{2} gas in the atmosphere.

== Potential energy grasses ==
Fuel from energy grasses may be referred to as grassoline.

=== Switchgrass ===
Switchgrass is a bunch grass native to North America that grows naturally in warm weather with wide adaptation capability and easy germination, allowing the switchgrass to grow faster; however, it has a low relative yield compared to other energy crops

=== Sorghum ===
Sorghum is cultivated in warmer climates, mostly in the tropical regions. Sorghum has the potential to be an energy grass because it requires little water and can give a large yield. Sorghum, however, is an annual plant, is difficult to establish in an area, and requires a large input of fertilizers and pesticides.

=== Miscanthus ===
Miscanthus species are native to the tropical regions of Africa and southern Asia. Miscanthus can grow up to 3.5 meters high and has been trialed as a biofuel since the 1980s. The benefits of using Miscanthus are that it can live more than two years and requires low inputs, eliminating the need for extra irrigation, fertilizer and pesticides. The problems with Miscanthus arise from the time it takes to establish to an area.

=== Sugarcane ===
Sugarcane grows in irrigated lands of tropics and subtropics which can produce 15 kg biomass per square meter area. It is also suitable for BtL as its extracted juice is used to produce ethanol by traditional methods and also its remaining biomass (bagasse, leaves, shoots, etc.) can be converted in to carbon neutral ethanol or methanol by subjecting to pyrolysis and gasification. Biochar can also be produced for carbon sequestration to compensate the carbon emissions by fossil fuels or reduce CO_{2} gas concentration in the atmosphere.

=== Bamboo ===
Bamboo is one of the fastest growing plant/biomass which can be used as feed stock for BtL. Most bamboo species are native to warm and moist tropical and to warm temperate climates. However, many species are found in diverse climates, ranging from hot tropical regions to cool mountainous regions and highland cloud forests.

== Cost of change ==
Fuel costs depend on how fast the grasses grow and other factors. An estimated investment of over $325 billion (2008 basis) would be needed to build biofactories capable of producing the 65 billion gallons of biofuel needed to meet 2030 national goals.

== See also ==
- Bioconversion of biomass to mixed alcohol fuels
- Bioenergy
- Biofuel
- Bioliquids
- Biomass
- Biomass gasification
- Biomass heating systems
- Bioproduct
- Biorefinery
- DMF fuel
- Gas to liquid
- Cellulosic ethanol
- Coal to liquid
- Gasification
- NExBTL—despite the name BtL, the feedstock is plant oil, not whole plants.
- Non-food crops
- Renewable energy
- Sustainable energy
- Synthetic fuel
- Thermal depolymerization
- Wood fuel
