= Hydrogenolysis =

Chemical reaction in which a C–C or C–R bond is cleaved by hydrogen

Hydrogenolysis is a chemical reaction whereby a carbon–carbon or carbon–heteroatom single bond is cleaved or undergoes lysis (breakdown) by hydrogen. The heteroatom may vary, but it usually is oxygen, nitrogen, or sulfur. A related reaction is hydrogenation, where hydrogen is added to the molecule, without cleaving bonds. Usually hydrogenolysis is conducted catalytically using hydrogen gas.

== History ==
The term "hydrogenolysis" was coined by Carleton Ellis in reference to hydrogenolysis of carbon–carbon bonds. Earlier, Paul Sabatier had already observed the hydrogenolysis of benzyl alcohol to toluene, and as early as 1906, Padoa and Ponti had observed the hydrogenolysis of furfuryl alcohol. Homer Burton Adkins and Ralph Connor were the first to call the carbon–oxygen bond cleavage "hydrogenolysis".

== In the petrochemical industry ==
In petroleum refineries, catalytic hydrogenolysis of feedstocks is conducted on a large scale to remove sulfur from feedstocks, releasing gaseous hydrogen sulfide (H_{2}S). The hydrogen sulfide is subsequently recovered in an amine treater and finally converted to elemental sulfur in a Claus process unit. In those industries, desulfurization process units are often referred to as hydrodesulfurizers (HDS) or hydrotreaters (HDT). Catalysts are based on molybdenum sulfide containing smaller amounts of cobalt or nickel. Hydrogenolysis is accompanied by hydrogenation.

Another hydrogenolysis reaction of commercial importance is the hydrogenolysis of esters into alcohols by catalysts such as copper chromite.

The hydrodeoxygenation reaction used in the Neste Renewable Diesel process, the vegetable oil refining process of largest production capacity, is a hydrogenolysis of triglycerides into alkanes.

== In the laboratory ==
In the laboratory, hydrogenolysis is used in organic synthesis. Debenzylation is most common and involves the cleavage of benzyl ethers:

R^{−}OCH_{2}C_{6}H_{5} + H_{2} → R^{−}OH + CH_{3}C_{6}H_{5}

Thioketals undergo hydrogenolysis using Raney nickel in the Mozingo reduction.

Laboratory hydrogenolysis is operationally similar to hydrogenation, and may be accomplished at atmospheric pressure by stirring the reaction mixture under a slight positive pressure of hydrogen gas, having flushed the apparatus with more of this gas. The hydrogen may be provided by attaching a balloon to a needle, filling it from a bottle, and inserting the needle into the reaction flask via a rubber septum. At high pressure, a hydrogenation autoclave (i.e., a Buchi or Parr hydrogenator) or similar piece of equipment is required.
