= Endangerment of orangutans =

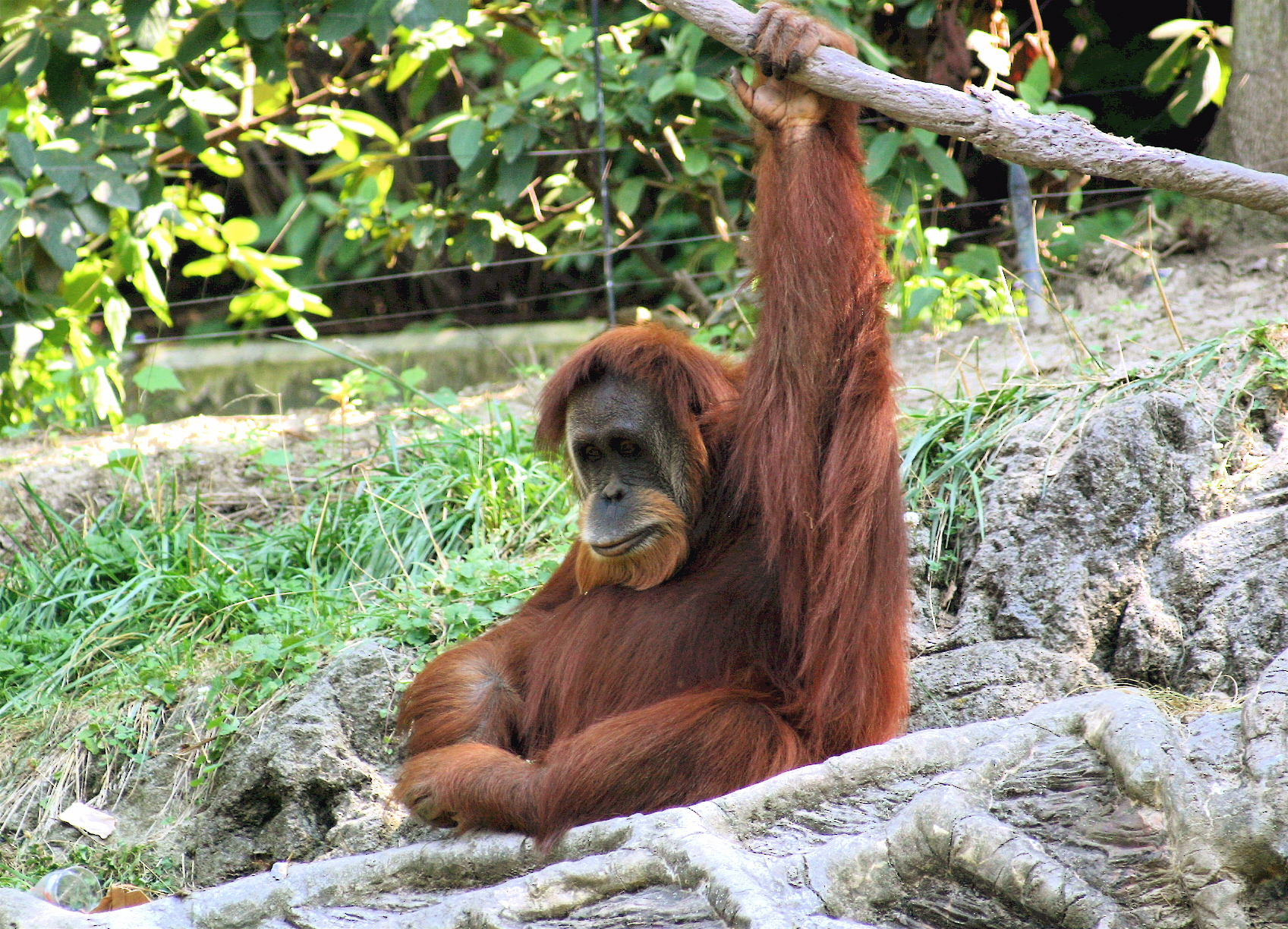
Sumatran orangutan (Pongo abelii)

There are three species of orangutan. The Bornean orangutan, the most common, can be found in Kalimantan, Indonesia and Sarawak and Sabah in Malaysia. The Sumatran orangutan and the Tapanuli orangutan are both only found in Sumatra, Indonesia. The conservation status of all three of these species is critically endangered, according to the International Union for Conservation of Nature (IUCN) Red List.

== Population decline ==
Since the 1950s, the population of all three species has been steeply declining. The current population of orangutans cannot be accurately calculated; however, in 2017 it was estimated that the number of individuals remaining was: 104,000 Bornean orangutans, 14,000 Sumatran orangutans, and 800 Tapanuli orangutans. The number of Bornean orangutans has decreased by more than 60% in 60 years, and the population of the Sumatran orangutan has decreased by 80% in the last 75 years. It is estimated that between 1999 and 2015, the population of Bornean orangutans decreased by over 100,000.

The primary reason for population decline is habitat loss as a result of the unsustainable practice of timber extraction for the production of palm oil in areas in which orangutans habituate, notably Indonesia and Malaysia. Orangutans cannot survive without forests as they are both a home and food source, they build nests in trees for sleeping and survive off tree fruits. Additionally, orangutans are killed by poaching, where often mothers are killed and infants are seized and sold on the black market as pets.

There are numerous conservation sites and not-for-profit organisations that have been created in an effort to prevent further decline of the orangutan population; however, in 2016, it was predicted by experts that unless drastic changes are made to the current deforestation laws, orangutans face extinction within the next ten years.

== Reasons for endangerment ==
=== Deforestation ===
Deforestation in Sumatra and Borneo is the primary reason for the endangerment of all species of orangutans. Timber is extracted from these areas for the production of palm oil, paper, and pulp. Majority of the logging is illegal, and with the rapid expansion of the palm oil industry, extraction rates have exponentially increased over the past 40 years. Deforestation is extremely harmful to orangutans because the forest is their habitat. As this deforestation continues, the orangutans will be exposed to humans more often. This is harmful because it leaves the orangutans vulnerable to poaching.

Logging first began occurring in the 1970s for the production of furniture and commercial products. During this time, Indonesian president Suharto introduced a transmigration program, where 18,000 poor transmigrants were sent to Kalimantan, Borneo, who turned to illegal logging to earn money. Additionally, President Suharto gave out large amounts of forests in order solidify political relationships.

When the production of palm oil was first introduced, the rate of deforestation grew significantly. Producers soon realised that by logging one hectare of the oil palm plant, over 5,000 kg of oil could be created, making the plant highly profitable to those who grew and extracted it. Today, palm oil makes up nearly 60% of the oils and fats trade and is the most consumed vegetable oil in the world. A large volume of palm oil is used in India and China for the use of cooking oil, and use is increasing in European countries for the production of biodiesel in response to the rise of climate change. In 1974/1975, the global crude palm oil output was less than 3 million tonnes, but due to a heavy escalation of demand for the product, this rate grew to 40 million tonnes in 2006/2007. This figure represents an annual growth rate of 8%. Indonesia and Malaysia account for 87% of palm oil output, with Indonesia producing 18.3 million tonnes and Malaysia producing 17.4 million tonnes in 2007/2008. The reason for the high rate of output from these countries is because it is highly cost-efficient; production costs and wages are very low compared to other countries. Additionally, the climate in this countries is ideal for growing the palm oil plant, making growth and production rates high.

By 1985, the annual rate of deforestation in Kalimantan, where majority of the orangutan population habituates, was 180,000 hectares. This rate of deforestation then further increased between the late 1980s and 2000, with the amount of land being logged annually increasing by 44% between 1997 and 2000 alone. In the 2000s, the rate decreased slightly; however, by 2007, the annual deforestation rate had reached 1.3 million hectares. In 2006, Indonesia overtook Malaysia as the world's largest palm oil exporter, having exported over 20.9 million tonnes of palm oil. By 2007, only 50% of the original forest cover remained in Borneo. It was expected that by 2020, this forest cover would be reduced to 24% if production rates continued. As orangutans cannot survive outside forest areas, the extremely high rate of deforestation has caused the population to decrease significantly, resulting in the conservation status of critically endangered.

Deforestation is also occurring as a result of fires that wipe out large amounts of land and subsequently orangutan populations. Fires are set on purpose by palm oil companies in peat swamp forests. As a result of these fires, orangutans in these habitats will often die amidst the fire. If they survive, they will either be left to starve without a habitat, or flee, leaving them without a habitat and at risk of capture from residents, who will either kill them for meat, keep them as pets or sell them on the black market to wealthier counties.

=== Poaching ===
The illegal poaching of orangutans is the second largest factor contributing towards population decline. Orangutans are viewed as easy targets, according to hunters, because of their typically large size and lack of speed. Sumatran, Tapanuli and Bornean orangutans are killed at a high rate for many reasons, the most common being the trade of meat or because farmers believe they are a threat to their crops. A survey conducted by experts in the field reported that orangutans were killed for both conflict and non-conflict related reasons. According to the survey, 56% of people who had reported to have previously killed an orangutan did so to eat it. Out of the reasons related to conflict, the most common was killing orangutans out of fear or in an act of self defense. This research article states that other reasons for the poaching of orangutans include being paid to kill, traditional medicine, being killed to take infants to sell on the black market, sport hunting, or being killed accidentally as the hunters had the intention of poaching other animals. A national geographic survey revealed that "between 750 and 1,790 Bornean orangutans are killed each year in Kalimantan", which largely outnumbers the annual birth rate. The poaching of orangutans is directly related to rates of deforestation. Those who grow and maintain palm oil plantations kill orangutans at a high rate if they habituate within their crops, therefore as deforestation rates rise, poaching rates subsequently grow. Orangutans often interfere with these crops, however, to look for food to eat since they often cannot find food in the forest.

Over the past few decades, the rate of orangutan poaching has increased significantly due to the discovery of more efficient weapons and methods of killing, such as the use of poisons, AK-47s and explosives. Poaching is predominantly conducted by plantation workers or villagers who consume and sell orangutan meat, many of which believe contains medicinal benefits.

=== Illegal pet trading ===
Behind the illegal drug trade, the trade of wildlife is the 2nd most profitable illegal trade in the world, with a combined annual value of 10 billion dollars. Orangutans are one of the most expensive animals in this trade. Often, the poaching of orangutans is linked with the illegal pet trading, where it is highly common for poachers to kill adult females, and take the infant to sell on the black market. According to a survey, hunters are paid approximately USD$80 to $200 for an infant orangutan. They are then often sent to Jakarta, Indonesia to be sold to wealthy Indonesians or Chinese who keep them as pets. Additionally, some infants are sent by ship to Thailand, where they are sold on the black market for up to $55,000.

The illegal trade of orangutans as pets contributes to the severe decline of population, as often mothers are killed for the sole reason of selling the infant. Additionally, the orphans regularly do not survive the conditions they are kept in as pets, especially during transportation to other countries. It has been estimated that for every infant sold, between 1 and 6 adult orangutans are killed.

== History of endangerment ==
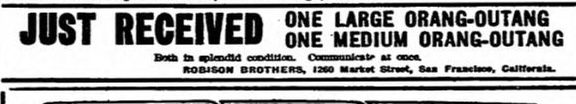
"Orang-Outangs for sale," advertisement in the carnivals and circuses section of Billboard magazine, 1917

=== Decline of population ===
Due to an expanding global demand for timber in the 1980s, this rate then increased; according to a satellite study, 56% or 2.9 million hectares of tropical rainforests in Kalimantan, Borneo were extracted between 1985 and 2001, with a rapid increase in deforestation rates in the late 1990s. The rate of deforestation during this time directly correlates with the decrease in orangutan population, as the species cannot survive in other areas. It is estimated that since 1950, the orangutan population has declined by 60%. Between 1999 and 2015, the population of Bornean orangutans decreased by 100,000 individuals.

Although the current population of orangutans is not precisely known, it is estimated that currently there are about 104,000 Bornean orangutans, 14,000 Sumatran orangutans, and 800 Tapanuli orangutans remaining in the wild, and 1,000 are being held in conservation sites.

=== Future predictions ===
It is predicted that the current rate of forest loss, poaching and illegal pet trading in Borneo will continue, therefore it is presumed that by the 2050s the population of orangutans will continue to decline an additional 45,000 individuals. By 2025, it was estimated that there were 47,000 Bornean orangutans left in the wild.

== Conservation ==
Due to the dramatic decrease of the orangutan population, a number of conservation sites and not-for-profit organisations have been developed in an effort to prevent the extinction of orangutans. There are two main strategies that have been put in place to prevent this; rehabilitation of abandoned individuals or those that were previously being held illegally, and the protection of forest areas and prevention of deforestation in orangutan habitats. Through a Geographic Information System (GIS) analysis, it was discovered that neither strategy was highly effective; however, the cost of preventing deforestation is one twelfth of the cost of reintroducing individuals. It was concluded that for long term protection, it is more efficient to prevent logging than attempting to maintain current populations.

There are other methods that have been put in place to conserve the current orangutan population, these include research and monitoring, land and water protection, species management, education to create awareness, international legislation, and international management and trade controls. Additionally, some organisations that work to conserve the population of orangutans have put in efforts to work alongside palm oil companies and local governments to prevent further habitat loss. For example in 2011 a tri-party agreement was signed by one of the world's largest palm oil producers Wilmar International, Central Kalimantan government, and Borneo Orangutan Survival Foundation (BOSF). The agreement was formed with the aim to provide long-term protection for Bornean orangutans, including monitoring palm oil plantation methods, establishing areas where orangutans can be protected, relocating abandoned individuals and providing training to plantation workers on how to manage orangutans and avoid conflict. World Wild Life (WWL) is in collaboration with TRAFFIC in attempts to stop orangutan trafficking and trading by enforcing strict rules and regulations through the governments, as well as rescuing orangutans that have been trafficked and releasing them back in the wild once they have been rehabilitated in refuges.

Scientists have researched and estimated that the only way of reducing the high rate of population decline is by ceasing deforestation in orangutan habitats, and putting extensive protection methods of current populations in place. However, due to the high demand of the palm oil product and lack of funding from the government, it is extremely unlikely the rapid decline and eventual extinction of orangutans can be prevented.

The tropical rainforests of Sumatra, home to the Sumatran orangutan and Tapanuli orangutan, have been a UNESCO World Heritage Site since 2004.

=== Conservation actions required to prevent extinction ===
According to the IUCN Redlist, there are many conservation actions in place that have been somewhat successful; however, there are numerous actions that are required in order to prevent the further endangerment and eventual extinction of orangutans. These include more area protection, species recovery, habitat and natural process restoration, resource protection and legislation. Additionally, IUCN suggests that more research is required, surrounding areas such as taxonomy, population size, distribution and trends, threats to orangutans, and area-based management plans.
