= Hydrodeoxygenation =

Chemical process for removing oxygen from a compound

Hydrodeoxygenation (HDO) is a hydrogenolysis process for removing oxygen from oxygen-containing compounds. Typical HDO catalysts commonly are sulfided nickel-molybdenum or cobalt-molybdenum on gamma alumina. An idealized reaction is:

R_{2}O + 2 H_{2} → H_{2}O + 2 RH

The first review on HDO was published in 1983. HDO is of interest in producing biofuels, which are derived from oxygen-rich precursors like sugars or lipids. An example of a biomass refining process employing hydrodeoxygenation is the NEXBTL process.

HDO of biomass fast pyrolysis vapors under low hydrogen pressures have recently attracted a lot of attention. Bulk molybdenum trioxide (MoO_{3}) was used as catalyst and found to completely deoxygenate cellulose, corn stover, and lignin pyrolysis vapors and produce a stream of hydrocarbons including aromatics, alkenes, and alkanes. From an economic viewpoint, only aromatics and alkenes should ideally be produced to enable product incorporation into the existing infrastructure.
