= United States Office of Special Counsel (disambiguation) =

The United States Office of Special Counsel is an independent U.S. government agency that protects civil service employees from unfair personnel practices.

Other offices with similar names include:

- Special Counsel, formally known as Special Prosecutor, charged with investigating alleged misconduct in the Executive Branch
- U.S. Department of Justice Office of Special Counsel, the predecessor to the United States Office of Special Counsel
- Office of Special Counsel for Immigration-Related Unfair Employment Practices, within the U.S. Department of Justice
- White House Counsel (also called Counsel to the President), a staff appointee of the President of the United States
