= Biofactories =

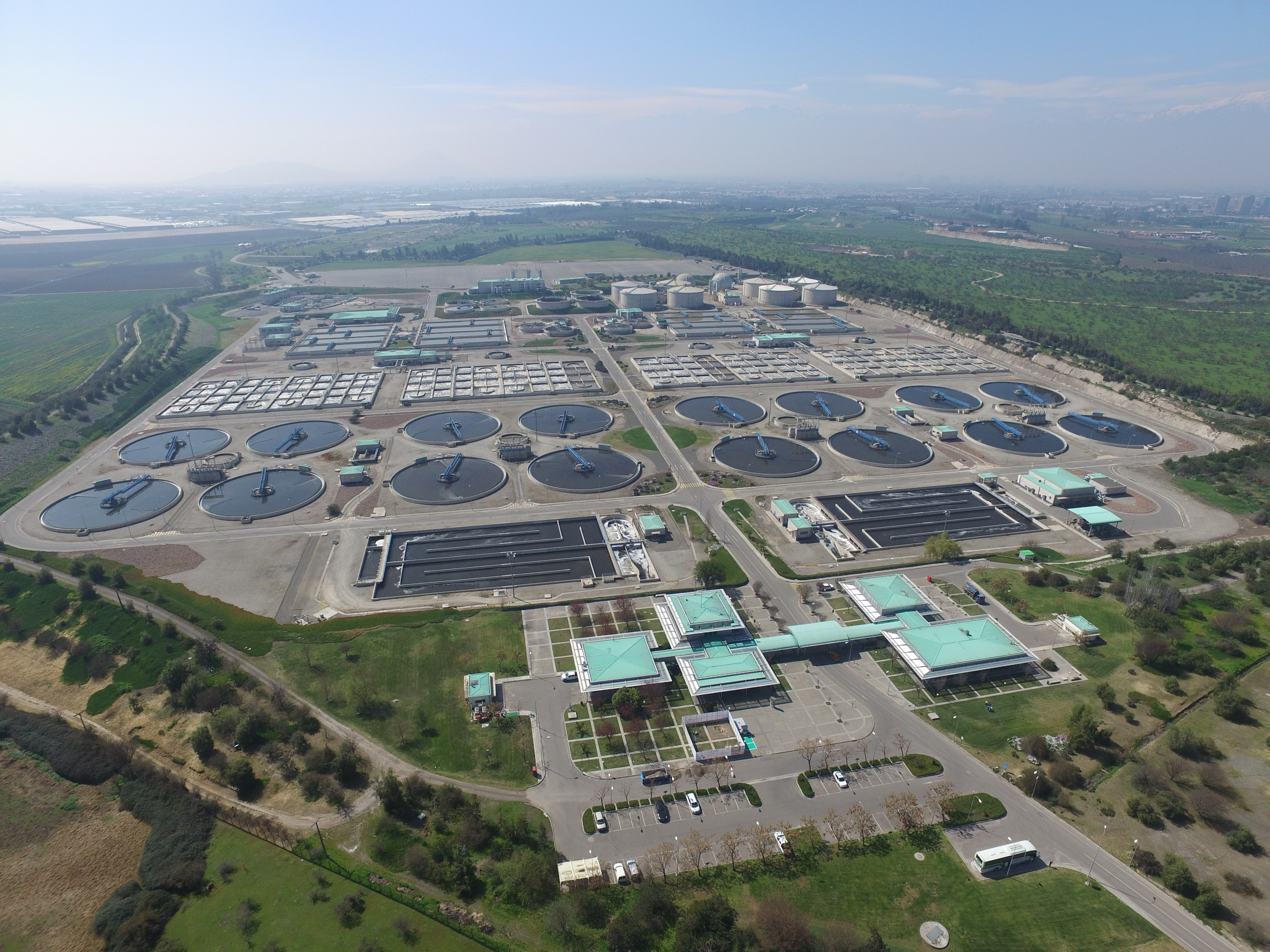
Biofactoria Gran Santiago

The name biofactory comes from the improvements which different installments of traditional health services (wastewater treatment and water treatment plants) have been through; this has been done by reassessing them into a Circular Economy (CE). The concept was first used by Chilean company Aguas Andinas’ CEO, Narcís Berberana. Yves Lesty, Carlos Castro and Lisette Gajardo were the engineers that took part in its origin.

Overall, biofactories have gone from a lineal processing approach, where resources are extracted and then processed, thus generating waste; to factories that supply with new valuable resources, such as electricity, natural gas, agricultural fertilizer or clean water, which are obtained from what it used to be considered as waste.

The first biofactory complex was created in 2017 by Aguas Andinas, when this new strategy was applied to its different wastewater treatment plants, La Farfana and Mapocho-Trebal; and La Florida water treatment plant, grouping them all together under the name of Biofactoría Gran Santiago.

During its first year, Biofactoría Gran Santiago generated a total of 51.792.240 kWh of electrical energy, 160.337 BTU of biogas, 111.842 tonnes of fertilizer destined to agricultural crops, and 603 millions cubic metre of clean water that was returned to its natural sources.

== Principles ==
According to the company that coined this new concept, biofactories operate under 6 main principles:

1. Water run: Using the energy of water as a resource, they create new opportunities for its use after being cleaned; such as irrigation and underwater aquifer refill.
2. Run with its own energy: Using a renewable source such as water, the main objective of a biofactory is to take over the total amount of its operations’ electrical requirements and feed its own system, both as energy and as biomethane.
3. Waste transformation: They understand waste as a source of new resources, such as the mud that comes from the process of wastewater cleaning, which is used as agricultural fertilizer.
4. Air protection: Within its facilities, they have deodorization systems that neutralize the odour, they reduce gas emission, and they take over the reforestation of its surroundings; minimizing its environmental impact.
5. Biodiversity protection: They promote initiatives that generate an optimal ecosystem for wildlife. A few of them are the cleansing of rivers contaminated with wastewater, the preservation of its environment, and the creation of artificial lakes that aim to protect the same environment.
6. Social involvement:
  - Community engagement: Funding of social initiatives.
  - Collaboration with other companies: Boosting of projects that deal with the processing of water that comes from other areas.
  - Research: Enhancing both biotechnology and process engineering investigations.

== Acknowledgements ==
In September 2018, Aguas Andinas’ biofactory project was awarded with the Momentum for Change recognition, given by the United Nations (UN) during its Climate Change conference; acknowledging its contribution to this new strategy that seeks to prevent climate change.

Furthermore, in October 2018, Chilean foundation Recyclápolis gave its Recyclápolis Environmental National Award to Biofactoría Gran Santiago's biomethanation plant, implemented by Chilean companies Metrogás and Aguas Andinas.
