= Microbial oil =

Single cell oil, also known as Microbial oil consists of the intracellular storage lipids, triacyglycerols. It is similar to vegetable oil, another biologically produced oil. They are produced by oleaginous microorganisms, which is the term for those bacteria, molds, algae and yeast, which can accumulate 20% to 80% lipids of their biomass. The accumulation of lipids take place by the end of logarithmic phase and continues during station phase until carbon source begins to reduce with nutrition limitation.

The most important source is some species of yeast, that are able to convert food into triglycerides and accumulate the produced lipids when fed carbohydrates. Production of microbial oil has been researched for production of biodiesel, because impure carbohydrates such as agricultural residues, e.g. waste molasses can be used as a feedstock for production of oil.

== Production of SCO ==
The microbial production of SCO can be conducted by submerged (SmF) or solid state fermentation (SSF). The most frequently used carbon source is glucose. The cellular lipid contents above 60% were generated with xylose, glucose and fructose as substrates using Mortierella isabellina. The selection of a suitable carbon source is necessary but, the nitrogen source influences the accumulation of SCO. As well organic and inorganic nitrogen sources are used individually or in combination in the literature. These include yeast extract, urea, peptone, glycine, KNO_{3}, NH_{4}NO_{3}, and (NH_{4})_{2}SO_{4}. The C/N ratio influences the lipid accumulation. Reported ratios range from 35 to 340 mol mol−1. In principle, oleaginous microorganisms can be cultivated as batch, fed-batch or continuous cultures. The cultivation of M. alpina in a stirred tank reactor resulted in an increase of lipid accumulated in the cells compared to shaking flasks.

== Disruption ==
Cell disruption is very important, because efficiency of cell disruption directly influences subsequent downstream operations and overall extraction efficiencies. This can be achieved by mechanical and non-mechanical method.

=== Bead Milling ===
The cell are disintegrated by the impact of grinding beads and biomass as well as by compaction and shearing actions and the resulting energy transfer. Cell disruption by bead milling is simple, effective, and suitable for a wide range of microorganisms.

=== Homogenization ===
By homogenization process, biomass is forced under high pressure through an orifice. Cell disruption efficiency is dependent on applied pressure, number of passes and organisms.

=== Ultrasound ===
Ultrasound using frequencies around 25 kHz is another liquid-shear method which is frequently used in industries and found to be suitable for cell disruption.

=== Decompression ===
Cell disruption by decompression is achieved by mixing cell suspension with pressurized supercritical gas and subsequent release of the pressure. The gas which has entered the cells expands upon pressure release and causes cell disruption due to the high pressure.

=== Osmotic shock ===
Osmotic shock is applied by exposing cells to a medium containing high concentration of a solute, e.g., salt or sugar exerting a high osmotic pressure and the subsequent sudden dilution of the medium resulting in an increase in intracellular pressure. Microorganisms with cell walls are not destroyed by osmotic shock.

== Extraction ==
=== Soxhlet Extraction ===
The Soxhlet extractor was invented by Franz Soxhlet in 1879 for the lipid extraction from milk powder and is one of the most common semi-continuous methods for lipid extraction from solid food samples. The sample is dried, ground to a fine powder and placed on a porous thimble inside the extraction chamber. The sample is extracted by several washing rounds with an organic solvent (originally petroleum ether) under reflux. After extraction, the solvent is evaporated and the residue is weighed, giving the total dry mass of extracted lipid.

=== Folch extraction ===
The Folch extraction method is generally accepted as a standard technique for recovering total lipids. It was originally invented as a simple method for the extraction of total lipids from animal tissues (brain, liver, and muscle) and uses the chloroform:methanol (2:1) solvent system and addition of salts to the crude extract. By washing the crude extract with water or a salt solution, a biphasic system is formed, with the lipid fraction in the lower phase and the non-lipid fraction in the upper (watery) phase.

=== Pressurized liquid extraction ===
Pressurized liquid extraction (PLE) is similar to Soxhlet extraction but uses liquid solvents at elevated temperatures and pressures resulting in an enhanced extraction performance due to enhanced solubility and mass transfer properties. The sample is placed into an extraction cell which is heated to 80–200°C. The solvent is pumped into the extraction cell and remains a certain time, usually 5–10 min, under elevated pressure (10–20 MPa). Subsequently, fresh solvent is introduced and the extract is stored in a collection vial. Finally, the whole solvent is pushed out into the collection vial using pressurized nitrogen.

=== Supercritical fluids extraction ===
Supercritical fluids are defined as any substance above its critical temperature and pressure. In supercritical state, substances have highly desirable properties making them suitable for extractions: they can penetrate into and effuse through solids like a gas, but dissolve lipids or any other analyte like a fluid.

== Applications ==
=== Human nutrition ===
Polyunsaturated fatty acids (PUFAs) are essential for maintaining biofunctions in mammalians like humans since humans cannot synthesize these essential fatty acids, they must be taken up from different food sources like fish oil and liver. Oleaginous microorganism are also potential source for such fatty acids. On an industrial scale fermentative production can be done by submerged (SmF) or solid state fermentation (SSF).

=== Biodiesel ===
SCO can be used for the production of diesel (fatty acid methyl or ethyl esters). Bio Diesel can be produced by plant and animal source but due to environmental concern as large area of land needed for producing plant for diesel. Whereas microbial source uses less space and can be made more productive by using genetic technology for mass production of required compound. However, the high costs of using SCO for biodiesel production hinder the commercial production.

=== Oleochemicals ===
Oleochemicals are usually defined as chemical products derived from plant or animal triacylglycerols. we know now that we can produce it by microbial source too. Oleochemicals include fatty acids, fatty alcohols, and methyl ester. Especially fatty alcohols and ester between a fatty acid and a fatty alcohol (wax ester) can be applied in various industries, e.g., in soaps, detergents, cosmetic additives, pheromones, and flavors. Furthermore, we can use metabolite engineering to produce fatty alcohol and wax ester from non-oleaginous organism.
