= Coal liquefaction =

Process of converting coal into liquid hydrocarbons

Coal liquefaction is a chemical process that converts solid coal into liquid hydrocarbons, including synthetic fuels and petrochemicals. Often referred to as "coal-to-liquids" (CTL) or more broadly "carbon-to-X" (where X represents various hydrocarbon-based products), coal liquefaction offers an alternative to conventional petroleum-derived fuels. The process can be classified into two main approaches: direct liquefaction (DCL), which chemically transforms coal into liquid products using high pressure and hydrogen, and indirect liquefaction (ICL), which first gasifies coal into synthesis gas (a mixture of carbon monoxide and hydrogen) that is subsequently converted into liquid fuels, often through the Fischer–Tropsch synthesis.

Coal liquefaction has played a significant historical role, particularly in countries lacking domestic oil reserves. It was extensively developed in Germany during the early 20th century and used to supply fuels during World War II. In the 1950s, South Africa adopted CTL technology through the state-owned company Sasol to enhance energy security, a practice that continues to this day. In recent decades, countries such as China have expanded coal liquefaction projects to meet growing energy demands.

While coal liquefaction can contribute to energy independence, it raises environmental concerns, particularly regarding high carbon dioxide emissions and water consumption. Ongoing research focuses on improving efficiency, integrating biomass, and incorporating carbon capture technologies to mitigate environmental impacts. Despite economic and ecological challenges, coal liquefaction remains a topic of global interest, especially in regions with abundant coal reserves and limited access to crude oil.

== Historical background ==
Coal liquefactions originally was developed at the beginning of the 20th century. The best-known CTL process is Fischer–Tropsch synthesis (FT), named after the inventors Franz Fischer and Hans Tropsch from the Kaiser Wilhelm Institute in the 1920s. The FT synthesis is the basis for indirect coal liquefaction (ICL) technology. Friedrich Bergius, also a German chemist, invented direct coal liquefaction (DCL) as a way to convert lignite into synthetic oil in 1913.

Coal liquefaction was an important part of Adolf Hitler's four-year plan of 1936, and became an integral part of German industry during World War II. During the mid-1930s, companies like IG Farben and Ruhrchemie initiated industrial production of synthetic fuels derived from coal. This led to the construction of twelve DCL plants using hydrogenation and nine ICL plants using Fischer–Tropsch synthesis by the end of World War II. CTL provided 92% of Germany's air fuel and over 50% of its petroleum supply in the 1940s, partially mitigating the lack of fuel for the Nazi military.

The DCL and ICL plants effectively complemented each other rather than competed. The reason for this is that coal hydrogenation yields high quality gasoline for aviation and motors, while FT synthesis chiefly produced high-quality diesel, lubrication oil, and waxes together with some smaller amounts of lower-quality motor gasoline. The DCL plants were also more developed, as lignite – the only coal available in many parts of Germany – worked better with hydrogenation than with FT synthesis. After the war, Germany abandoned its synthetic fuel production as it was made responsible for losing the war, as well as prohibited by the Potsdam Conference in 1945.

In the 1950s, South Africa developed its own CTL technology. The South African Coal, Oil and Gas Corporation (Sasol) was founded in 1950 as part of industrialization process that the South African government considered essential for continued economic development and autonomy. South Africa had no known domestic oil reserves at the time, and this made the country very vulnerable to disruption of supplies coming from outside, albeit for different reasons at different times. Sasol was a successful way to protect the country's balance of payment against the increasing dependence on foreign oil. For years its principal product was synthetic fuel, and this business enjoyed significant government protection in South Africa during the apartheid years for its contribution to domestic energy security.

Although it was generally much more expensive to produce oil from coal than from natural petroleum, the political as well as economic importance of achieving as much independence as possible in this sphere was sufficient to overcome any objections. Early attempts to attract private capital, foreign or domestic, were unsuccessful, and it was only with state support that the coal liquefaction could start. CTL continued to play a vital part in South Africa's national economy, providing around 30% of its domestic fuel demand. The democratization of South Africa in the 1990s made Sasol search for products that could prove more competitive in the global marketplace; as of the new millennium the company was focusing primarily on its petrochemical business, as well as on efforts to convert natural gas into crude oil (GTL) using its expertise in Fischer–Tropsch synthesis.

== Methods ==
Specific liquefaction technologies generally fall into two categories: direct liquefaction (DCL) and indirect liquefaction (ICL) processes. Direct processes are based on approaches such as carbonization, pyrolysis, and hydrogenation.

Indirect liquefaction processes generally involve gasification of coal to a mixture of carbon monoxide and hydrogen, often known as synthesis gas or simply syngas. Using the Fischer–Tropsch process syngas is converted into liquid hydrocarbons.

In contrast, direct liquefaction processes convert coal into liquids directly without having to rely on intermediate steps by breaking down the organic structure of coal with application of hydrogen-donor solvent, often at high pressures and temperatures. Since liquid hydrocarbons generally have a higher hydrogen-carbon molar ratio than coals, either hydrogenation or carbon-rejection processes must be employed in both ICL and DCL technologies.

At industrial scales (i.e. thousands of barrels/day) a coal liquefaction plant typically requires multibillion-dollar capital investments.

=== Pyrolysis and carbonization processes ===
A number of carbonization processes exist. The carbonization conversion typically occurs through pyrolysis or destructive distillation. It produces condensable coal tar, oil and water vapor, non-condensable synthetic gas, and a solid residue - char.

One typical example of carbonization is the Karrick process. In this low-temperature carbonization process, coal is heated at 680 °F (360 °C) to 1,380 °F (750 °C) in the absence of air. These temperatures optimize the production of coal tars richer in lighter hydrocarbons than normal coal tar. However, any produced liquids are mostly a by-product and the main product is semi-coke - a solid and smokeless fuel.

The COED Process, developed by FMC Corporation, uses a fluidized bed for processing, in combination with increasing temperature, through four stages of pyrolysis. Heat is transferred by hot gases produced by combustion of part of the produced char. A modification of this process, the COGAS Process, involves the addition of gasification of char. The TOSCOAL Process, an analogue to the TOSCO II oil shale retorting process and Lurgi–Ruhrgas process, which is also used for the shale oil extraction, uses hot recycled solids for the heat transfer.

Liquid yields of pyrolysis and the Karrick process are generally considered too low for practical use for synthetic liquid fuel production. The resulting coal tars and oils from pyrolysis generally require further treatment before they can be usable as motor fuels; they are processed by hydrotreating to remove sulfur and nitrogen species, after which they are finally processed into liquid fuels.

In summary, the economic viability of this technology is questionable.

=== Hydrogenation processes ===
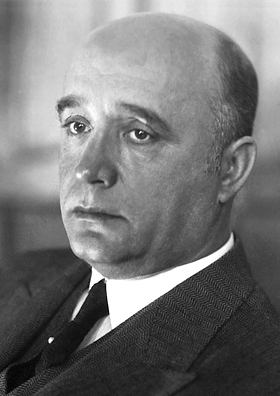
Friedrich Bergius

One of the main methods of direct conversion of coal to liquids by hydrogenation process is the Bergius process, developed by Friedrich Bergius in 1913. In this process, dry coal is mixed with heavy oil recycled from the process. A catalyst is typically added to the mixture. The reaction occurs at between 400 °C (752 °F) to 500 °C (932 °F) and 20 to 70 MPa hydrogen pressure. The reaction can be summarized as follows:
$$n \ce{C} + (n + 1) \ce{H2 -> C}{}_n \ce{H}_{2 n + 2}$$

After World War I several plants based on this technology were built in Germany; these plants were extensively used during World War II to supply Germany with fuel and lubricants. The Kohleoel Process, developed in Germany by Ruhrkohle and VEBA, was used in the demonstration plant with the capacity of 200 ton of lignite per day, built in Bottrop, Germany. This plant operated from 1981 to 1987. In this process, coal is mixed with a recycle solvent and iron catalyst. After preheating and pressurizing, H_{2} is added. The process takes place in a tubular reactor at the pressure of 300 bar (30 MPa; 4,400 psi) and at the temperature of 470 °C (880 °F). This process was also explored by SASOL in South Africa.

During the 1970s and 1980s, Japanese companies Nippon Kokan, Sumitomo Metal Industries, and Mitsubishi Heavy Industries developed the NEDOL process. In this process, coal is mixed with a recycled solvent and a synthetic iron-based catalyst; after preheating, H_{2} is added. The reaction takes place in a tubular reactor at a temperature between 430 °C (810 °F) and 465 °C (870 °F) at the pressure 150–200 bar (15–20 MPa; 2,200–2,900 psi). The produced oil has low quality and requires intensive upgrading.

H-Coal process, developed by Hydrocarbon Research, Inc., in 1963, mixes pulverized coal with recycled liquids, hydrogen and catalyst in the ebullated bed reactor. Advantages of this process are that dissolution and oil upgrading are taking place in the single reactor, products have high H/C ratio, and a fast reaction time, while the main disadvantages are high gas yield (this is basically a thermal cracking process), high hydrogen consumption, and limitation of oil usage only as a boiler oil because of impurities.

The SRC-I and SRC-II (Solvent Refined Coal) processes were developed by Gulf Oil and implemented as pilot plants in the United States in the 1960s and 1970s.

The Nuclear Utility Services Corporation developed hydrogenation process which was patented by Wilburn C. Schroeder in 1976. The process involved dried, pulverized coal mixed with roughly 1wt% molybdenum catalysts. Hydrogenation occurred by use of high temperature and pressure synthesis gas produced in a separate gasifier. The process ultimately yielded a synthetic crude product, naphtha, a limited amount of C_{3}/C_{4} gas, light-medium weight liquids (C_{5}-C_{10}) suitable for use as fuels, small amounts of NH_{3} and significant amounts of CO_{2}. Other single-stage hydrogenation processes are the Exxon Donor Solvent Process, the Imhausen High-pressure Process, and the Conoco Zinc Chloride Process.

There are also a number of two-stage direct liquefaction processes; however, after the 1980s only the Catalytic Two-stage Liquefaction Process, modified from the H-Coal Process; the Liquid Solvent Extraction Process by British Coal; and the Brown Coal Liquefaction Process of Japan have been developed.

Shenhua, a Chinese coal mining company, decided in 2002 to build a direct liquefaction plant in Erdos, Inner Mongolia (Erdos CTL), with barrel capacity of 20 thousand barrels per day (3.2×10^{3} m^{3}/d) of liquid products including diesel oil, liquefied petroleum gas (LPG) and naphtha (petroleum ether). First tests were implemented at the end of 2008. A second and longer test campaign was started in October 2009. In 2011, Shenhua Group reported that the direct liquefaction plant had been in continuous and stable operations since November 2010, and that Shenhua had made 800 million yuan ($125.1 million) in earnings before taxes in the first six months of 2011 on the project.

Chevron Corporation developed a process invented by Joel W. Rosenthal called the Chevron Coal Liquefaction Process (CCLP). It is unique due to the close-coupling of the non-catalytic dissolver and the catalytic hydroprocessing unit. The oil produced had properties that were unique when compared to other coal oils; it was lighter and had far fewer heteroatom impurities. The process was scaled-up to the 6 ton per day level, but not proven commercially.

=== Indirect conversion processes ===
Indirect coal liquefaction (ICL) processes operate in two stages. In the first stage, coal is converted into syngas (a purified mixture of CO and H_{2} gas). In the second stage, the syngas is converted into light hydrocarbons using one of three main processes: Fischer–Tropsch synthesis, methanol synthesis with subsequent conversion to gasoline or petrochemicals, and methanation. Fischer–Tropsch is the oldest of the ICL processes.

In methanol synthesis processes syngas is converted to methanol, which is subsequently polymerized into alkanes over a zeolite catalyst. This process, under the moniker MTG (MTG for "Methanol To Gasoline"), was developed by Mobil in the early 1970s, and is being tested at a demonstration plant by Jincheng Anthracite Mining Group (JAMG) in Shanxi, China. Based on this methanol synthesis, China has also developed a strong coal-to-chemicals industry, with outputs such as olefins, MEG, DME and aromatics.

Methanation reaction converts syngas to substitute natural gas (SNG). The Great Plains Gasification Plant in Beulah, North Dakota is a coal-to-SNG facility producing 160 million cubic feet per day of SNG, and has been in operation since 1984. Several coal-to-SNG plants are in operation or in project in China, South Korea and India.

In another application of gasification, hydrogen extracted from synthetic gas reacts with nitrogen to form ammonia. Ammonia then reacts with carbon dioxide to produce urea.

The above instances of commercial plants based on indirect coal liquefaction processes, as well as many others not listed here including those in planning stages and under construction, are tabulated in the Gasification Technologies Council's World Gasification Database.

== Environmental considerations ==
Typically coal liquefaction processes are associated with significant CO_{2} emissions from the gasification process or as well as from generation of necessary process heat and electricity inputs to the liquefaction reactors, thus releasing greenhouse gases that can contribute to anthropogenic global warming. This is especially true if coal liquefaction is conducted without any carbon capture and storage technologies. There are technically feasible low-emission configurations of CTL plants.

High water consumption in the water-gas shift reaction or steam methane reforming is another adverse environmental effect.

In the United States, the Renewable Fuel Standard and low-carbon fuel standard, such as enacted in the State of California, reflect an increasing demand for low carbon footprint fuels. Also, legislation in the United States has restricted the military's use of alternative liquid fuels to only those demonstrated to have life-cycle greenhouse gas emissions less than or equal to those of their conventional petroleum-based equivalent, as required by Section 526 of the Energy Independence and Security Act of 2007 (EISA).

== Research and development of coal liquefaction ==
The United States military has an active program to promote alternative fuels use, and utilizing vast domestic U.S. coal reserves to produce fuels through coal liquefaction would have obvious economic and security advantages. But with their higher carbon footprint, fuels from coal liquefaction face the significant challenge of reducing life-cycle GHG emissions to competitive levels, which demands continued research and development of liquefaction technology to increase efficiency and reduce emissions. A number of avenues of research & development will need to be pursued, including:

- Carbon capture and storage including enhanced oil recovery and developmental CCS methods to offset emissions from both synthesis and utilization of liquid fuels from coal,
- Coal/biomass/natural gas feedstock blends for coal liquefaction: Utilizing carbon-neutral biomass and hydrogen-rich natural gas as co-feeds in coal liquefaction processes has significant potential for bringing fuel products' life-cycle GHG emissions into competitive ranges,
- Hydrogen from renewables: the hydrogen demand of coal liquefaction processes might be supplied through renewable energy sources including wind, solar, and biomass, significantly reducing the emissions associated with traditional methods of hydrogen synthesis (such as steam methane reforming or char gasification), and
- Process improvements such as intensification of the Fischer–Tropsch process, hybrid liquefaction processes, and more efficient air separation technologies needed for production of oxygen (e.g. ceramic membrane-based oxygen separation).

Since 2014, the U.S. Department of Energy and the Department of Defense have been collaborating on supporting new research and development in the area of coal liquefaction to produce military-specification liquid fuels, with an emphasis on jet fuel, which would be both cost-effective and in accordance with EISA Section 526. Projects underway in this area are described under the U.S. Department of Energy National Energy Technology Laboratory's Advanced Fuels Synthesis R&D area in the Coal and Coal-Biomass to Liquids Program.

Every year, a researcher or developer in coal conversion is rewarded by the industry in receiving the World Carbon To X Award. The 2016 Award recipient is Mr. Jona Pillay, executive director for Gasification & CTL, Jindal Steel & Power Ltd (India). The 2017 Award recipient is Dr. Yao Min, Deputy General Manager of Shenhua Ningxia Coal Group (China).

In terms of commercial development, coal conversion is experiencing a strong acceleration. Geographically, most active projects and recently commissioned operations are located in Asia, mainly in China, while U.S. projects have been delayed or canceled due to the development of shale gas and shale oil.

== Coal liquefaction plants and projects ==
=== Non-U.S. ===
Non-U.S. coal to liquid fuels projects
Project	Developer	Locations	Type	Products	Start of operations
Sasol Synfuels II (West) & Sasol Synfuels III (East)	Sasol (Pty) Ltd.	Secunda, South Africa	CTL	160,000 BPD; primary products gasoline and light olefins (alkenes)	1977(II)/1983(III)
Shenhua Direct Coal Liquefaction Plant	Shenhua Group	Erdos, Inner Mongolia, China	CTL (direct liquefaction)	20,000 BPD; primary products diesel fuel, liquefied petroleum gas, naphtha	2008
Yitai CTL Plant	Yitai Coal Oil Manufacturing Co., Ltd.	Ordos, Zhungeer, China	CTL	160,000 mt/a Fischer–Tropsch liquids	2009
Jincheng MTG Plant	Jincheng Anthracite Mining Co., Ltd.	Jincheng, China	CTL	300,000 t/a methanol from MTG process	2009
Sasol Synfuels	Sasol (Pty) Ltd.	Secunda, South Africa	CTL	3,960,000 (Nm^{3}/d) syngas capacity; Fischer–Tropsch liquids	2011
Shanxi Lu'an CTL Plant	Shanxi Lu'an Co. Ltd.	Lu'an, China	CTL	160,000 mt/a Fischer–Tropsch liquids	2014
ICM Coal to Liquids Plant	Industrial Corporation of Mongolia LLC (ICM)	Tugrug Nuur, Mongolia	CTL	13,200,000 (Nm^{3}/d) syngas capacity; gasoline	2015
Yitai Yili CTL Plant	Yitai Yili Energy Co.	Yili, China	CTL	30,000 BPD Fischer–Tropsch liquids	2015
Yitai Ordos CTL Plant Phase II	Yitai	Ordos, Zhungeer-Dalu, China	CTL	46,000 BPD Fischer–Tropsch liquids	2016
Yitai Ürümqi CTL Plant	Yitai	Guanquanbao, Urunqi, China	CTL	46,000 BPD Fischer–Tropsch liquids	2016
Shenhua Ningxia CTL Project	Shenhua Group Corporation Ltd	Yinchuan, Ningxia, China	CTL	4 million tonnes/year of diesel and naphtha	2016
Clean Carbon Industries	Clean Carbon Industries	Tete province, Mozambique	Coal waste-to-liquids	65,000 BPD fuel	2020

=== United States ===
U.S. coal to liquid fuels projects
Project	Developer	Locations	Type	Products	Status
Adams Fork Energy - TransGas WV CTL	TransGas Development Systems (TGDS)	Mingo County, West Virginia	CTL	7,500 TPD of coal to 18,000 BPD gasoline and 300 BPD LPG	Operations 2016 or later
CleanTech Energy Project	USA Synthetic Fuel Corp. (USASF)	Wyoming	Synthetic crude oil	30.6 mm bbls/year of synthetic crude (or 182 billion cubic feet per year)	Planning/financing not secured
FEDC Healy CTL	Fairbanks Economic Development Corp. (FEDC)	Fairbanks, Alaska	CTL/GTL	4.2–11.4 million TPY Healy-mined coal; c. 40k BPD liquid fuels; 110 MW	Planning
Future Fuels Kentucky CTL	Future Fuels, Kentucky River Properties	Perry County, Kentucky	CTL	Not specified. Coal to methanol and other chemicals (over 100 million tons of coal supply)	Active
Lima Energy Project	USA Synthetic Fuel Corp. (USASF)	Lima, Ohio	IGCC/SNG/H_{2}, polygeneration	Three phases: 1) 2.7 million barrels of oil equivalent (BOE), 2) expand to 5.3 million BOE (3) expand to 8.0 million BOE (47 billion cf/y), 516 MW	Active
Many Stars CTL	Australian-American Energy Co. (Terra Nova Minerals or Great Western Energy), Crow Nation	Big Horn County, Montana	CTL	First phase: 8,000 BPD liquids	Active (no new information since 2011)
Secure Energy CTL (aka MidAmericaC2L	MidAmericaC2L / Siemens	McCracken County, Kentucky	CTL	10,200 BPD gasoline	Active (no new information since 2011)
US Fuel CTL	US Fuel Corporation	Perry County/Muhlenberg County, Kentucky	CTL	300 tons of coal into 525 BPD liquid fuels including diesel and jet fuel	Active

== See also ==
- Coal-water slurry fuel
- Biomass to liquid
- Synthetic Fuels Corporation, defunct US state corporation
- Synthetic Liquid Fuels Program
- Unconventional (oil and gas) reservoir
