= 1,2,3,4-Tetrahydroquinoline =

Names
- Preferred IUPAC name 1,2,3,4-Tetrahydroquinoline
- Other names Hydroquinoline

Identifiers
CAS Number	635-46-1
3D model (JSmol)	Interactive image
Beilstein Reference	116149
ChEBI	CHEBI:213323
ChEMBL	ChEMBL303611
ChemSpider	62667
ECHA InfoCard	100.010.216
EC Number	211-237-6
Gmelin Reference	27202
PubChem CID	69460
UNII	CCR50N1Z9G
CompTox Dashboard (EPA)	DTXSID8060903
- InChI: InChI=1S/C9H11N/c1-2-6-9-8(4-1)5-3-7-10-9/h1-2,4,6,10H,3,5,7H2 Key: LBUJPTNKIBCYBY-UHFFFAOYSA-N
- SMILES: C1CC2=CC=CC=C2NC1

Properties
Chemical formula	C_{9}H_{11}N
Molar mass	133.194 g·mol^{−1}
Appearance	Colorless oily liquid
Density	1.0599 g/cm^{3}
Melting point	20 °C (68 °F; 293 K)
Boiling point	251 °C (484 °F; 524 K)

Hazards
- GHS labelling
Pictograms	(GHS07: Exclamation mark) (GHS08: Health hazard)
Signal word	Danger
Hazard statements	H315, H319, H335, H350
Precautionary statements	P201, P202, P261, P264, P271, P280, P281, P302+P352, P304+P340, P305+P351+P338, P308+P313, P312, P321, P332+P313, P337+P313, P362, P403+P233, P405, P501

Related compounds
Related compounds	Quinoline, Tetralin, Chromane
- Except where otherwise noted, data are given for materials in their standard state (at 25 °C [77 °F], 100 kPa). Infobox references

Tetrahydroquinoline is an organic compound that is the semi-hydrogenated derivative of quinoline. It is a colorless oil.

== Use ==
Substituted derivatives of tetrahydroquinoline are common in medicinal chemistry. Oxamniquine, dynemycin, viratmycin, and nicainoprol are bioactive tetrahydroquinolines. Typically tetrahydroquinoline derivatives are prepared by hydrogenation of the corresponding quinoline using heterogeneous catalysts.

== Synthesis ==
Tetrahydroquinolines are produced by hydrogenation of quinolines. Because the hydrogenation is reversible, tetrahydroquinoline has been often examined as a hydrogen-donor solvent in coal liquifaction.

Using homogeneous catalysts, asymmetric hydrogenation has been demonstrated. It can also be prepared from 1-indanone (benzocyclopentanone).
