= Yi Li =

Yi Li may refer to:

- Yi Li (basketball) (born 1987), Chinese basketball player
- Li Yi (wushu), wushu athlete from Macau
- Yili (text), Chinese classic text
- Li Yi (triple jumper) (born 2005), Chinese athlete

== See also ==
- Li Yi (disambiguation)
- Yili (disambiguation)
