= Space velocity =

Space velocity may refer to:

- Space velocity (astronomy), the velocity of a star in the galactic coordinate system
- Space velocity (chemistry), the relation between volumetric flow rate and reactor volume in a chemical reactor
