= Upgrader =

Facility that partially refines heavy crude oil

An upgrader is a facility that upgrades conventional heavy crude oil or extra heavy bitumen, or both, into synthetic crude oil. Upgrader plants are typically located close to oil sands production, including: the Athabasca oil sands in Alberta; the heavy crude oil deposits around Lloydminster in Alberta and Saskatchewan; and the Orinoco tar sands in Venezuela.

== Processes ==
Upgrading means using fractional distillation and/or chemical treatment to convert heavy crude oil or bitumen so it can be handled by oil refineries. At a minimum, this means reducing the bitumens viscosity with naphthenic solvents so that it can be pumped through pipelines (bitumen is 1000x more viscous than light crude oil). However this process often also includes some kind of cracking process, as well as separating different fractions and reducing sulfur, nitrogen and metals like nickel and vanadium.

Upgraders typically consist of multiple refinery units and have many variations depending on the required product. Products of an upgrader can be: diluted bitumen, synthetic crude oil (SCO), or refined products (gas oils, distillates and naphtha). Partial upgrading is also possible, where the heavy and sour bitumen viscosity is improved just enough to reduce or eliminate the diluent needs.

Upgrading may involve multiple processes:

- Vacuum distillation to separate lighter fractions, leaving behind a residue with molecular weights over 400.
- De-asphalting the vacuum distillation residue to remove the highest molecular weight alicyclic compounds, which precipitate as black/brown asphaltenes when the mixture is dissolved in C_{3}–C_{7} alkanes, leaving "de-asphalted oil" (DAO) in solution. A mixture of propane and butane will remove metallic compounds that would interfere with hydrotreating.
- Cracking to break long chain molecules into shorter ones. Delayed cokers, and Ebullated bed reactor hydrocrackers ("LC-Finer") are most commonly utilized for cracking.
- Hydrotreating may also be employed to remove sulfur and reduce the level of nitrogen.

Research into using biotechnology to perform some of these processes at lower temperatures and cost is ongoing.

== See also ==
- Canadian Centre for Energy Information
- Co-op Refinery Complex
- History of the petroleum industry in Canada (oil sands and heavy oil)
- Scotford Upgrader
- Syncrude
- Suncor
- Visbreaker
