= Urdo =

Urdo may refer to:

- Urdo, a character from The King's Peace novel

== See also ==
- Urdos, a commune of France
- Urdu, an Indo-Aryan language
- Ordu (disambiguation)
- Ordo (disambiguation)
