= 9,10-Dihydroanthracene =

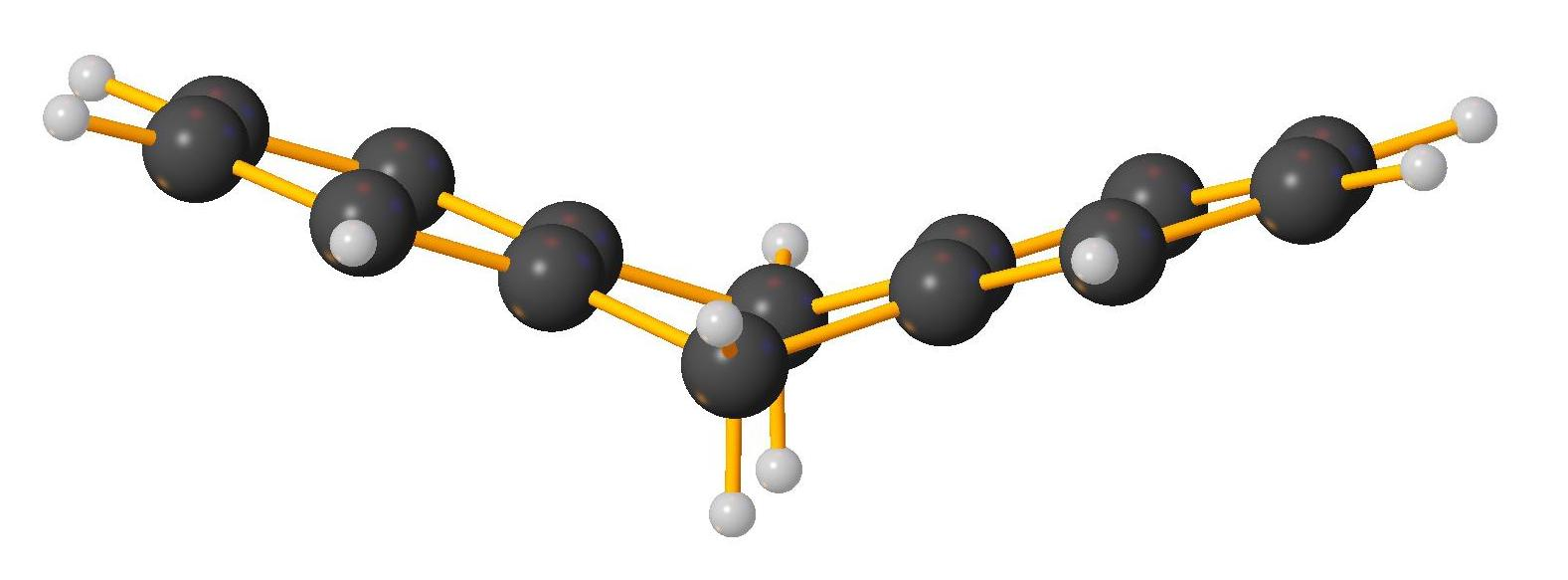

Names
- Preferred IUPAC name 9,10-Dihydroanthracene

Identifiers
CAS Number	613-31-0
3D model (JSmol)	Interactive image
ChemSpider	11446
ECHA InfoCard	100.009.398
PubChem CID	11940
UNII	Z142C238GB
CompTox Dashboard (EPA)	DTXSID3075256
- InChI: InChI=1S/C14H12/c1-2-6-12-10-14-8-4-3-7-13(14)9-11(12)5-1/h1-8H,9-10H2 Key: WPDAVTSOEQEGMS-UHFFFAOYSA-N
- SMILES: c1ccc2c(c1)Cc3ccccc3C2

Properties
Chemical formula	C_{14}H_{12}
Molar mass	180.250 g·mol^{−1}
Appearance	White solid
Density	1.19 g mL^{−1}
Melting point	108 to 109 °C (226 to 228 °F; 381 to 382 K)
Boiling point	312 °C (594 °F; 585 K)
- Except where otherwise noted, data are given for materials in their standard state (at 25 °C [77 °F], 100 kPa). Infobox references

9,10-Dihydroanthracene is an organic compound that is derived from the polycyclic aromatic hydrocarbon anthracene. Several isomers of dihydroanthracene are known, but the 9,10 derivative is most common. It is a colourless solid that is used as a carrier of H_{2} as a hydrogen-donor.

== Preparation ==
Because the aromaticity is not compromised for the flanking rings, anthracene is susceptible to hydrogenation at the 9- and 10- positions. It is produced in the laboratory by dissolving metal reduction using sodium/ethanol, an application of the Bouveault–Blanc reduction. The reduction can be effected by magnesium as well. Finally, it can also be prepared by the coupling of benzyl chloride using aluminium chloride as a catalyst.

The bond dissociation energy for the 9- and 10- carbon–hydrogen bonds are estimated at 78 kcal mol^{−1}. Thus these bonds are about 20% weaker than typical C–H bonds.

== See also ==
- Triptycene — analogue with three phenyl rings
