= Oscillatory baffled reactor =

Chemical reactor

A Continuous Oscillatory Baffled Reactor (COBR) is a specially designed chemical reactor to achieve plug flow under laminar flow conditions. Achieving plug flow has previously been limited to either a large number of continuous stirred-tank reactors (CSTR) in series or conditions with high turbulent flow. The technology incorporates annular baffles to a tubular reactor framework to create eddies when liquid is pushed up through the tube. Likewise, when liquid is on a downstroke through the tube, eddies are created on the other side of the baffles. Eddy generation on both sides of the baffles creates very effective mixing while still maintaining plug flow. By using COBR, potentially higher yields of product can be made with greater control and reduced waste.

Standard design of a COBR including pump and equally spaced baffles

== Design ==
A standard COBR consists of a 10-150mm ID tube with equally spaced baffles throughout. There are typically two pumps in a COBR; one pump is reciprocating to generate continuous oscillatory flow and a second pump creates net flow through the tube. This design offers a control over mixing intensity that conventional tubular reactors cannot achieve. Each baffled cell acts as a CSTR and because a secondary pump is creating a net laminar flow, much longer residence times can be achieved relative to turbulent flow systems.

With conventional tubular reactors, mixing is accomplished through stirring mechanisms or turbulent flow conditions, which is difficult to control. By changing variable values such as baffle spacing or thickness, COBRs can operate with much better mixing control. For instance, it has been found that a spacing of 1.5 times tube diameter size is the most effective mixing condition; furthermore, vortex deformation increases with increase in baffle thickness greater than 3mm.

== Biological applications ==
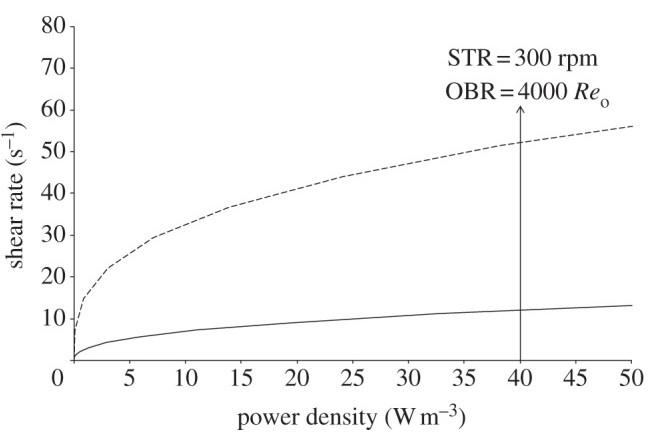
Shear rate of standard tubular reactor is higher than that of COBR for all values of power density

The low shear rate and enhanced mass transfer provided by the COBR makes it an ideal reactor for various biological processes. For shear rate, it has been found that COBRs have an evenly distributed, five-fold reduction in shear rate relative to conventional tubular reactors; this is especially important for biological process given that high shear rates can damage microorganisms.

For the case of mass transfer, COBR fluid mechanics allows for an increase in oxygen gas residence time. Furthermore, the vortexes created in the COBRs causes a gas bubble break-up and thus an increase in surface area for gas transfer. For aerobic biological processes, therefore, COBRs again present an advantage. An especially promising aspect of the COBR technology is its ability to scale-up processes while still retaining the advantages in shear rate and mass transfer.

== Limitations ==
Though the prospect for COBR applications in fields like bioprocessing are very promising, there are a number of necessary improvements to be made before more global use. Clearly, there is additional complexity in the COBR design relative to other bioreactors, which can introduce complications in operation. Furthermore, for bioprocessing it is possible that fouling of baffles and internal surfaces becomes an issue. Perhaps the most significant needed advancement moving forward is further comprehensive studies that COBR technology can indeed be useful in industry. There are currently no COBRs in use at industrial bioprocessing plants and the evidence of its effectiveness, though very promising and theoretically an improvement relative to current reactors in industry, is limited to smaller laboratory-scale experiments.
