= De-asphalter =

A de-asphalter is a unit in a crude oil refinery or bitumen upgrader that separates asphalt from the residuum fraction of crude oil or bitumen. The primary purpose of the separation is to remove contaminants (asphaltenes, metals) from the feed that would cause rapid deactivation of catalysts in downstream processing units. In doing so, the de-asphalter is the first step in a series of processes that upgrade a low-value feedstock to high-value refined products.

The de-asphalter unit is usually placed after the vacuum distillation tower and receives feed from the bottom (residuum) stream. It is usually a solvent de-asphalter unit, SDA. The SDA separates the asphalt from the feedstock because light hydrocarbons will dissolve aliphatic compounds but not asphaltenes. The output from the de-asphalter unit is de-asphalted oil ("DAO") and asphalt.

DAO from propane de-asphalting has the highest quality but lowest yield, whereas using pentane may double or triple the yield from a heavy feed, but at the expense of contamination by metals and carbon residues that shorten the life of downstream cracking catalysts. If the solvent is butane the unit will be referred to as a butane de-asphalter ("BDA") and if the solvent is propane, it will be called a propane de-asphalter ("PDA") unit.
