= AzarAb Industries =

Iranian manufacturing corporation

- Type: Public
- Industry: Construction; Oil Industry; Energy Industry
- Founded: 1985; 41 years ago
- Headquarters: Arak, Iran
- Area served: Worldwide
- Products: Air coolers; Air preheater; Automation; Auxiliary Equipment; Bioreactors; Boilers; Cement production equipment; Cooling towers; Fermenters; Fractionating columns; Heat exchangers; Nuclear Power Plants Equipment; Pressure vessels; Reactors; Sugar plants equipment; Storage tanks; Turbines; Valves; Water Treatment Systems
- Number of employees: +2500
- Divisions: Power, Oil & Gas
- Website: www.azarab.ir

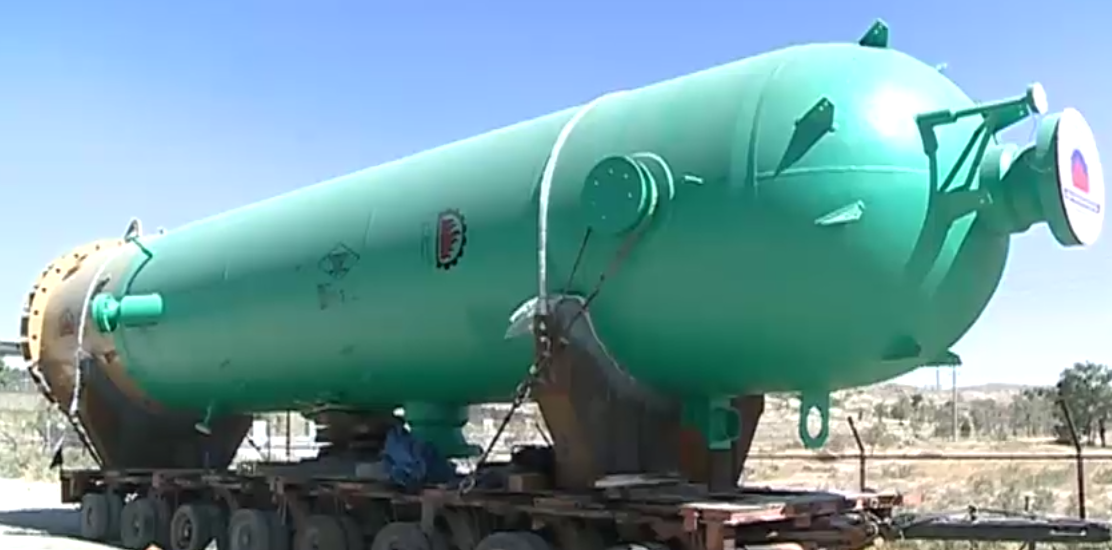
It is one of four giant gas reactors of the Hoveyzeh gas refinery, which are used for gas sweetening, and they are designed and manufactured by AzarAb Industries Corporation.

AzarAb Industries is an Iranian manufacturing corporation that constructs power plants, factories, petrochemical plants and sugar, oil and gas refineries that is located in Arak. As of 2005, AzarAb Industries, employed more than 2,500 people.

Their main products are air preheaters, boilers, butterfly valves, water turbines, reactors, fractionating columns and pressure vessels.

Some of the projects the corporation has worked on are:

- Shahid Rajaie 1000 M.W. Thermal Power Plant, Iran
- Gilan 810 M.W. Combined Cycle Power Plant, Iran
- Abadan Petrochemical Plant, Iran

The corporation has ISO 9001 certification and is a member of the Association of Iranian Industry Equipment Manufacturers.
