= Chemical reactor =

Enclosed volume where interconversion of compounds takes place

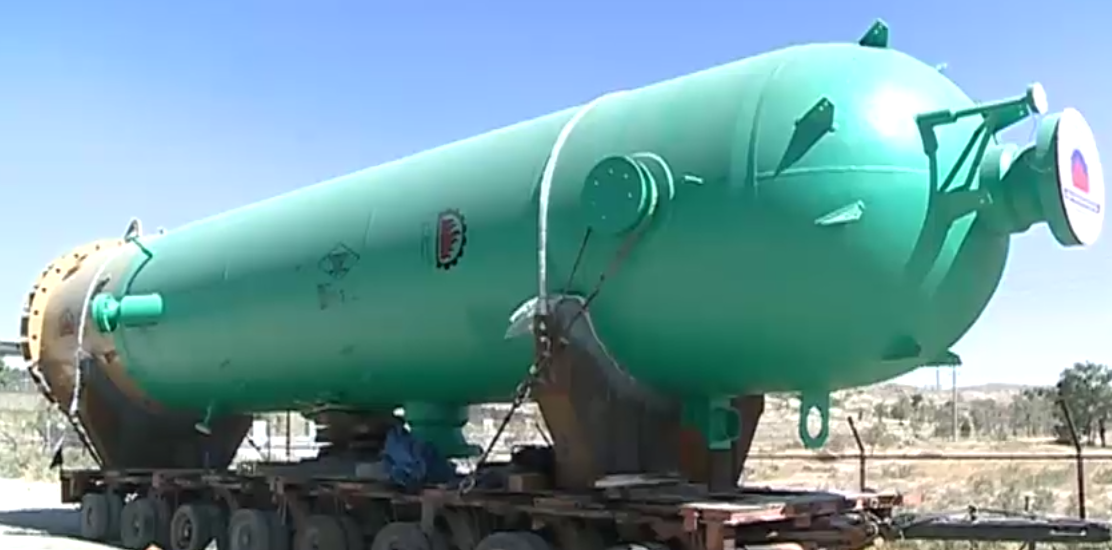
One of four giant gas reactors of the Hoveyzeh gas refinery, which are used for gas sweetening and designed and manufactured by AzarAb Industries Corporation.

A chemical reactor is an enclosed volume in which a chemical reaction takes place. In chemical engineering, it is generally understood to be a process vessel used to carry out a chemical reaction, which is one of the classic unit operations in chemical process analysis. The design of a chemical reactor deals with multiple aspects of chemical engineering. Chemical engineers design reactors to maximize net present value for the given reaction. Designers ensure that the reaction proceeds with the highest efficiency towards the desired output product, producing the highest yield of product while requiring the least money to purchase and operate. Normal operating expenses include energy input, energy removal, raw material costs, labor, etc. Energy changes can come in the form of heating or cooling, pumping to increase pressure, frictional pressure loss or agitation.

Chemical reaction engineering is the branch of chemical engineering which deals with chemical reactors and their design, especially by application of chemical kinetics to industrial systems.

== Overview ==
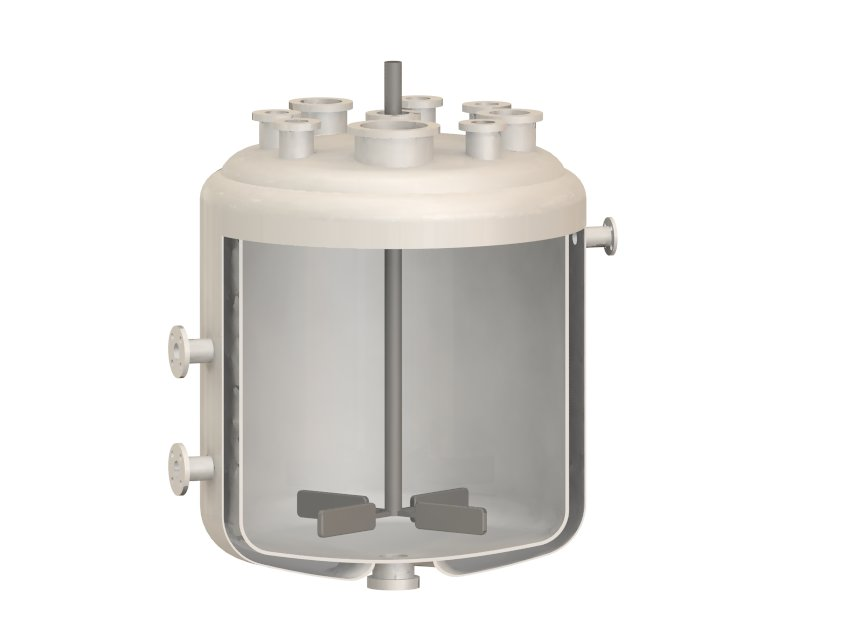
Cut-away view of a stirred-tank chemical reactor with a cooling jacket

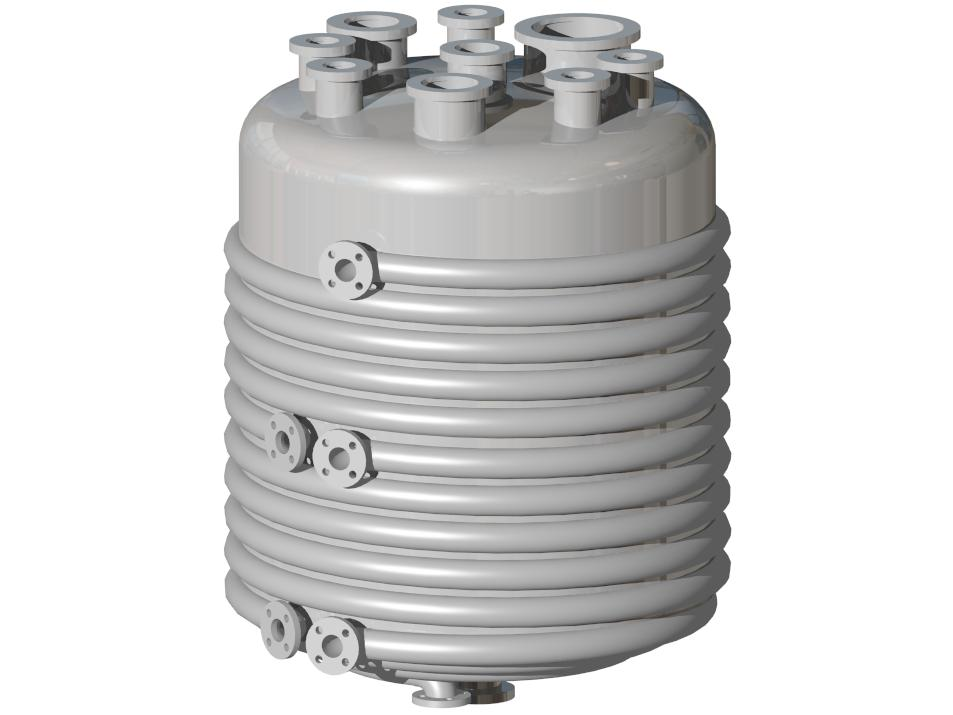
Chemical reactor with half coils wrapped around it

The most common basic types of chemical reactors are tanks (where the reactants mix in the whole volume) and pipes or tubes (for laminar flow reactors and plug flow reactors)

Both types can be used as continuous reactors or batch reactors, and either may accommodate one or more solids (reagents, catalysts, or inert materials), but the reagents and products are typically fluids (liquids or gases). Reactors in continuous processes are typically run at steady-state, whereas reactors in batch processes are necessarily operated in a transient state. When a reactor is brought into operation, either for the first time or after a shutdown, it is in a transient state, and key process variables change with time.

There are three idealised models used to estimate the most important process variables of different chemical reactors:

- Batch reactor model,
- Continuous stirred-tank reactor model (CSTR), and
- Plug flow reactor model (PFR).

Many real-world reactors can be modeled as a combination of these basic types.

Key process variables include:

- Residence time (τ, lower case Greek tau)
- Volume (V)
- Temperature (T)
- Pressure (P)
- Concentrations of chemical species (C_{1}, C_{2}, C_{3}, ... C_{n})
- Heat transfer coefficients (h, U)

A tubular reactor can often be a packed bed. In this case, the tube or channel contains particles or pellets, usually a solid catalyst. The reactants, in liquid or gas phase, are pumped through the catalyst bed. A chemical reactor may also be a fluidized bed; see Fluidized bed reactor.

Chemical reactions occurring in a reactor may be exothermic, meaning giving off heat, or endothermic, meaning absorbing heat. A tank reactor may have a cooling or heating jacket or cooling or heating coils (tubes) wrapped around the outside of its vessel wall to cool down or heat up the contents, while tubular reactors can be designed like heat exchangers if the reaction is strongly exothermic, or like furnaces if the reaction is strongly endothermic.

== Types ==
=== Batch reactor ===
The simplest type of reactor is a batch reactor. Materials are loaded into a batch reactor, and the reaction proceeds with time. A batch reactor does not reach a steady state, and control of temperature, pressure and volume is often necessary. Many batch reactors therefore have ports for sensors and material input and output. Batch reactors are typically used in small-scale production and reactions with biological materials, such as in brewing, pulping, and production of enzymes. One example of a batch reactor is a pressure reactor.

=== CSTR (continuous stirred-tank reactor) ===
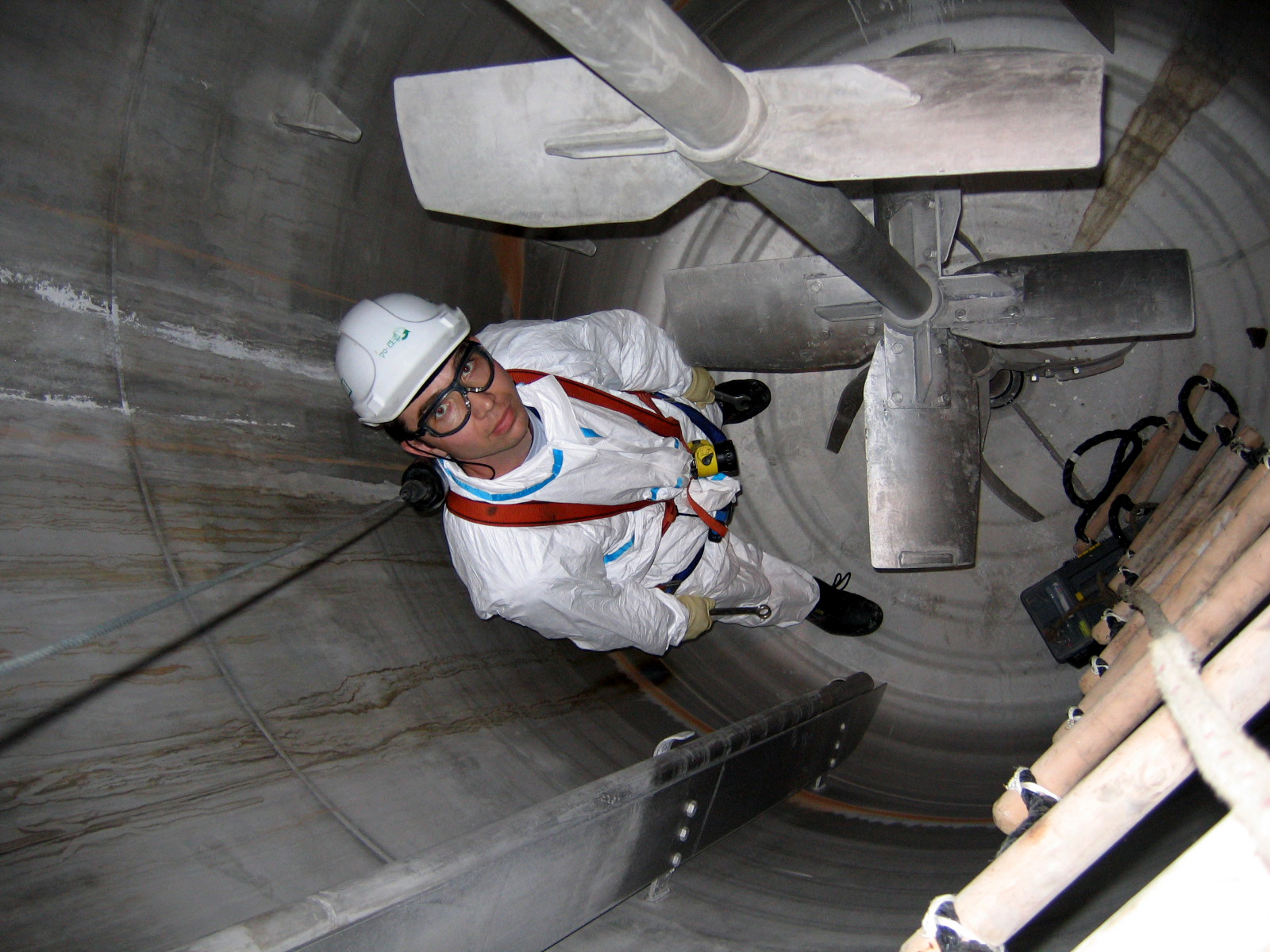
Checking condition inside the case of a continuous stirred tank reactor (CSTR). The impeller (or agitator) blades on the shaft aid mixing. The baffle at the bottom of the image also helps in mixing.

In a CSTR, one or more fluid reagents are introduced into a tank reactor which is typically stirred with an impeller to ensure proper mixing of the reagents while the reactor effluent is removed. Dividing the volume of the tank by the average volumetric flow rate through the tank gives the space time, or the time required to process one reactor volume of fluid. Using chemical kinetics, the reaction's expected percent completion can be calculated. Some important aspects of the CSTR:

- At steady-state, the mass flow rate in must equal the mass flow rate out, otherwise the tank will overflow or go empty (transient state). While the reactor is in a transient state the model equation must be derived from the differential mass and energy balances.
- The reaction proceeds at the reaction rate associated with the final (output) concentration, since the concentration is assumed to be homogenous throughout the reactor.
- Often, it is economically beneficial to operate several CSTRs in series. This allows, for example, the first CSTR to operate at a higher reagent concentration and therefore a higher reaction rate. In these cases, the sizes of the reactors may be varied in order to minimize the total capital investment required to implement the process.
- It can be demonstrated that an infinite number of infinitely small CSTRs operating in series would be equivalent to a PFR.

The behavior of a CSTR is often approximated or modeled by that of a Continuous Ideally Stirred-Tank Reactor (CISTR). All calculations performed with CISTRs assume perfect mixing. If the residence time is 5-10 times the mixing time, this approximation is considered valid for engineering purposes. The CISTR model is often used to simplify engineering calculations and can be used to describe research reactors. In practice it can only be approached, particularly in industrial size reactors in which the mixing time may be very large.

A loop reactor is a hybrid type of catalytic reactor that physically resembles a tubular reactor, but operates like a CSTR. The reaction mixture is circulated in a loop of tube, surrounded by a jacket for cooling or heating, and there is a continuous flow of starting material in and product out.

=== PFR (plug flow reactor) ===
Simple diagram illustrating plug flow reactor model

In a PFR, sometimes called continuous tubular reactor (CTR), one or more fluid reagents are pumped through a pipe or tube. The chemical reaction proceeds as the reagents travel through the PFR. In this type of reactor, the changing reaction rate creates a gradient with respect to distance traversed; at the inlet to the PFR the rate is very high, but as the concentrations of the reagents decrease and the concentration of the product(s) increases the reaction rate slows. Some important aspects of the PFR:

- The idealized PFR model assumes no axial mixing: any element of fluid traveling through the reactor doesn't mix with fluid upstream or downstream from it, as implied by the term "plug flow".
- Reagents may be introduced into the PFR at locations in the reactor other than the inlet. In this way, a higher efficiency may be obtained, or the size and cost of the PFR may be reduced.
- A PFR has a higher theoretical efficiency than a CSTR of the same volume. That is, given the same space-time (or residence time), a reaction will proceed to a higher percentage completion in a PFR than in a CSTR. This is not always true for reversible reactions.

For most chemical reactions of industrial interest, it is impossible for the reaction to proceed to 100% completion. The rate of reaction decreases as the reactants are consumed until the point where the system reaches dynamic equilibrium (no net reaction, or change in chemical species occurs). The equilibrium point for most systems is less than 100% complete. For this reason a separation process, such as distillation, often follows a chemical reactor in order to separate any remaining reagents or byproducts from the desired product. These reagents may sometimes be reused at the beginning of the process, such as in the Haber process. In some cases, very large reactors would be necessary to approach equilibrium, and chemical engineers may choose to separate the partially reacted mixture and recycle the leftover reactants.

Under laminar flow conditions, the assumption of plug flow is highly inaccurate, as the fluid traveling through the center of the tube moves much faster than the fluid at the wall. The continuous oscillatory baffled reactor (COBR) achieves thorough mixing by the combination of fluid oscillation and orifice baffles, allowing plug flow to be approximated under laminar flow conditions.

=== Semibatch reactor ===
A semibatch reactor is operated with both continuous and batch inputs and outputs. A fermenter, for example, is loaded with a batch of medium and microbes which constantly produces carbon dioxide that must be removed continuously. Similarly, reacting a gas with a liquid is usually difficult, because a large volume of gas is required to react with an equal mass of liquid. To overcome this problem, a continuous feed of gas can be bubbled through a batch of a liquid. In general, in semibatch operation, one chemical reactant is loaded into the reactor and a second chemical is added slowly (for instance, to prevent side reactions), or a product which results from a phase change is continuously removed, for example a gas formed by the reaction, a solid that precipitates out, or a hydrophobic product that forms in an aqueous solution.

=== Catalytic reactor ===
Although catalytic reactors are often implemented as plug flow reactors, their analysis requires more complicated treatment. The rate of a catalytic reaction is proportional to the amount of catalyst the reagents contact, as well as the concentration of the reactants. With a solid phase catalyst and fluid phase reagents, this is proportional to the exposed area, efficiency of diffusion of reagents in and products out, and efficacy of mixing. Perfect mixing usually cannot be assumed. Furthermore, a catalytic reaction pathway often occurs in multiple steps with intermediates that are chemically bound to the catalyst; and as the chemical binding to the catalyst is also a chemical reaction, it may affect the kinetics. Catalytic reactions often display so-called falsified kinetics, when the apparent kinetics differ from the actual chemical kinetics due to physical transport effects.

The behavior of the catalyst is also a consideration. Particularly in high-temperature petrochemical processes, catalysts are deactivated by processes such as sintering, coking, and poisoning.

A common example of a catalytic reactor is the catalytic converter that processes toxic components of automobile exhausts. However, most petrochemical reactors are catalytic, and are responsible for most industrial chemical production, with extremely high-volume examples including sulfuric acid, ammonia, reformate/BTEX (benzene, toluene, ethylbenzene and xylene), and fluid catalytic cracking. Various configurations are possible, see Heterogeneous catalytic reactor.
