= Tetralin =

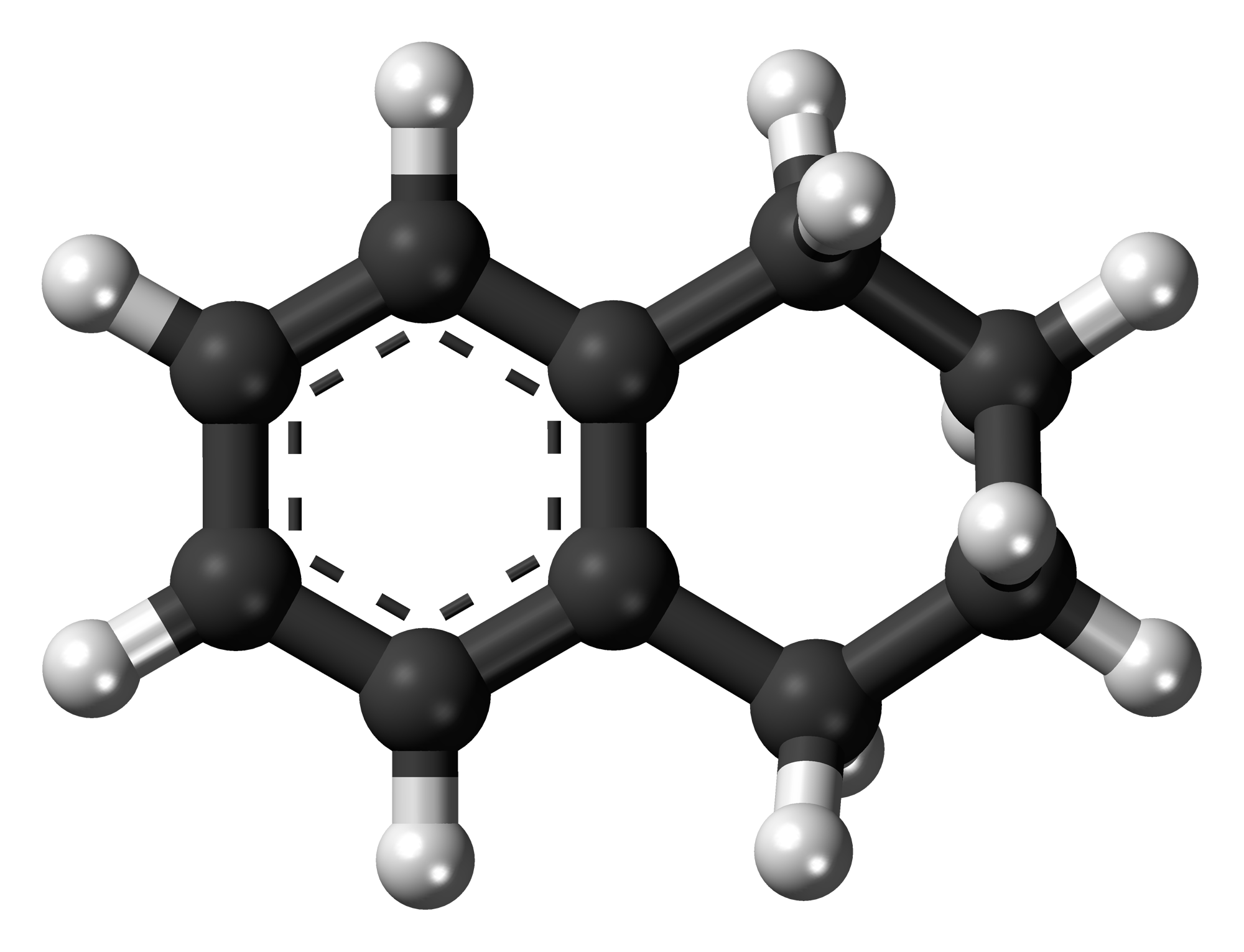

Names
- Preferred IUPAC name 1,2,3,4-Tetrahydronaphthalene
- Other names: 1,2,3,4-Tetrahydronaphthalene; Benzocyclohexane; NSC 77451; Tetrahydronaphthalene; Tetranap

Identifiers
CAS Number	119-64-2
3D model (JSmol)	Interactive image
ChEBI	CHEBI:35008
ChemSpider	8097
ECHA InfoCard	100.003.946
KEGG	C14114
PubChem CID	8404
UNII	FT6XMI58YQ
CompTox Dashboard (EPA)	DTXSID1026118
- InChI: InChI=1S/C10H12/c1-2-6-10-8-4-3-7-9(10)5-1/h1-2,5-6H,3-4,7-8H2 Key: CXWXQJXEFPUFDZ-UHFFFAOYSA-N; InChI=1/C10H12/c1-2-6-10-8-4-3-7-9(10)5-1/h1-2,5-6H,3-4,7-8H2 Key: CXWXQJXEFPUFDZ-UHFFFAOYAG
- SMILES: c1ccc2c(c1)CCCC2

Properties
Chemical formula	C_{10}H_{12}
Molar mass	132.206 g·mol^{−1}
Appearance	colorless liquid
Density	0.970 g/cm^{3}
Melting point	−35.8 °C (−32.4 °F; 237.3 K)
Boiling point	206 to 208 °C (403 to 406 °F; 479 to 481 K)
Solubility in water	Insoluble
Viscosity	2.02 cP at 25 °C

Hazards
- GHS labelling
Pictograms	(GHS07: Exclamation mark) (GHS09: Environmental hazard)
Signal word	Warning
Hazard statements	H315, H319, H411
Precautionary statements	P264, P264+P265, P273, P280, P302+P352, P305+P351+P338, P321, P332+P317, P337+P317, P362+P364, P391, P501
NFPA 704 (fire diamond)	1 2 0
Flash point	77 °C (171 °F; 350 K)
Autoignition temperature	385 °C (725 °F; 658 K)
Explosive limits	vol% in air: 0.8 (at 100 °C) - 5.0 (at 150 °C)
- Lethal dose or concentration (LD, LC)
LD_{50} (median dose)	2860 mg/kg (rat, oral)
- Except where otherwise noted, data are given for materials in their standard state (at 25 °C [77 °F], 100 kPa). verify (what is ?) Infobox references

Tetralin (1,2,3,4-tetrahydronaphthalene) is a hydrocarbon having the chemical formula C_{10}H_{12}. It is a partially hydrogenated derivative of naphthalene. It is a colorless liquid that is used as a hydrogen-donor solvent.

== Production ==
Tetralin is produced by the catalytic hydrogenation of naphthalene.

Although nickel catalysts are traditionally employed, many variations have been evaluated. Over-hydrogenation converts tetralin into decahydronaphthalene (decalin). Rarely encountered is dihydronaphthalene (dialin).

=== Laboratory methods ===
The Darzens tetralin synthesis, a name reaction discovered by Auguste Georges Darzens in 1926, involves production of tetralin derivatives by an intramolecular electrophilic aromatic substitution reaction of a 1-aryl-pent-4-ene using concentrated sulfuric acid,

== Uses ==
Tetralin is used as a hydrogen-donor solvent, for example in coal liquifaction. It functions as a source of H_{2}, which is transferred to the coal. The partially hydrogenated coal is more soluble.

It has been used in sodium-cooled fast reactors as a secondary coolant to keep sodium seals around pump impellers solidified; however its use has been superseded by NaK.

It is also used for the laboratory synthesis of hydrogen bromide:

C_{10}H_{12} + 4 Br_{2} → C_{10}H_{8}Br_{4} + 4 HBr

The facility of this reaction is in part a consequence of the moderated strength of the benzylic C-H bonds.

== Safety ==
Tetralin induces methemoglobinemia.
