= Li Yi =

Li Yi, Li-yi or Liyi may refer to:

- Li Yi (poet) (746/748–827/829), Tang dynasty poet
- Emperor Xuānzong of Tang (810–859), name Li Yi, Chinese emperor of the Tang Dynasty
- Hermengild Li Yi (1923–2012), Chinese Roman Catholic bishop
- Li Yi (sociologist) (born 1961), Chinese sociologist
- Li Yi (footballer) (born 1979), Chinese football player and coach
- Yi Li (basketball) (born 1987), Chinese basketball player
- Li Yi (wushu) (born 1992), Macau wushu practitioner
- Li Yi (voice actor) (1963–2013), Chinese voice actor and announcer
- Li Yi (composer), the Singapore film composer who worked on Homerun and I Not Stupid
- Liyi, a former country of the Fergana, a substate of Kangju
- Liyi, a set of Traditional Chinese law practices
- Liyi, a township in Shanxi, see List of township-level divisions of Shanxi
