= Ordos =

Ordos may refer to:

== Inner Mongolia ==
- Ordos City, Inner Mongolia, China
  - Ordos Ejin Horo Airport
- Ordos Loop of the Yellow River, a region of China
  - Ordos Plateau or "the Ordos", land enclosed by Ordos Loop
- Ordos Desert, in Inner Mongolia
- Ordos Mongols, a Mongol tribe that inhabits the Ordos region
- Ordos culture, prehistorical culture
- Ordos Mongolian, the variety of Mongolian spoken by the Ordos Mongols

== Other uses ==
- House Ordos, a fictional organisation in 'Dune' spin-offs
- Michal Ordoš (born 1983), Czech football player

== See also ==
- Ordo (disambiguation)
