= Heterogeneous catalytic reactor =

Chemical reactor

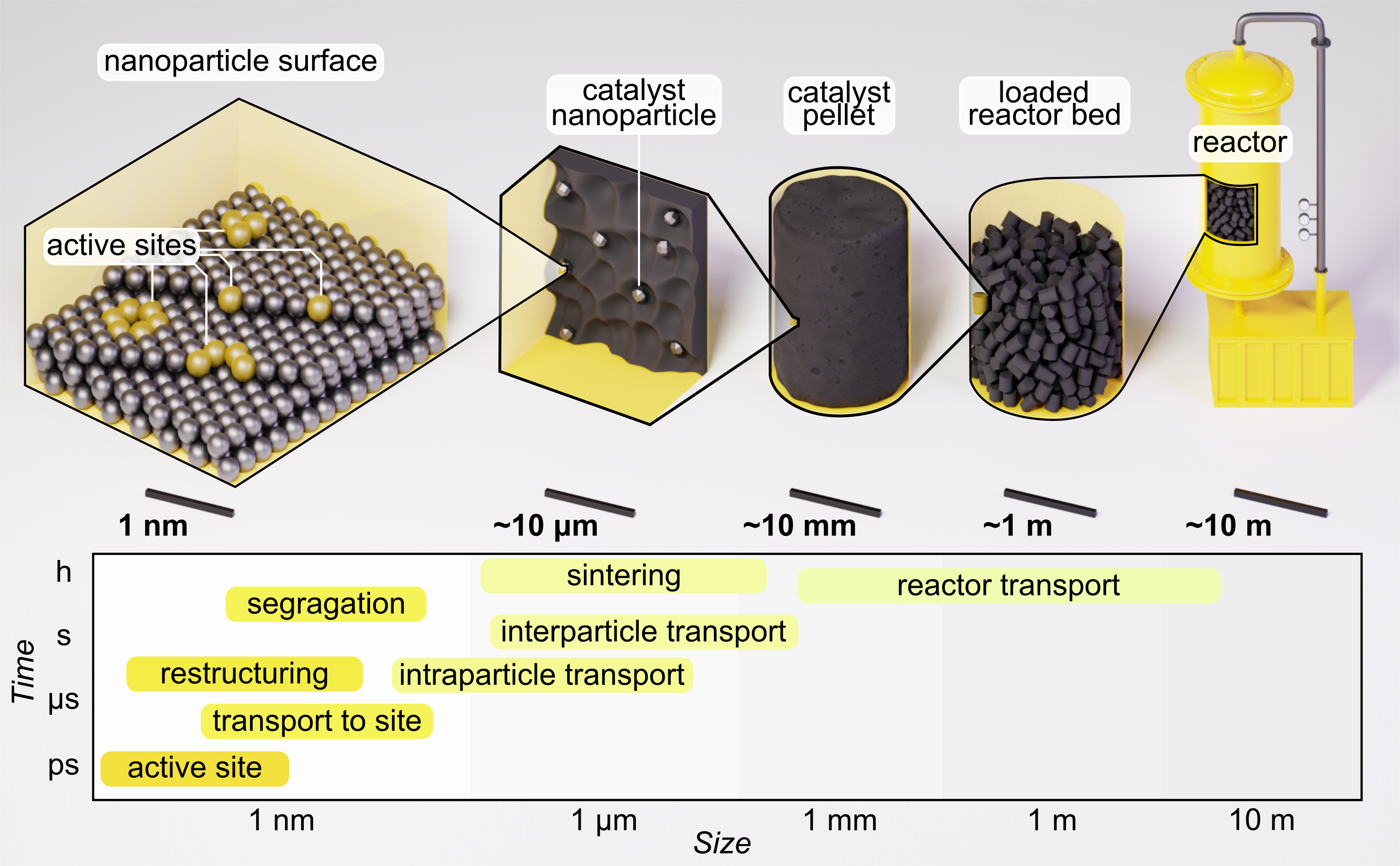
Heterogenous catalysis reactor

Heterogeneous catalytic reactors put emphasis on catalyst effectiveness factors and the heat and mass transfer implications. Heterogeneous catalytic reactors are among the most commonly utilized chemical reactors in the chemical engineering industry.

== Types of reactors ==
Heterogenous catalytic reactors are commonly classified by the relative motion of the catalyst particles.

=== Reactors with insignificant motion of catalyst particles ===
==== Fixed bed reactors ====
A fixed bed reactor is a cylindrical tube filled with catalyst pellets with reactants flowing through the bed and being converted into products. The catalyst may have multiple configuration including: one large bed, several horizontal beds, several parallel packed tubes, multiple beds in their own shells. The various configurations may be adapted depending on the need to maintain temperature control within the system. Serial connection of two reactors with option to dose oxidant between the stages enable under optimal conditions to increase the product yield in oxidation catalysis. By dosing intermediates or products between the stages, valuable information could be found concerning the reaction pathways.

The catalyst pellets may be spherical, cylindrical, or randomly shaped pellets. They range from 0.25 cm to 1.0 cm in diameter. The flow of a fixed bed reactor is typically downward. Packed bed reactor.

==== Trickle-bed reactors ====
A trickle-bed reactor is a fixed bed where liquid flows without filling the spaces between particles. Like with the fixed bed reactors, the liquid typically flows downward. At the same time, gas is flowing upward. The primary use for trickle-bed reactors is hydrotreatment reactions (hydrodesulfurization and hydrodemetalation of heavy crude oil, hydrodeasphaltenization of coal tar). This reactor is often utilized in order to handle feeds with extremely high boiling points.

==== Moving bed reactors ====
A moving bed reactor has a fluid phase that passes up through a packed bed. Solid is fed into the top of the reactor and moves down. It is removed at the bottom. Moving bed reactors require special control valves to maintain close control of the solids. For this reason, moving bed reactors are less frequently used than the above two reactors. Moving bed reactors are most suitable for solid content below 10% and is generally used where the solids (primarily catalyst) have high surface area due to its size in microns.

==== Rotating bed reactors ====
A rotating bed reactor (RBR) holds a packed bed fixed within a basket with a central hole. When the basket is spinning immersed in a fluid phase, the inertia forces created by the spinning motion forces the fluid outwards, thereby creating a circulating flow through the rotating packed bed. The rotating bed reactor is a rather new invention that shows high rates of mass transfer and good fluid mixing. RBR type reactors have frequently been applied in high-value biocatalysis reactions, there offering convenient reuse of immobilized enzymes while preventing mechanical damage of the solid-phase catalysts. RBR constructions are also emerging in the nuclear energy industry to purify liquid waste on the scale of 100's of cubic meters.

=== Reactors with significant motion of catalyst particles ===
==== Fluidized bed reactors ====
A fluidized bed reactor suspends small particles of catalyst by the upward motion of the fluid to be reacted. The fluid is typically a gas with a flow rate high enough to mix the particles without carrying them out of the reactor. The particles are much smaller than those for the above reactors. Typically on the scale of 10-300 microns. One key advantage of using a fluidized bed reactor is the ability to achieve a highly uniform temperature in the reactor. The fluidized bed reactors are best for bio-catalysts or enzymes doped on solids since the solid are fluidized by the working fluid and there is no mechanical impact on the solids.

==== Slurry reactors ====
A slurry reactor contains the catalyst in a powdered or granular form. This reactor is typically used when one reactant is a gas and the other a liquid while the catalyst is a solid. The reactant gas is put through the liquid and dissolved. It then diffuses onto the catalyst surface. Slurry reactors can use very fine particles and this can lead to problems of separation of catalyst from the liquid. Trickle-bed reactors don't have this problem and this is a big advantage of trickle-bed reactor. Unfortunately these large particles in trickle bed means much lower reaction rate. Overall, the trickle bed is simpler, the slurry reactors usually has a high reaction rate and the fluidized bed is somewhat in-between.
