= Laminar flow reactor =

Reaction using laminar dynamics

A laminar flow reactor (LFR) is a type of chemical reactor that uses laminar flow to control reaction rate, and/or reaction distribution. LFR is generally a long tube with constant diameter that is kept at constant temperature. Reactants are injected at one end and products are collected and monitored at the other. Laminar flow reactors are often used to study an isolated elementary reaction or multi-step reaction mechanism.

== Overview ==
Laminar flow reactors employ the characteristics of laminar flow to achieve various research purposes. For instance, LFRs can be used to study fluid dynamics in chemical reactions, or they can be utilized to generate special chemical structures such as carbon nanotubes. One feature of the LFR is that the residence time (The time interval during which the chemicals stay in the reactor) of the chemicals in the reactor can be varied by either changing the distance between the reactant input point and the point at which the product/sample is taken, or by adjusting the velocity of the gas/fluid. Therefore the benefit of a laminar flow reactor is that the different factors that may affect a reaction can be easily controlled and adjusted throughout an experiment.

== Means of analyzing reactants in LFR ==
Means of analyzing the reaction include using a probe that enters into the reactor; or more accurately, sometimes one can utilize non-intrusive optical methods (e.g. use spectrometer to identify and analyze contents) to study reactions in the reactor. Moreover, taking the entire sample of the gas/fluid at the end of the reactor and collecting data may be useful as well. Using methods mentioned above, various data such as concentration, flow velocity etc. can be monitored and analyzed.

== Flow velocity in LFR ==
Fluids or gases with controlled velocity pass through a laminar flow reactor in a fashion of laminar flow. That is, streams of fluids or gases slide over each other like cards. When analyzing fluids with the same viscosity ("thickness" or "stickiness") but different velocity, fluids are typically characterized into two types of flows: laminar flow and turbulent flow. Compared to turbulent flow, laminar flow tends to have a lower velocity and is generally at a lower Reynolds number. Turbulent flow, on the other hand, is irregular and travels at a higher speed. Therefore the flow velocity of a turbulent flow on one cross section is often assumed to be constant, or "flat". The "non-flat" flow velocity of laminar flow helps explain the mechanism of an LFR. For the fluid/gas moving in an LFR, the velocity near the center of the pipe is higher than the fluids near the wall of the pipe. Thus, the velocity distribution of the reactants tends to decrease from the center to the wall.

== Residence time distribution (RTD) ==
The velocity near the center of the pipe is higher than the fluids near the wall of the pipe. Thus, the velocity distribution of the reactants tends to be higher in the center and lower on the side. Consider fluid being pumped through an LFR at constant velocity from the inlet, and the concentration of the fluid is monitored at the outlet. The graph of the residence time distribution should look like a negative slope with positive concavity. And the graph is modeled by the function: $E(t)=0$ if $t$ is smaller than $\tau/2$; $E(t)=(\tau^2/2)t^3$ if $t$ is greater than or equal to $\tau/2$. Notice that the graph has the $E(t)$ value of zero initially, this is simply because it takes sometime for the substance to travel through the reactor. When the material is starting to reach the outlet, the concentration drastically increases, and it gradually decreases as time proceeds.

== Characteristics ==
The laminar flows inside of a LFR has the unique characteristic of flowing in a parallel fashion without disturbing one another. The velocity of the fluid or gas will naturally decrease as it gets closer to the wall and farther from the center. Therefore the reactants have an increasing residence time in the LFR from the center to the side. A gradually increasing residence time gives researchers a clear layout of the reaction at different times. Besides, when studying reactions in LFR, radial gradients in velocity, composition and temperature are significant. In other words, in other reactors where laminar flow is not significant, for instance, in a plug flow reactor, velocity of the object is assumed to be the same on one cross section since the flows are mostly turbulent. In a laminar flow reactor, velocity is significantly different at various points on the same cross section. Therefore the velocity differences throughout the reactor need to be taken into consideration when working with a LFR.

== Research ==
Various researches pertaining to the modeling of LFR and formations of substances within a LFR have been done over the past decades. For instance, the formation of Single-walled carbon nanotube was investigated in a LFR. As another example, conversion from methane to higher hydrocarbons have been studied in a laminar flow reactor.

== See also ==
- Chemical reactor
- Laminar flow
- Plug flow reactor model
- Turbulence
- Laminar vs. turbulent flow
