= Shanxi Lu'an Environmental Energy =

Chinese coal company

- Native name: 山西潞安环保能源
- Traded as: SSE: 601699
- Headquarters: Xiangyuan County, Changzhi, Shanxi, China

Shanxi Lu'an Environmental Energy (Chinese: 山西潞安环保能源; pinyin: Shānxī Lù'ān Huánbǎo Néngyuán) is a Chinese company engaged in the mining, processing, and distribution of coal. Chiefly, the company produces for sale coke and refined coal. The company is headquartered in Houbao, Xiangyuan County, Changzhi, Shanxi, and is listed on the Shanghai Stock Exchange.

== History ==
Shanxi Lu'an Environmental Energy was founded on July 19, 2001.

The company was listed on the Shanghai Stock exchange on September 22, 2006, as ticker 601699.

== October 2020 mine accident ==
On October 20, a gas explosion at a coal mine in Shanxi operated by Shanxi Lu'an Environmental Energy occurred, killing four people and injuring an additional person.
