= Li Yi (sociologist) =

Chinese sociologist

Li Yi Ph.D. (Chinese: 李毅; pinyin: Lǐ Yì, born 1961) is a sociologist. He is the author of several books and journal articles on sociology.

In 2019, Li was deported from Taiwan during a visit there.

== Controversies ==
- On 16 October 2020, he was invited to give a presentation at a forum in Shenzhen. During his talk, Li claimed that "The COVID-19 is most detrimental to the European and (North) American countries, whereas this pandemic is most beneficial to North Korea and China. We've got 4,000 people died because of it, right? But if you compare this with the 220,000 deaths in the U.S., (China's) 4,000 death toll is equivalent to no death at all, am I correct? (Laughter after his speech.) So, there was almost no infection or no death within our country. 4,000 deaths from 1.4 billion population, that's basically no death. Despite this (low infection and death rate in China), there are still so many of you wearing masks in this venue. (Longer laughter.)"
- Later in his speech, Li stated his personal opinions further, "Look at China. Currently, China's economy is the only one that is doing well in this world. China could overtake the U.S. ahead of time (that we've planned), there won't be an issue by the year 2027. The USA could not survive, the USA won't survive this. Now I have to say, none of you among all 1.4 billion Chinese people is capable of realizing that it is not the USA who is punishing China. It is us who are giving the Americans a hard time to live."

== Works ==
- -- (2005). The Structure and Evolution of Chinese Social Stratification. Lanham, MD: University Press of America. OCLC 62470986.
- -- (2005). The Structure and Evolution of China's Cadre System. Chicago, IL: University of Illinois at Chicago. OCLC 71438053.
- -- (2015). Selected Works of Li Yi, Volume 1: 《海外建言：中国复兴大战略》，2015. Beijing: Jiuzhou Press. OCLC 910946631.
- -- (2015). Selected Works of Li Yi, Volume 2: 《The Structure and Evolution of Chinese Social Stratification》，2015. Beijing: Jiuzhou Press. OCLC 921845534.
- -- (2011). 社会学概论 (An Introduction to Sociology). Guangzhou: Jinan University Press. OCLC 777816903.
- -- (2008). 中国社会分层的结构与演变 (The Structure and Evolution of Chinese Social Stratification). Hefei: Anhui University Press. OCLC 314019459.
- -- (1999). 社会学概论 (An Introduction to Sociology) (3 ed.). Xi'an: Shanxi Education Press. OCLC 64201799.
- -- (1993). 社会学概论 (An Introduction to Sociology) (2 ed.). Xi'an: Shanxi Education Press. OCLC 30814239.
- -- (1993). 马克思社会思想史纲 (The History of Marx's Social Thought). Beijing: Social Sciences Literature Press (Social Science Academic Press). OCLC 30825697.
- -- (1991). 社会学概论 (An Introduction to Sociology) (1 ed.). Xi'an: Shanxi Education Press. OCLC 44631445.

== See also ==
- Social class § Chinese model
