= Micromixing =

In pharmaceutics, micromixing is a process in which ingredient particles rearrange to form a blend. Development of pharmaceutical formulations requires understanding how the ingredients blend with each other and how the blending progresses through different stages. It is also important to establish in a scientific manner when the blending is considered complete, establishing the margins of blending performance, so that in production the blending is complete before the blending process stops.

== Optimal blending ==
In order to achieve optimal blending, the micromixing process must be studied to determine mixing parameters such as blending time, blending speed, type and size of blender. When blending is performed too long, overblending may occur, with particles re-aggregating, resulting in segregation of the previously ideal blend.

== Tools ==
Formulation scientists and technologists need tools to select ingredients for new formulations. Tablets contain multiple ingredients beyond the active pharmaceutical ingredients (API) such as fillers, tableting agents, disintegrants, and absorption enhancers or agents that slow down and control absorption. Choice of materials is important to assure the flow characteristics, potency, and absorption of specific formulations. In addition, proper particle size grades of the ingredients must be selected to produce an optimum blend for capsule filling.

== Methods ==
In order to study the rate and uniformity of blending, destructive analytical methods, such as dissolution followed by chromatographic separation and detection are often used. These methods require samples to be pulled from the blend, followed by time-consuming laboratory analysis. In production, such analysis delays may lengthen time required for production formulation development.

== Hyperspectral imaging ==
Near-infrared hyperspectral imaging can show the distribution of ingredients in pharmaceutical tablets. In addition to laboratory analysis, imaging of near line pull-samples has been used to indicate whether the mixing endpoint has been achieved. However, such measurements were performed once blending was completed, and therefore, did not yield information about the progression of micromixing during the blending process.
