= Inner Mongolia Yitai Coal Company =

Ordos City-based coal company

Inner Mongolia Yitai Coal Company Ltd
- Native name: 内蒙古伊泰煤炭股份有限公司
- Traded as: SSE: 900948
- Industry: Coal
- Founded: 1997
- Headquarters: Ordos City, Inner Mongolia, China
- Number of employees: 5,392 (2012)
- Parent: Inner Mongolia Yitai Group Co., Ltd
- Website: yitaicoal.com

The Inner Mongolia Yitai Coal Company is an Ordos City-based coal company founded in 1997. The company works in the mining, production, transport, and sale of coal and coal-based products in Inner Mongolia and China. It is a subsidiary of Inner Mongolia Yitai Group Co., Ltd. It has the seventh largest reserve of coal in the world measured by potential carbon emissions.
