= Ebullated bed reactor =

Type of fluidized-bed reactor

Ebullated bed reactors are a type of fluidized bed reactor that utilizes ebullition, or bubbling, to achieve appropriate distribution of reactants and catalysts. The ebullated-bed technology utilizes a three-phase reactor (liquid, vapor, and catalyst), and is most applicable for exothermic reactions and for feedstocks which are difficult to process in fixed-bed or plug flow reactors due to high levels of contaminants. Ebullated bed reactors offer high-quality, continuous mixing of liquid and catalyst particles. The advantages of a good back-mixed bed include excellent temperature control and, by reducing bed plugging and channeling, low and constant pressure drops. Therefore, ebullated bed reactors have the characteristics of stirred reactor type operation with a fluidized catalyst.

== Operation ==
The catalyst used for the ebullated bed is typically a 0.8-mm-diameter extrudate, and is held in a fluidized state through the upward lift of liquid reactants and gas. The liquid and gas enter in the reactor plenum, and are distributed across the bed through a distributor and grid plate. The height of the ebullated catalyst bed can be controlled by the rate of liquid recycle flow. This liquid rate is adjusted by varying the speed of the ebullating pump, a canned centrifugal pump which controls the flow of ebullating liquid obtained from the internal vapor/liquid separator inside the reactor. Fresh catalyst can be added, and spent catalyst withdrawn, to control the level of catalyst activity within the reactor. The capability of regular addition of a small quantity of catalyst is instrumental to ebullated-bed reactors' consistent product quality over long time periods. To adjust operation or different feedstocks, the type of catalyst used can also be changed without shutting down the reactor.

== Applications ==
Ebullated bed reactors are used in the hydroconversion of heavy petroleum and petroleum fractions, particularly vacuum residuum.

Ebullated beds have been developed for slurry hydrocracking of extra-heavy oil, tar sands, oil sands and liquefaction of coal through the use of ultrafine catalyst.

== See also ==
- Delayed coker – Oil refinery processing unit
