= Plug flow =

Simple model of fluid flow in a pipe

In fluid mechanics, plug flow is a simple model of the velocity profile of a fluid flowing in a pipe. In plug flow, the velocity of the fluid is assumed to be constant across any cross-section of the pipe perpendicular to the axis of the pipe. The plug flow model assumes there is no boundary layer adjacent to the inner wall of the pipe.

The plug flow model has many practical applications. One example is in the design of chemical reactors. Essentially no back mixing is assumed with "plugs" of fluid passing through the reactor. This results in differential equations that need to be integrated to find the reactor conversion and outlet temperatures. Other simplifications used are perfect radial mixing and a homogeneous bed structure.

An advantage of the plug flow model is that no part of the solution of the problem can be perpetuated "upstream". This allows one to calculate the exact solution to the differential equation knowing only the initial conditions. No further iteration is required. Each "plug" can be solved independently provided the previous plug's state is known.

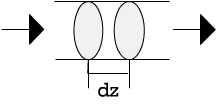

The flow model in which the velocity profile consists of the fully developed boundary layer is known as pipe flow. In laminar pipe flow, the velocity profile is parabolic.

== Determination ==
For flows in pipes, if flow is turbulent then the laminar sublayer caused by the pipe wall is so thin that it is negligible. Plug flow will be achieved if the sublayer thickness is much less than the pipe diameter ($\delta_s$<<D).

$$\delta_s = \frac {5 \nu} {u^*}$$
$$u^* = \left (\frac {\tau_w} {\rho} \right )^{1/2}$$
$\tau_w = \frac {D \Delta P} {4 L}$
$\frac {\Delta P} {L} = \frac {f \rho V^2} {2D}$
$${1 \over \sqrt{\mathit{f}}}= -2.0 \log_{10} \left(\frac{\epsilon/D}{3.7} + {\frac{2.51}{\text{Re} \sqrt{\mathit{f} } } } \right)  , \text{(turbulent flow)}$$

where $f$ is the Darcy friction factor (from the above equation or the Moody Chart), $\delta_s$ is the sublayer thickness, $D$ is the pipe diameter, $\rho$ is the density, $u^*$ is the friction velocity (not an actual velocity of the fluid), $V$ is the average velocity of the plug (in the pipe), $\tau_w$ is the shear on the wall, and $\Delta P$ is the pressure loss down the length $L$ of the pipe. $\epsilon$ is the relative roughness of the pipe. In this regime the pressure drop is a result of inertia-dominated turbulent shear stress rather than viscosity-dominated laminar shear stress.

== See also ==
- Hagen-Poiseuille flow
- Plug flow reactor model
