= Hydrogen-donor solvent =

Hydrocarbon that transfers hydrogen to substrates

A hydrogen-donor solvent is a hydrocarbon that transfers hydrogen to hydrogen-poor substrates, such as coal. The hydrogen-poor substrates could be solutes or suspensions. The classic hydrogen-donor solvent (or just donor solvent) is tetrahydronaphthalene, which converts to naphthalene by transfer of four hydrogens to the substrate. The enthalpy of hydrogenation of naphthalene is relatively low, which allows the tetrahydronaphthalene to be regenerated in the presence of high-pressure H_{2}. Catalysts are often used, such as molybdenum disulfide. Related hydrogen-donor solvents or solvent components are dihydrophenanthrene and tetrahydroquinoline.
