= Yili =

Yili (Wade-Giles: "I-li") may refer to:

- Etiquette and Rites, pinyin Yílǐ, one of the Confucian classics of Chinese literature
- Yili Group, a Chinese dairy company
- Ili River, in northwestern China and southeastern Kazakhstan
  - Ili Kazakh Autonomous Prefecture, in northernmost Xinjiang, China
  - Yili horse, a pony named for the region
