= Ordo =

Ordo (Latin "order, rank, class") may refer to:

- A musical phrase constructed from one or more statements of a rhythmic mode pattern and ending in a rest
- Big O notation in calculation of algorithm computational complexity
- Orda (organization), also ordo or horde, was a nomadic palace for the Mongol aristocrats and the Turkic rulers
- Order (biology), in the taxonomy of organisms
- Ordo Recitandi or directorium gives complete details of the celebration of the Eucharist and the Liturgy of the Hours, beginning with the first Sunday of Advent
- Religious order in monasticism
- The Inquisition from Warhammer 40,000 has three main ordines: Ordo Malleus, Ordo Hereticus and Ordo Xenos
- Ordo Templi Orientis, an organization dedicated to the religious philosophy of Thelema
- The scholarly economic/political science journal The ORDO Yearbook of Economic and Social Order
- Canderous Ordo, a fictional character in the Star Wars video games Star Wars: Knights of the Old Republic and Star Wars Knights of the Old Republic II: The Sith Lords
- A fictional encryption program from the book Cryptonomicon, by Neal Stephenson
- Novus ordo seclorum which appears on the reverse of the Great Seal of the United States
- Ordo Missae or Order of Mass, the order (regulation) of the Eucharist in the Roman Rite of the Catholic Church
- Ordo (military unit), a Roman military unit, originally a maniple, at the Imperial times, the centuria

== See also ==
- Urdu
