= Perfect mixing =

Perfect mixing is a term heavily used in relation to the definition of models that predict the behavior of chemical reactors.

Perfect mixing assumes that there are no spatial gradients in a given physical envelope, such as:

- concentration (with respect to any chemical species)
- temperature
- chemical potential
- catalytic activity

== See also ==
- Mathematical Modeling of the Dynamics of Homogeneous Reactions in the Cascade of Perfect Mixing Reactors (PDF)
