= Synthetic fuels in the United States =

In the United States, synthetic fuels are of increasing importance due to the price of crude oil, and geopolitical and economic considerations.

== History ==
Synthetic production of liquid fuels (i.e., gasoline and oil substitutes) in the United States has a long history. In the 19th century, dozens facilities produced oil, gas, grease and paraffin from coal, but by 1873, cheap petroleum caused the last coal oil plant to close. The commercial scale shale oil extraction began in 1857 at shale oil retorts retorting the Devonian oil shale along the Ohio River Valley. However, after crude oil discovery in Pennsylvania in 1859, oil shale industries found it difficult to compete and they were shut down by 1861.

The oil shale industry expanded immediately before World War I because of limited access to conventional petroleum resources and the mass production of automobiles and trucks, which accompanied an increase in gasoline consumption. The Office of Naval Petroleum and Oil Shale Reserves was established in 1912. The reserves were seen as a possible emergency source of fuel for the military, particularly the Navy.

The United States Bureau of Mines first studied the extraction of oil from oil shale between 1925 - 1928. Between 1928 and 1944, the Bureau experimented with coal liquefaction by hydrogenation using the Bergius process. A small-scale test unit constructed in 1937 had a 100-pound per day continuous coal feed. The methodologies employed underwent extensive development in this period, delivering significant increases in efficiency, culminating in the Karrick process.

The Synthetic Liquid Fuels Act approved on April 5, 1944, authorized the use of $30 million over a five-year period. Between 1945 and 1948, new laboratories were constructed near Pittsburgh. A synthetic ammonia plant Louisiana, Missouri (Missouri Ordnance Works) was transferred from the Army to the program in 1945. The plant was converted into a coal hydrogenation test facility. By 1949 the plant could produce 200 barrels (32 m^{3}) of oil a day using the Bergius process. Part of the personnel were German scientists, who had been extracted from Germany by Operation Paperclip.

In 1948, the program was extended to eight years and funding increased to $60 million. A second facility was constructed at the Louisiana plant, this time using the Fischer–Tropsch process. Completed in 1951, the plant only produced 40,000 US gallons (150 m^{3}) of fuel. In 1953 the new Republican-led House Appropriations Committee ended funding for the research and the Missouri plant was returned to the Department of the Army.

The United States Bureau of Mines opened a demonstration oil shale mine at Anvils Point, west of Rifle, Colorado, which operated at a small scale. In the early 1960s TOSCO (The Oil Shale Corporation) opened an underground mine and built an experimental plant near Parachute, Colorado. It was closed in 1972 because the price of production exceeded the cost of imported crude oil. In 1951, the United States Department of Defense became interested in oil shale as an alternative resource for producing a jet fuel.

Due to the 1973 oil crisis, the Navy and the Office of Naval Petroleum and Oil Shale Reserves started evaluations of oil shale's suitability for military fuels, such as jet fuels, marine fuels and a heavy fuel oil. Shale-oil based JP-4 jet fuel was produced until the early 1990s, when it was replaced with kerosene-based JP-8. In 1974 the United States Department of the Interior announced an oil shale leasing program in the oil shale regions of Colorado and Utah. In 1979, after the second oil crisis, the U.S. Congress approved the Energy Security Act forming the Synthetic Fuels Corporation and authorized up to $88 million for synthetic fuels projects. The U.S. Department of Energy also formed its Synthetic Fuels Program, which promoted large-scale oil shale development and was involved in the prototype lease tracks in the Piceance Basin of Rio Blanco Country, Colorado. In 1980, it was allotted a $2.616 billion budget for three synthetic fuel projects.

The United States synthetic fuels industry collapsed when oil prices fell in the early 1980s. On 2 May 1982, known as "Black Sunday", Exxon canceled its US$5 billion Colony Shale Oil Project near Parachute, Colorado because of low oil-prices and increased expenses, laying off more than 2,000 workers and leaving a trail of home-foreclosures and small-business bankruptcies. In 1986, President Ronald Reagan signed into law the Consolidated Omnibus Budget Reconciliation Act of 1985 which among other things abolished the United States' Synthetic Liquid Fuels Program. New synthetic fuel projects started in 2000s (decade) due to the crude oil prices, and geopolitical and economic considerations.

== Coal reserves ==
The United States has 26% of Earth's known coal reserves. This is sufficient to last hundreds of years by the lowest estimates and accounts for 90% of U.S. energy reserves. Coal is a fossil fuel and as such is therefore subject to possible depletion within a few hundred years. In terms of energy obtained, coal peaked in 1998 and though production volumes have increased, the net energy has not, which could be explained by decreasing production of high quality coal, such as bituminous and anthracite. U.S. reserves are approximately 45% bituminous and anthracite.

The energy value of all the world's known recoverable coal is 27 zettajoules, which is expected to last 164 years. (See "Coal")

Of that, U.S. reserves alone comprise 7.02 zettajoules. The U.S. DOE estimates coal reserves at 1,081,279 million short tons (9.81 × 1014 kg), or about 4,786 billion (4.7 trillion) barrels of oil equivalent. The amount of coal burned during 2001 was calculated as 2.337 gigatonnes of oil equivalent, or about 46 million barrels (7,300,000 m^{3}) of oil equivalent per day. Were consumption to continue at that rate, those reserves would last about 285 years.

Production of synthetic fuels from U.S. coal assets represents an effective means towards decreasing U.S. reliance on imported oil, reducing trade deficits and providing more economical energy than current markets offer. (See "Princeton University: Increased Automobile Fuel Efficiency and Synthetic Fuels; Alternatives for Reducing Oil Imports" below)

== Economic viability ==
Oils, including petroleum, have long been extracted from coal. Production plants were merely shut down in the 1880s because crude oil became cheaper than coal liquefaction. The capability itself, however, has never disappeared. Eight years of pilot plant tests by Karrick attest that states, cities or even smaller towns, could make their own gas and generate their own electricity.

John Winslow, Laboratories Technology Manager for Coal Fuels at the U.S. DOE National Energy Technology Laboratory (NETL), estimates that a plant producing 30,000 barrels (4,800 m^{3}) of liquid coal per day (4,800 m³/d) can keep costs to $35–$40 per barrel. This finding was presented at the Coal Utilization Technologies Workshop, September 22, 2004, at the National Research Center for Coal & Energy, Morgantown, WV. This meeting was part of the Energy Roadmap Workshop Series commissioned by West Virginia Governor Bob Wise.

Potential market size is substantial, U.S. importation of petroleum products alone for 2005 being $251.6 Billion, $302.5 Billion for 2006, $331.2 Billion for 2007 and $386.3 Billion for 2008, all records, for a 4-year total of $1.27 Trillion. (See "U.S. Census Bureau 2008 Foreign Trade Statistics" below).

== Proposed projects ==
In the United States, a number of different synthetic fuels projects are moving forward, with the first expected to enter commercial operation starting in 2013.

American Clean Coal Fuels, in their Illinois Clean Fuels project, is developing a 30,000-barrel (4,800 m^{3}) per day biomass and coal to liquids + carbon capture and sequestration project in Oakland Illinois. The project is expected to come online in 2013.

Baard Energy, in their Ohio River Clean Fuels project, are developing a 53,000 bbl/d (8,400 m^{3}/d) Coal and Biomass to Liquids project + Carbon Capture and Sequestration.

DKRW is planning a 15,000-20,000-barrel (3,200 m^{3}) Per Day coal to liquids + Carbon Capture and Sequestration plant in Medicine Bow Wyoming. As of March 2013, the project has still not completed financing for its proposed $2 billion plant.

== Abandoned projects ==
Rentech was developing a 29,600-barrel (4,710 m^{3}) per day coal and biomass to liquids + Carbon Capture and Sequestration plant in Natchez Mississippi. The project is now abandoned, and the company does not plan any independent energy project development.

== Initial consumers ==
In the United States, the aviation community has taken a leadership role in establishing a major US market for synthetic fuel. In addition to their certification efforts, the United States Air Force has publicly stated their intention to fuel half of their domestic US flights with synthetic fuel by 2016. The commercial aviation industry, working with potential suppliers via CAAFI, is also pushing hard to secure sources of fuel. In 2008, the U.S. Department of Defense was also permitted to engage in a multiyear contract for the procurement of synthetic fuel. In Chapter 141 of title 10 of the United States Code, the head of the agency was authorized to purchase synthetic fuels for a period that does not exceed 25 years. Substantial interest has also been shown from municipal and commercial vehicle fleet operations, railroads, and even refiners looking to use synthetic fuels as blendstock.

The United States Department of Energy projects that domestic consumption of synthetic fuel made from coal and natural gas will rise to 3.7 million barrels (590,000 m^{3}) per day in 2030 based on a price of $57 per barrel of high sulfur crude (Annual Energy Outlook 2006, Table 14, pg52). Early surveys such as those conducted by the American National Standards Institute (ANSI) in the 1980s for the purpose of establishing a technical framework for synthetic fuel gas turbine applications, respondents indicated plans for the future adoption of this type of fuel. This is demonstrated today in the increasing use of coal gasification particularly in commercial operations such as the Texaco gasifiers at Kingsport, Tennessee, which produces synthetic gas for the production of methanol and other chemicals used in gas-turbine-based power generation.

== Non-transportation "synfuel" ==
Numerous US companies (TECO, Progress Energy, DTE, Marriott) have also taken advantage of coal-based synfuel tax credits established in the 1970s, however many of the products qualifying for the subsidy are not true synthetic fuels.

The coal industry currently uses the credit to increase profits on coal-burning powerplants by introducing a "pre-treatment" process that satisfies the technical requirements, then burns the result the same as it would burn coal. Sometimes the amount gained in the tax credit is a major factor in the economic operation of the plant. The synfuel tax credit has been used primarily in this manner since the cheap gas prices of the 1980s stopped any major efforts to create a transportation fuel with the credit, and its continuation is seen as a major "pork project" win for coal industry lobbyists, costing $9 billion per annum. The total production of such synfuels in the US was an estimated 73 million tons in 2002.
