= Karrick process =

Low temperature carbonization and pyrolysis process

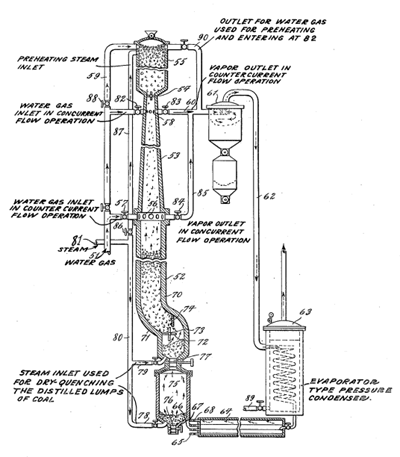
Karrick Process, from U.S. Patent #1,958,918

The Karrick process is a low-temperature carbonization (LTC) and pyrolysis process of carbonaceous materials. Although primarily meant for coal carbonization, it also could be used for processing of oil shale, lignite or any carbonaceous materials. These are heated at 450 °C (800 °F) to 700 °C (1,300 °F) in the absence of air to distill out synthetic fuels–unconventional oil and syngas. It could be used for a coal liquefaction as also for a semi-coke production. The process was the work of oil shale technologist Lewis Cass Karrick at the United States Bureau of Mines in the 1920s.

== History ==
The Karrick process was invented by Lewis Cass Karrick in the 1920s. Although Karrick did not invent coal LTC as such, he perfected the existing technologies resulting the Karrick process. The retort used for the Karrick process based on the Nevada–Texas–Utah Retort, used for the shale oil extraction.

In 1935, a Karrick LTC pilot plant was constructed in the coal research laboratory at the University of Utah. Commercial-size processing plants were operated during the 1930s in Colorado, Utah and Ohio. During World War II, similar processing plant was operated by the United States Navy. In Australia, during World War II the Karrick process plants were used for shale oil extraction in New South Wales. In 1950s–1970s, the technology was used by the Rexco Company in its Snibston plant at Coalville in Leicestershire, England.

== Process ==
The Karrick process is a low-temperature carbonization process, which uses a hermetic retort. For commercial scale production, a retort about 3 feet (0.91 m) in diameter and 20 feet (6.1 m) high would be used. The process of carbonization would last about 3 hours.

Superheated steam is injected continuously into the top of a retort filled by coal. At first, in contact with cool coal, the steam condenses to water acting as a cleaning agent. While temperature of coal rises, the destructive distillation starts. Coal is heated at 450 °C (800 °F) to 700 °C (1,300 °F) in the absence of air. The carbonization temperature is lower compared with 800 °C (1,500 °F) to 1,000 °C (1,800 °F) for producing metallurgic coke. The lower temperature optimizes the production of coal tars richer in lighter hydrocarbons than normal coal tar, and therefore it is suitable for processing into fuels. Resulting water, oil and coal tar, and syngas moves out from retort through outlet valves at the bottom of the retort. The residue (char or semi-coke) remains in the retort. While the produced liquids are mostly a by-product, the semi-coke is the main product, a solid and smokeless fuel.

The Karrick LTC process generates no carbon dioxide, but it does produce a significant amount of carbon monoxide.

== Products ==
In the Karrick process, 1 short ton of coal yields up to 1 barrel of oils and coal tars (12% by weight), and produces 3,000 cubic feet (85 m^{3}) of rich coal gas and 1,500 pounds (680 kg) of solid smokeless char or semi-coke (for one metric ton, 0.175 m^{3} of oils and coal tars, 95 m^{3} of gas, and 750 kg of semi-coke). Yields by volume of approximately 25% gasoline, 10% kerosene and 20% good quality fuel oil are obtainable from coal. Gasoline obtained from coal by the Karrick process combined with cracking and refining is equal in quality to tetraethyl lead gasolines. More power is developed in internal combustion engines and an increase in fuel economy of approximately 20% is obtainable under identical operating conditions.

Semi-coke can be used for utility boilers and coking coal in steel smelters, yields more heat than raw coal and can be converted to water gas. Water gas can be converted to oil by the Fischer–Tropsch process. Coal gas from Karrick LTC yields greater energy content than natural gas. Phenolic wastes are used by the chemical industry as feedstock for plastics, etc. Electrical power can be cogenerated at nominal equipment cost.

== Economic viability ==
Oils, including petroleum, have long been extracted from coal. Production plants were merely shut down in the 1880s because crude oil became cheaper than coal liquefaction. The capability itself, however, has never disappeared. Eight years of pilot plant tests by Karrick attest that states, cities or even smaller towns, could make their own gas and generate their own electricity.

A 30-ton plant and oil refinery will show a profit over and above all operating and capital costs and the products will sell at attractive prices for equivalent products. The private sector should require no subsidies, but not in competition with those who skim off the oil from coal and sell the residual smokeless fuel to power plants.

The cheapest liquid fuel from coal will come when processed by LTC for both liquid fuels and electric power. As a tertiary product of the coal distilling process, electrical energy can be generated at a minimum equipment cost. A Karrick LTC plant with 1 kiloton of daily coal capacity produces sufficient steam to generate 100,000 kilowatt hours of electrical power at no extra cost excepting capital investment for electrical equipment and loss of steam temperature passing through turbines. The process steam cost could be low since this steam could be derived from off-peak boiler capacity or from turbines in central electric stations. Fuel for steam and superheating would subsequently be reduced in cost.

== Advantages and disadvantages ==
Compared to the Bergius process, the Karrick process is cheaper, requires less water and destroys less the thermal value (one-half that of the Bergius process). The smokeless semi-coke fuel, when burned in an open grate or in boilers, delivers 20% to 25% more heat than raw coal. The coal gas should deliver more heat than natural gas per heat unit contained due to the greater quantity of combined carbon and lower dilution of the combustion gases with water vapor.

== See also ==
- Coal oil
- Carbon sequestration
- CO2 sequestration
- Carbon capture and storage
- Major coal producing regions
- Pyrolysis oil
- Synthetic Liquid Fuels Program
- Synthetic fuels in the United States
- Synthetic oil
