= 1984 Pennsylvania Auditor General election =

- November 6, 1984
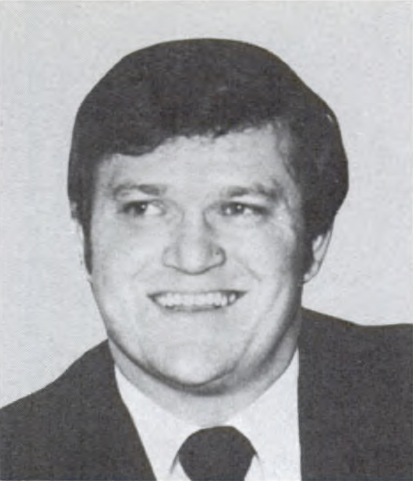

Nominee	Don Bailey	Susan M. Shanaman
Party	Democratic	Republican
Popular vote	2,289,308	2,136,677
Percentage	50.97%	47.58%
Auditor General before election
Al Benedict
Democratic
Elected Auditor General
Don Bailey
Democratic

The 1984 Pennsylvania Auditor General election took place on November 6, 1984, to elect the Pennsylvania Auditor General. Incumbent Democratic Auditor Al Benedict was ineligible to seek a third term in office and instead ran for State Treasurer.

Democratic nominee and former U.S. Representative Don Bailey managed to beat Republican nominee and former Pennsylvania Public Utility Commission chairwoman Susan M. Shanaman, 51.0% to 47.6%. Bailey was the only Democratic nominee to win statewide that year.

== Republican primary ==
=== Candidates ===
==== Nominee ====
- Susan M. Shanaman, former chairwoman of the Pennsylvania Public Utility Commission.

==== Eliminated in primary ====
- Tom Swift, Member of the Pennsylvania House of Representatives from the 6th district.
- Eleanor Jeane Thomas, retired book keeper and perennial candidate from Somerset County.

==== Withdrew after Republican State Committee convention ====
- Robert A. Rovner, former State Senator.

=== Results ===
April 10, 1984 Republican primary
Party	Candidate	Votes	%
Republican	Susan M. Shanaman	329,384	52.25%
Republican	Tom Swift	173,881	27.58%
Republican	Eleanor J. Thomas	127,179	20.17%
Total votes		630,444	100.00%

== Democratic primary ==
=== Candidates ===
==== Nominee ====
- Don Bailey, former member of the U.S. House of Representatives from Pennsylvania's 21st congressional district.

==== Eliminated in primary ====
- Frank Lucchino, Allegheny County controller.

=== Results ===
April 10, 1984 Democratic primary
Party	Candidate	Votes	%
Democratic	Don Bailey	593,722	55.24%
Democratic	Frank Lucchino	481,004	44.76%
Total votes		1,074,726	100.00%

== General election ==
=== Results ===
1984 Pennsylvania Auditor General election
Party	Candidate	Votes	%
Democratic	Don Bailey	2,289,308	50.97%
Republican	Susan M. Shanaman	2,136,677	47.58%
Consumer	Lance S. Haver	39,041	0.87%
Libertarian	David K. Walter	25,883	0.58%
Total votes		4,490,909	100.00%
Democratic hold			
