= Donald A. Bailey =

American lawyer and politician (1945–2020)

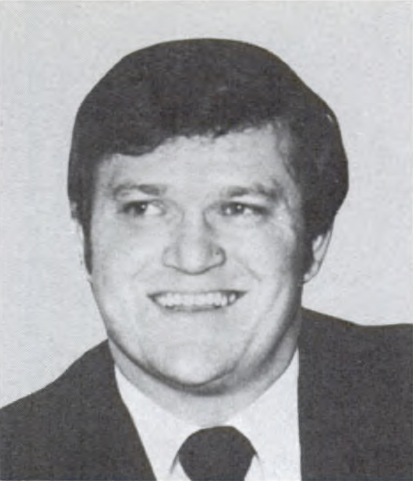
- Bailey in 1979

45th Auditor General of Pennsylvania
- In office January 15, 1985 – January 17, 1989
- Governor: Dick Thornburgh; Bob Casey Sr.
- Preceded by: Al Benedict
- Succeeded by: Barbara Hafer

Member of the U.S. House of Representatives from Pennsylvania's 21st district
- In office January 3, 1979 – January 3, 1983
- Preceded by: John Dent
- Succeeded by: Tom Ridge

Personal details
- Born: Donald Allen Bailey; July 21, 1945 Pittsburgh, Pennsylvania, U.S.
- Died: March 9, 2020 (aged 74) Harrisburg, Pennsylvania, U.S.
- Party: Democratic
- Education: University of Michigan (BA); Duquesne University (JD)

Military service
- Allegiance: United States of America
- Branch/service: United States Army
- Rank: First lieutenant
- Battles/wars: Vietnam War
- Awards: Silver Star; Bronze Star; Army Commendation Medal

Donald Allen Bailey (July 21, 1945 – March 9, 2020) was an American lawyer and politician from Pennsylvania. He was a Democratic member of the United States House of Representatives from 1979 to 1983, Auditor General of Pennsylvania from 1985 to 1989, and a candidate for the Democratic nomination for United States Senate and Governor of Pennsylvania. His Congressional District (PA-21) included all of Westmoreland County, Pennsylvania with a sliver of Allegheny County, Pennsylvania, prior to the 1981 redistricting.

== Early life, education, and early career ==
Bailey was born in Allegheny County to Glenn and Anna Bailey. He was raised in Allegheny and Westmoreland counties. He graduated from Greensburg High School in 1963. He completed a BA (1967) at the University of Michigan. He played college football at the guard position for the Michigan Wolverines football team from 1964 to 1966. He played in the 1965 Rose Bowl and North/South All Star Game.

After college, he entered the United States Army, serving with the 82nd and 101st Airborne Divisions in Vietnam. He was awarded the Silver Star, three Bronze Stars (two with the Valor device and one for meritorious achievement), Army Commendation Medal, with "V" for Valor, Air Medal, and a second Army Commendation Medal for meritorious service.

After Vietnam, Bailey worked at a number of blue-collar jobs, including as a steelworker at J. & L. Steel Corp., during which time he was a member of the United Steelworkers of America. He completed a JD (1976, on the G.I. Bill) at Duquesne University School of Law, and was shortly thereafter admitted to the Pennsylvania bar.

== U.S. House of Representatives (1979–1983) ==
=== Elections ===
Upon the retirement announcement in 1978 of Democrat John Dent of Pennsylvania's 21st congressional district, Bailey would successfully win the party nomination in a field of 11 candidates with a 23& plurality. Success at the general election followed with 53% of the vote.

He sailed past his two challengers at the 1980 April primary election with 60% of the vote. The first term incumbent was returned to Congress at the November general election with 68% of the vote.

The district in the 1982 election was one of two state districts that would be eliminated following reapportionment by the State Legislature and "slow-growth" effects. Much of the district, including the Bailey home in Westmoreland County, was merged with the 12th District of fellow Democratic Congressman John Murtha, serving since 1974. Bailey was unable to persevere at the party nomination with Murtha receiving 52% of the party vote.

=== Tenure ===
He was generally considered as a moderate-to-conservative Democrat. In 1979, he sponsored legislation to fund domestic synthetic fuel production. Yet he frequently criticized President Jimmy Carter. When challenged by the liberal U.S. Senator Ted Kennedy, Bailey and Western Pennsylvania Democrats would endorsed Carter. Bailey said "Carter is still the best alternative."

He negotiated for loans for the Wheeling-Pittsburgh Steel company. In 1981, he opposed raising the retirement age. He also voted against spending cuts proposed by Republican President Ronald Reagan and against a Balanced budget amendment.

=== Committee assignments ===
- United States House Committee on Ways and Means
- United States House Committee on Education and Labor
- United States House Ethics Committee
- United States House Committee on Armed Services

== Auditor General of Pennsylvania (1985–1989) ==
In 1984, Bailey was the Democratic Party nominee for Pennsylvania Auditor General that defeated Republican Susan Shanaman 51%–48%. He had the distinction that year to be the only Democratic statewide office nominee to win. During his tenure as Auditor General, Bailey established the first work-site child daycare facility in Pennsylvania government, established minimum education standards for state auditors, and generally modernized auditing procedures.

== Legal career (1989–2013) ==
After leaving the Auditor General office in 1989, Bailey became a full-time attorney, based in Harrisburg, Pennsylvania with a practice specialty thaT included civil rights. He would characterize himself, as an "equal opportunity suer Lawyers Weekly USA: LOTY" and does take clients litigating with both Democrats and Republicans. On October 2, 2013, the Supreme Court of Pennsylvania suspended Bailey from practice for 5 years for professional misconduct, including accusing lower-case judges of conspiring against him.

== Political campaigns since 1986 ==
=== 1986 U.S. Senate election ===
Bailey sought in 1986 to unseat incumbent Republican U.S. Senator Arlen Specter but failed to gain party support at the primary election that went to the U.S. Congressman Bob Edgar 47%–45%.

=== 1988 Auditor General election ===
Bailey unsuccessfully defended his tenure in 1988, losing to Republican Barbara Hafer, an Allegheny County Commissioner, 49%–48% (difference of 35,618 votes).

=== 1992 Auditor General election ===
Bailey would attempt to unseat his successor but party challenger State Senator H. Craig Lewis received a plurality of 40% of the party vote: businessman Jack O'Brien ranked second with 27%, Bailey ranked third with 20%, and State Senator Roy Afflerbach with 12%.

=== 1998 gubernatorial election ===
In 1998, Bailey south as his next target incumbent Republican Governor Tom Ridge. Bailey lost the Democratic primary to State Representative Ivan Itkin 49%–39%.

=== 2012 attorney general election ===
After a 14 year hiatus, Bailey ditched the Democratic Party and ran unsuccessfully as an independent for Pennsylvania Attorney General as an independent.

== Death ==
Bailey died on March 9, 2020, at age 74.

== Notes ==
Much of the information is taken from the Congressional Biography website and the offline Pennsylvania Manual, volumes 105 (1981) and 108 (1987).

U.S. House of Representatives
Preceded by John Dent	Member of the U.S. House of Representatives from Pennsylvania's 21st congressional district 1979–1983	Succeeded by Tom Ridge
Political offices
Preceded by Al Benedict	Auditor General of Pennsylvania; 1985–1989	Succeeded by Barbara Hafer
Party political offices
Preceded by Al Benedict	Democratic nominee for Auditor General of Pennsylvania; 1984, 1988	Succeeded by Craig Lewis
