= H. Craig Lewis =

American politician

Craig Lewis

Member of the Pennsylvania Senate from the 6th district
- In office January 7, 1975 – November 30, 1994
- Preceded by: Robert Rovner
- Succeeded by: Tommy Tomlinson

Personal details
- Born: July 22, 1944 Hazleton, Pennsylvania, United States
- Died: January 13, 2013 (aged 68) Anegada, British Virgin Islands

Harold Craig Lewis (July 22, 1944 – January 13, 2013) was an American politician from Pennsylvania who served as a Democratic member of the Pennsylvania State Senate for the 6th district from 1975 to 1994. Lewis was chair of the Judiciary, Local Government, and Ethics Committees throughout his Senate career. He served on numerous state commissions and he was the minority leader of the Appropriations Committee until 1984.

== Early life and education ==
Lewis was born in Hazleton, Pennsylvania, Lewis graduated from Millersville University of Pennsylvania, attended the University of Nebraska graduate school and received his law degree from Temple University.

== Career ==
In 1980, Lewis lost a primary bid for the U.S. Senate. In 1992, he lost a bid to unseat Republican Auditor General Barbara Hafer.

He practiced law as a partner in the Dechert, Price & Rhodes law firm and served as a member of the Bar of the Supreme Court of Pennsylvania, the Pennsylvania Intergovernmental Council, and the state Advisory Committee for Guidance Service. After leaving the Senate, Sen. Lewis served as a vice president for corporate affairs at Norfolk Southern Corp. In 1998, he was named chair of the Philadelphia Foundation, which at that time awarded the Philadelphia Liberty Medal. He also was on the board of Aria Health, which operates three hospitals in the Philadelphia region, and the Philadelphia Zoo.

He died of a heart attack in Loblolly Bay on a vacation to the British Virgin Islands in 2013. At the time of his death he resided in Philadelphia, Pennsylvania. He is buried immediately next to Harry Kalas at Laurel Hill Cemetery in Philadelphia.

== Personal life ==
In 1984 he married Dianne Semingson, a Philadelphia business director who served in the Wilson Goode administration as a city representative.

== Legacy ==
In 2013, Norfolk Southern Railway renamed the Dillerville Yard in Lancaster, Pennsylvania in honor of Lewis.

Pennsylvania State Senate
Preceded by Robert Rovner	Member of the Pennsylvania Senate for the 6th District; 1975–1994	Succeeded by Tommy Tomlinson
Party political offices
Preceded by Don Bailey	Democratic nominee for Auditor General of Pennsylvania; 1992	Succeeded by Bob Casey, Jr.
