= Bergius process =

Method to produce liquid hydrocarbons as fuel

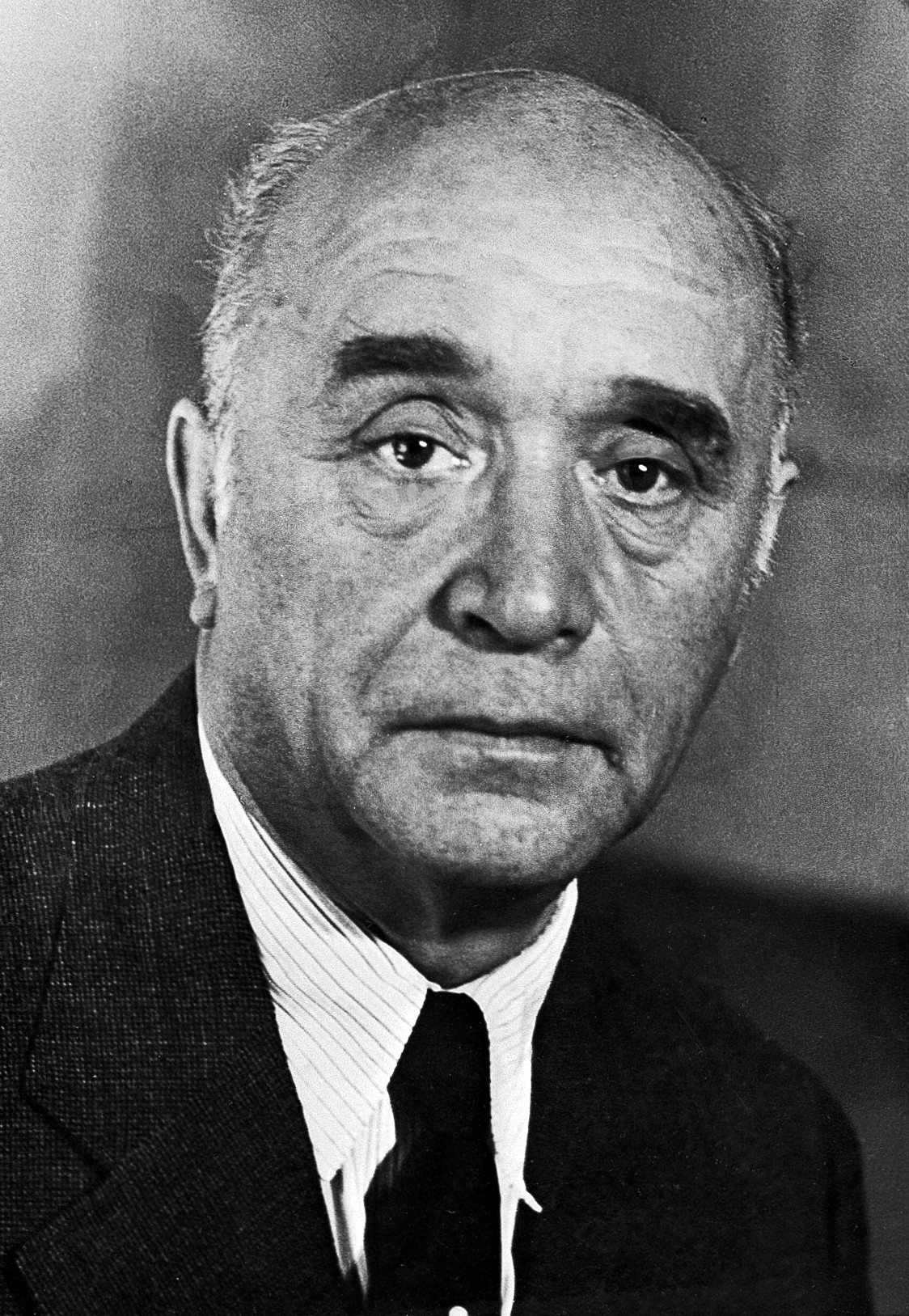
Friedrich Bergius

The Bergius process is a method of production of liquid hydrocarbons for use as synthetic fuel by hydrogenation of high-volatile bituminous coal at high temperature and pressure. It was first developed by Friedrich Bergius in 1913. In 1931 Bergius was awarded the Nobel Prize in Chemistry for his development of high-pressure chemistry.

== History ==
Friedrich Bergius developed the process during his habilitation. A technique for the high-pressure and high-temperature chemistry of carbon-containing substrates yielded in a patent in 1913. In this process liquid hydrocarbons used as synthetic fuel are produced by hydrogenation of lignite (brown coal). He developed the process well before the commonly known Fischer–Tropsch process. Karl Goldschmidt invited him to build an industrial plant at his factory the Th. Goldschmidt AG (now known as Evonik Industries) in 1914. The production began only in 1919, after World War I ended, when the need for fuel was already declining. The technical problems, inflation and the constant criticism of Franz Joseph Emil Fischer, which changed to support after a personal demonstration of the process, made the progress slow, and Bergius sold his patent to BASF, where Carl Bosch worked on it. Before World War II several plants were built with an annual capacity of 4 million tons of synthetic fuel. These plants were extensively used during World War II to supply Germany with fuel and lubricants.

== Process ==
The coal is finely ground and dried in a stream of hot gas. The dry product is mixed with heavy oil recycled from the process. A catalyst is typically added to the mixture. A number of catalysts have been developed over the years, including tungsten or molybdenum disulfide, tin or nickel oleate, and others. Alternatively, iron sulfide present in the coal may have sufficient catalytic activity for the process, which was the original Bergius process. The mixture is pumped into a reactor. The reaction occurs at between 400 and 500 °C (752 and 932 °F) and 20 to 70 megapascals (2,900 to 10,200 psi) hydrogen pressure. The reaction produces heavy oils, middle oils, gasoline, and gases. The overall reaction can be summarized as follows:

$n{\ce C} + (n - x + 1)\ce{H2 -> C_\mathit{n}H}_{2n - 2x + 2}$ (where x = Degrees of Unsaturation)

The immediate product from the reactor must be stabilized by passing it over a conventional hydrotreating catalyst. The product stream is high in cycloalkanes and aromatics, low in alkanes (paraffins) and very low in alkenes (olefins). The different fractions can be passed to further processing (cracking, reforming) to output synthetic fuel of desirable quality. If passed through a process such as platforming, most of the cycloalkanes are converted to aromatics and the recovered hydrogen recycled to the process. The liquid product from Platforming will contain over 75% aromatics and has a Research Octane Number (RON) of over 105.

Overall, about 97% of input carbon fed directly to the process can be converted into synthetic fuel. However, any carbon used in generating hydrogen will be lost as carbon dioxide, so reducing the overall carbon efficiency of the process.

There is a residue of unreactive tarry compounds mixed with ash from the coal and catalyst. To minimise the loss of carbon in the residue stream, it is necessary to have a low-ash feed. Typically the coal should be <10% ash by weight. The hydrogen required for the process can be also produced from coal or the residue by steam reforming. A typical hydrogen demand is ~80 kilograms (180 lb) hydrogen per ton of dry, ash-free coal. Generally, this process is similar to hydrogenation. The output is at three levels: heavy oil, middle oil, gasoline. The middle oil is hydrogenated in order to get more gasoline and the heavy oil is mixed with the coal again and the process restarts. In this way, heavy oil and middle oil fractions are also reused in this process.

The most recent evolution of Bergius' work is the 2-stage hydroliquefaction plant at Wilsonville AL which operated during 1981-85. Here a coal extract was prepared under heat and hydrogen pressure using finely pulverized coal and recycle donor solvent. As the coal molecule is broken down, free radicals are formed which are immediately stabilized by absorption of H atoms from the donor solvent. Extract then passes to a catalytic ebullated-bed hydrocracker (H-Oil unit) fed by additional hydrogen, forming lower molecular weight hydrocarbons and splitting off sulfur, oxygen and nitrogen originally present in the coal. Part of the liquid product is hydrogenated donor solvent which is returned to Stage I. The balance of liquid product is fractionated by distillation yielding various boiling range products and an ashy residue. Ashy residue goes to a Kerr-McGee critical solvent deashing unit which yields additional liquid product and a high-ash material containing unreacted coal and heavy residuum, which in a commercial plant would be gasified to make the H2 needed to feed the process. Parameters can be adjusted to avoid directly gasifying any of the coal entering the plant. Alternative versions of the plant configuration could use L-C Fining and/or an antisolvent deashing unit. Typical species in the donor solvent are fused-ring aromatics (tetrahydronaphthalene and up) or the analogous heterocycles.

== Use ==
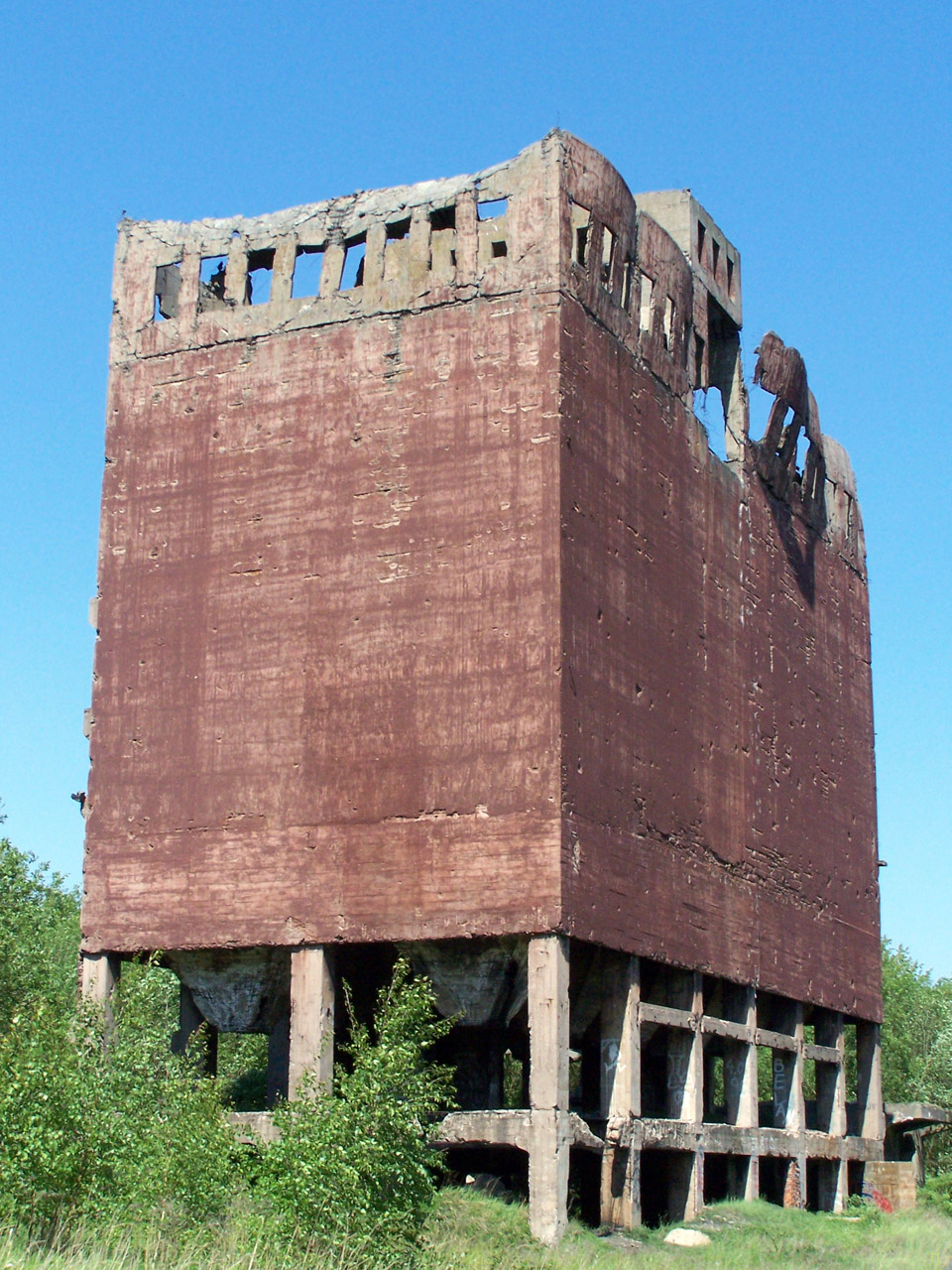
Ruins of coal elevator in a synthetic gasoline plant from WWII (IG Farben Industrie Police, Poland)

Coal hydrogenation using the Bergius process is not really used commercially in any greater capacity anymore. Instead, today the alternative Fischer–Tropsch process is most often used instead industrially, even in very large scale.

The Bergius process was extensively used by Brabag, a cartel firm of Nazi Germany. Plants that used the process were targeted for bombing during the Oil Campaign of World War II. At present there are no plants operating the Bergius Process or its derivatives commercially. The largest demonstration plant was the 200 ton per day plant at Bottrop, Germany, operated by Ruhrkohle, which ceased operation in 1993. There are reports of a Chinese company constructing a plant with a capacity of 4 000 ton per day. It was expected to become operational in 2007, but there has been no confirmation that this was achieved.

Towards the end of World War II the United States began heavily financing research into converting coal to gasoline, including money to build a series of pilot plants. The project was enormously helped by captured German technology. One plant using the Bergius process was built in Louisiana, Missouri and began operation about 1946. Located along the Mississippi river, this plant was producing gasoline in commercial quantities by 1948. The Louisiana process method produced automobile gasoline at a price slightly higher than, but comparable to, petroleum-based gasoline but of a higher quality. The facility was shut down in 1953 by the Eisenhower administration, allegedly after intense lobbying by the oil industry.

== See also ==
- Synthetic Liquid Fuels Program
- Fischer–Tropsch process
- Karrick process
- Coal-water slurry fuel
