= Paraffin oxidation =

Industrial Production Process

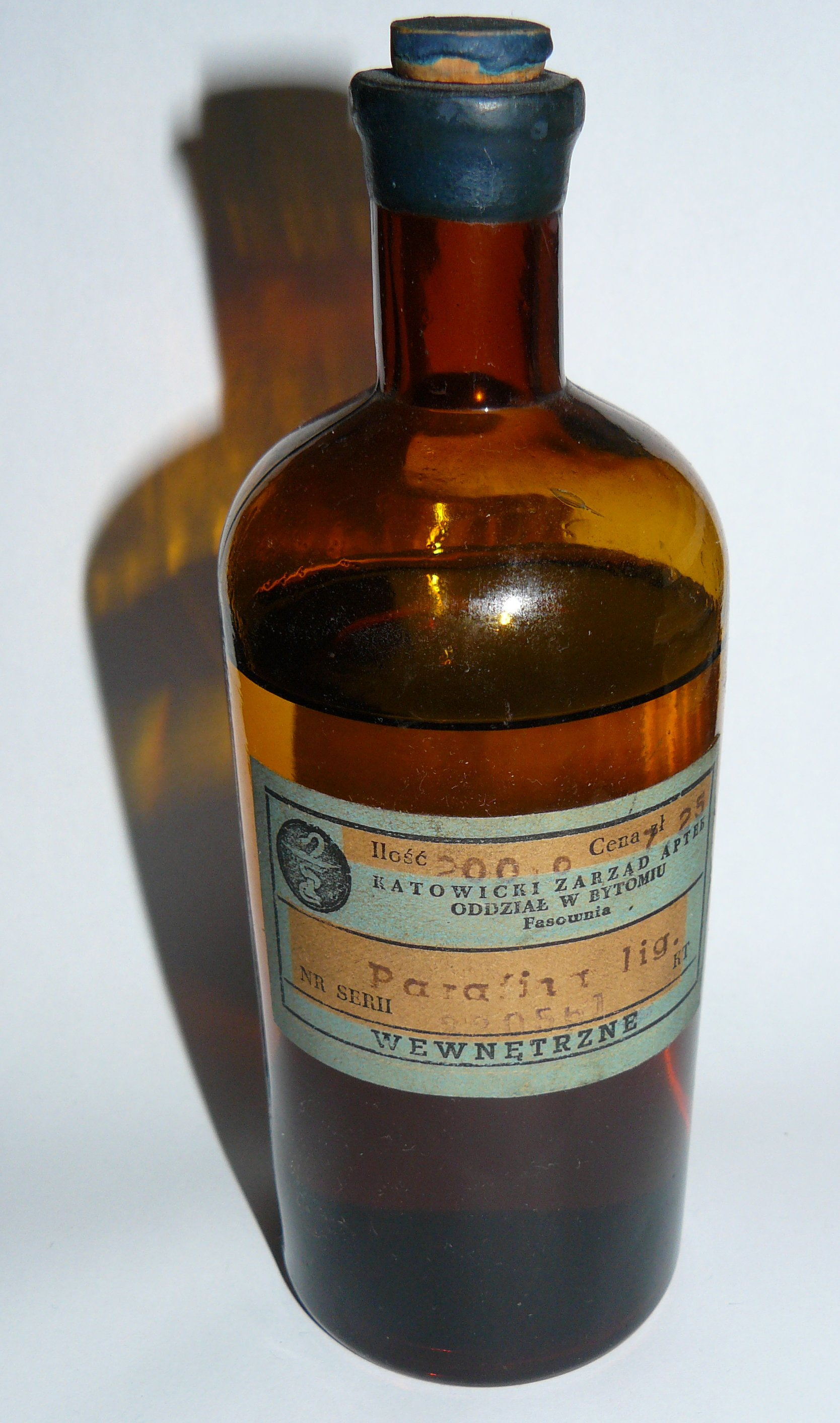
Liquid Paraffin in a glass bottle

Paraffin oxidation is a historical industrial process for the production of synthetic fatty acids. The fatty acids are further processed to consumer products such as soaps and fats as well as to lubricating greases for technical applications. Coal slack wax, a saturated, high molecular weight hydrocarbon mixture and by-product of the Fischer–Tropsch process was used as raw material. Side products were a wide range of carboxylic acids and oxidation products such as alcohols, aldehydes, esters, or ketones. The oxidation of paraffins was carried out in the liquid phase by molecular oxygen, e.g. by aerating with oxygen or atmospheric air, in the presence of catalysts such as permanganates, e.g. 0.1% - 0.3% potassium permanganate, at temperatures in the range of about 100 to 120 °C and under atmospheric pressure.

== History ==
The process was commercially important from the mid-1930s on and was carried out until the first years after the Second World War on a large industrial scale. Paraffin oxidation enabled for first time the large-scale production of synthetic butter from coal by chemical means which was at that time seen as a sensation. Because of the high availability of inexpensive natural fats and the competition by petroleum-based fatty alcohols, the process lost its importance in the early 1950s.

== Process ==
The process consisted of three main steps: oxidation, reconditioning of the oxidation mixture to crude fatty acids and eventually their separation by fractional distillation into fatty acid fractions. The chemical industry processed the fatty acid fractions further into finished products such as soaps, detergents, plasticizers and synthetic fat. The paraffin oxidation was almost exclusively run in a discontinuous batch mode.

Fractions were selected based on the intended purposes of each of the desired products:

- C_{1}-C_{4}: Acids used for industrial purposes, recovered from the vapors given off during the oxidation process
- C_{5}-C_{9}: Reduced to alcohols
- C_{9}-C_{11}: Froth flotation
- C_{9}-C_{16}: Reacted with glycerol to produce edible fats such as synthetic margarine
- C_{10}-C_{18}: Soap
- C_{18}-C_{24}: Metallic soap, lithium soap, etc.

== Mechanism ==
The first explanation for oxidation mechanism was given by the peroxide theory, developed by Alexei Nikolaevich Bach and Carl Engler, also known as the Engler-Bach theory. According to their theory, as the first step a secondary hydroperoxide is formed. The assumption that this hydroperoxide is then radically decomposed was confirmed by later studies by Eric Rideal.

- R-H + O_{2} → ROOH

The function of metal catalyst is to increase the speed of both the formation and decomposition of the hydroperoxide. This produces, among other things, an alkyl radical, which forms with oxygen peroxo radikals. This forms by abstraction of a hydrogen atom from another molecule paraffin a new alkyl radical and a hydroperoxide.

The mechanism of the reaction follows the following scheme:

As a first step the formation of a hydroperoxide occurs, which degrades as the main reaction into water and a ketone. As a side reaction secondary alcohols are formed according to the following reaction:
