= John F. Byrne Jr. =

American politician

John F. Byrne

Member of the Pennsylvania Senate from the 6th district
- In office January 2, 1967 – November 30, 1970
- Preceded by: William McLaughlin
- Succeeded by: Robert Rovner

Personal details
- Born: May 27, 1935 (age 91) Philadelphia, Pennsylvania

John F. Byrne (born May 27, 1935) is an American politician from Pennsylvania who served as a Democratic member of the Pennsylvania State Senate for the 6th district from 1967 to 1970. He is the son of John F. Byrne Sr., who also served in the state senate and on the Philadelphia City Council.

== Early life and education ==
Byrne was born in Philadelphia, Pennsylvania and graduated from the University of Pennsylvania.
