= Lewis Karrick =

American refinery engineer (189–1962)

Lewis Cass Karrick (1890–1962) was an American petroleum refinery engineer, oil shale and coal technologist, and inventor. He patented several coal and oil shale related inventions, and he also refined and perfected a low-temperature carbonization and pyrolysis process for processing coal and other carbonaceous materials, known as the Karrick process.

Lewis Carrick worked as a consulting engineer for the United States synthetic fuels studies in Utah and Ohio. In 1920s, he improved the low-temperature carbonization and pyrolysis process for processing coal and other carbonaceous materials, which is known as Karrick process. He was also actively involved in the early development of the NTU oil shale retort.

In 1930–1938, he worked as a supervisor of the coal products research at the University of Utah. In 1943, Karrick was employed by the United States Geological Survey to work on Alaska and Rockey Mountain Coal Survey. In 1950, he was transferred to the United States Bureau of Mines's Pittsburgh station.

== Patents issued to Lewis Karrick ==
- U.S. patent 1,835,878 U.S. patent 1,894,691 U.S. patent 1,899,154
- U.S. patent 1,901,169 U.S. patent 1,901,170 U.S. patent 1,906,755
- U.S. patent 1,913,395 U.S. patent 1,919,636 U.S. patent 1,923,213
- U.S. patent 1,938,596 U.S. patent 1,942,650 U.S. patent 1,945,530
- U.S. patent 1,950,558 U.S. patent 1,958,918 U.S. patent 2,011,054
- U.S. patent 2,268,989 U.S. patent 2,283,556
