= Robert A. Rovner =

American politician (1943–2021)

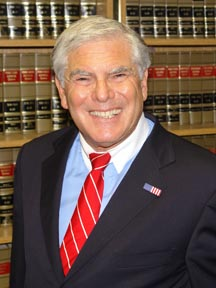

Member of the Pennsylvania Senate from the 6th district
- In office January 5, 1971 – November 30, 1974
- Preceded by: John Byrne
- Succeeded by: H. Craig Lewis

Personal details
- Born: September 28, 1943 Philadelphia, Pennsylvania
- Died: September 8, 2021 (aged 77) Philadelphia, Pennsylvania
- Party: Republican (1971–2000); Democratic
- Education: Temple University (BBA), Temple Law School (LLB)
- Occupation: Attorney

Robert A. Rovner (September 28, 1943 – September 8, 2021) was an American politician and lawyer from Pennsylvania who served as a Republican member of the Pennsylvania State Senate for the 6th district from 1971 to 1974.

== Early life and education ==
Rovner was born in Strawberry Mansion, Philadelphia, Pennsylvania and graduated from Temple University in 1965 and Temple Law School in 1968. He served as class president of each of his classes throughout both undergraduate and law school. Upon graduation from law school, Rovner served as an assistant district attorney in Philadelphia under then-District Attorney Arlen Specter before being elected to the Pennsylvania State Senate.

While serving in the Pennsylvania Senate, Rovner sponsored the state lottery bill, which earmarked money from lottery ticket sales to help senior citizens.

After serving, Rovner entered private practice. Robert Rovner led the law firm of Rovner, Allen, Rovner, Zimmerman and Nash in Feasterville, Pennsylvania in Bucks County for over forty-five years. Rovner was active in many political campaigns and charitable causes. He had been honored for his involvement in Israel Bonds. After serving as an active member of the Temple University Board of Trustees, he was granted the title of Honorary Life Trustee of the university.

== Personal life ==
Rovner lived in Philadelphia, Pennsylvania. He had two sons, Steven and Daniel Rovner, both of whom are attorneys practicing in Pennsylvania. He had four grandchildren. He was married to Susan Cohen and subsequently to Sherrie Savett.
