= Synthetic Liquid Fuels Program =

The Synthetic Liquid Fuels Program was a program run by the United States Bureau of Mines to create the technology to produce synthetic fuel from coal and oil shale. It was initiated in 1944 during World War II. The Synthetic Liquid Fuels Act approved on April 5, 1944 authorized the use of US$30 million over a five-year period for

the construction and operation of demonstration plants to produce synthetic liquid fuels from coal, oil shales, agricultural and forestry products, and other substances, in order to aid the prosecution of the war, to conserve and increase the oil resources of the Nation, and for other purposes.

== History ==
The Bureau of Mines first studied the extraction of oil from oil shale between 1925 and 1928.

Between 1928 and 1944, the Bureau experimented with coal liquefaction by hydrogenation using the Bergius process. A small-scale test unit constructed in 1937 had a 100-pound per day continuous coal feed.

Between 1945 and 1948, new laboratories were constructed near Pittsburgh. A synthetic ammonia plant Louisiana, Missouri (Missouri Ordnance Works) was transferred from the Army to the program in 1945. The plant was converted into a coal hydrogenation test facility. By 1949 the plant could produce 200 barrels (8,400 US gal; 32 m^{3}) of oil a day using the Bergius process.

Part of the personnel were German scientists, who had been extracted from Germany by Operation Paperclip.

In 1948, the program was extended to eight years and funding increased to US$60 million. A second facility was constructed at the Louisiana plant, this time using the Fischer–Tropsch process. Completed in 1951, the plant only produced 950 barrels (40,000 US gal; 151 m^{3}) of fuel.

In 1953 the new Republican-led House Appropriations Committee ended funding for the research and the Missouri plant was returned to the Department of the Army. After the 1973 oil crisis the need for domestic synthetic crude production (as well as substitute natural gas) was recognized and ERDA (subsequently DOE) embarked on a demonstration plants program, which included plants for the SRC-I and SRC-2 processes.

In 1979, after the second oil crisis, the U.S. Congress approved the Energy Security Act forming the Synthetic Fuels Corporation and authorized up to $88 million for synthetic fuels projects. This program focused on implementation of commercially available processes such as Lurgi gasification of lignite and Texaco gasification of coal to feed a gas turbine/combined cycle electric generating system.

In 1986, following the 1985 oil glut, President Reagan signed into law the Consolidated Omnibus Budget Reconciliation Act of 1985 which among other things abolished the Synthetic Fuels Corporation. It is estimated that over 40 years the cost of the various efforts at creating synthetic fuels may have totaled as much as $8 billion.

== See also ==
- Jennings Randolph
- Carbon neutral fuel
- Unconventional oil
- Future energy development
