= Franz Joseph Emil Fischer =

German chemist (1877–1947)

Franz Fischer
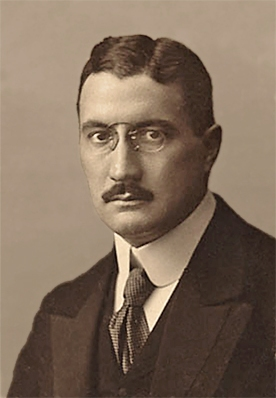
- Franz Fischer (1911)
- Born: 19 March 1877; Freiburg, Baden, Germany
- Died: 1 December 1947 (aged 70); Munich, Germany
- Education: University of Gießen
- Known for: Fischer–Tropsch process Fischer assay
- Awards: Melchett Medal (1936); Wilhelm Exner Medal (1936)
- Scientific career
- Workplaces: Kaiser Wilhelm Institute for Coal Research
- Doctoral advisor: Karl Elbs

Franz Joseph Emil Fischer (19 March 1877 in Freiburg im Breisgau – 1 December 1947 in Munich) was a German chemist. He was the founder and first director of the Kaiser Wilhelm Institute for Coal Research. He is known for the discovery of the Fischer–Tropsch process.

== Career ==
In 1925, he and Hans Tropsch discovered the Fischer–Tropsch process. This allowed for the production of liquid hydrocarbons from carbon monoxide and hydrogen with metal catalyst at temperatures of 150–300 °C (302–572 °F).

In 1930, he and Hans Schrader developed the Fischer assay, a standardized laboratory test for determining the oil yield from oil shale to be expected from a conventional shale oil extraction. He also worked with Wilhelm Ostwald and Hermann Emil Fischer. In 1913, he became the Director of the Kaiser Wilhelm Institute for Coal Research in Mülheim.

He joined the Nazi Party in 1933, and remained in office until his retirement in 1943.

== Awards ==
- Wilhelm Exner Medal, 1936
