= Industrial fermentation =

Biochemical process applied in industrial production

Industrial fermentation is the intentional use of fermentation in manufacturing processes. In addition to the mass production of fermented foods and drinks, industrial fermentation has widespread applications in chemical industry. Commodity chemicals, such as acetic acid, citric acid, and ethanol are made by fermentation. Moreover, nearly all commercially produced industrial enzymes, such as lipase, invertase and rennet, are made by fermentation with genetically modified microbes. In some cases, production of biomass itself is the objective, as is the case for single-cell proteins, baker's yeast, and starter cultures for lactic acid bacteria used in cheesemaking.

In general, fermentations can be divided into four types:

- Production of biomass (viable cellular material)
- Production of extracellular metabolites (chemical compounds)
- Production of intracellular components (enzymes and other proteins)
- Transformation of substrate (in which the transformed substrate is itself the product)

These types are not necessarily disjoined from each other, but provide a framework for understanding the differences in approach. The organisms used are typically microorganisms, particularly bacteria, algae, and fungi, such as yeasts and molds, but industrial fermentation may also involve cell cultures from plants and animals, such as CHO cells and insect cells. Special considerations are required for the specific organisms used in the fermentation, such as the dissolved oxygen level, nutrient levels, and temperature. The rate of fermentation depends on the concentration of microorganisms, cells, cellular components, and enzymes as well as temperature, pH and level of oxygen for aerobic fermentation. Product recovery frequently involves the concentration of the dilute solution.

== General process overview ==
In most industrial fermentations, the organisms or eukaryotic cells are submerged in a liquid medium; in others, such as the fermentation of cocoa beans, coffee cherries, and miso, fermentation takes place on the moist surface of the medium.

There are also industrial considerations related to the fermentation process. For instance, to avoid biological process contamination, the fermentation medium, air, and equipment are sterilized. Foam control can be achieved by either mechanical foam destruction or chemical anti-foaming agents. Several other factors must be measured and controlled such as pressure, temperature, agitator shaft power, and viscosity. An important element for industrial fermentations is scale up. This is the conversion of a laboratory procedure to an industrial process. It is well established in the field of industrial microbiology that what works well at the laboratory scale may work poorly or not at all when first attempted at large scale. It is generally not possible to take fermentation conditions that have worked in the laboratory and blindly apply them to industrial scale equipment. Although many parameters have been tested for use as scale up criteria, there is no general formula because of the variation in fermentation processes. The most important methods are the maintenance of constant power consumption per unit of broth and the maintenance of constant volumetric transfer rate.

=== Phases of growth ===
Bacterial growth curve

Fermentation begins once the growth medium is inoculated with the organism of interest. Growth of the inoculum does not occur immediately. This is the period of adaptation, called the lag phase. Following the lag phase, the rate of growth of the organism steadily increases, for a certain period—this period is the log or exponential phase.

After a phase of exponential growth, the rate of growth slows down, due to the continuously falling concentrations of nutrients and/or a continuously increasing (accumulating) concentrations of toxic substances. This phase, where the increase of the rate of growth is checked, is the deceleration phase. After the deceleration phase, growth ceases and the culture enters a stationary phase or a steady state. The biomass remains constant, except when certain accumulated chemicals in the culture chemically break down the cells in a process called chemolysis. Unless other microorganisms contaminate the culture, the chemical constitution remains unchanged. If all of the nutrients in the medium are consumed, or if the concentration of toxins is too great, the cells may become senescent and begin to die off. The total amount of biomass may not decrease, but the number of viable organisms will decrease.

=== Fermentation medium ===
The microbes or eukaryotic cells used for fermentation grow in (or on) specially designed growth medium which supplies the nutrients required by the organisms or cells. A variety of media exist, but invariably contain a carbon source, a nitrogen source, water, salts, and micronutrients. In the production of wine, the medium is grape must. In the production of bio-ethanol, the medium may consist mostly of whatever inexpensive carbon source is available.

Carbon sources are typically sugars or other carbohydrates, although in the case of substrate transformations (such as the production of vinegar) the carbon source may be an alcohol or something else altogether. For large scale fermentations, such as those used for the production of ethanol, inexpensive sources of carbohydrates, such as molasses, corn steep liquor, sugar cane juice, or sugar beet juice are used to minimize costs. More sensitive fermentations may instead use purified glucose, sucrose, glycerol or other sugars, which reduces variation and helps ensure the purity of the final product. Organisms meant to produce enzymes such as beta galactosidase, invertase or other amylases may be fed starch to select for organisms that express the enzymes in large quantity.

Fixed nitrogen sources are required for most organisms to synthesize proteins, nucleic acids and other cellular components. Depending on the enzyme capabilities of the organism, nitrogen may be provided as bulk protein, such as soy meal; as pre-digested polypeptides, such as peptone or tryptone; or as ammonia or nitrate salts. Cost is also an important factor in the choice of a nitrogen source. Phosphorus is needed for production of phospholipids in cellular membranes and for the production of nucleic acids. The amount of phosphate which must be added depends upon the composition of the broth and the needs of the organism, as well as the objective of the fermentation. For instance, some cultures will not produce secondary metabolites in the presence of phosphate.

Growth factors and trace nutrients are included in the fermentation broth for organisms incapable of producing all of the vitamins they require. Yeast extract is a common source of micronutrients and vitamins for fermentation media. Inorganic nutrients, including trace elements such as iron, zinc, copper, manganese, molybdenum, and cobalt are typically present in unrefined carbon and nitrogen sources, but may have to be added when purified carbon and nitrogen sources are used. Fermentations which produce large amounts of gas (or which require the addition of gas) will tend to form a layer of foam, since fermentation broth typically contains a variety of foam-reinforcing proteins, peptides or starches. To prevent this foam from occurring or accumulating, antifoaming agents may be added. Mineral buffering salts, such as carbonates and phosphates, may be used to stabilize pH near optimum. When metal ions are present in high concentrations, use of a chelating agent may be necessary.

Developing an optimal medium for fermentation is a key concept in efficient optimization. One-factor-at-a-time (OFAT) is the preferential choice that researchers use for designing a medium composition. This method involves changing only one factor at a time while keeping the other concentrations constant. This method can be separated into some sub groups. One is Removal Experiments. In this experiment all the components of the medium are removed one at a time and their effects on the medium are observed. Supplementation experiments involve evaluating the effects of nitrogen and carbon supplements on production. The final experiment is a replacement experiment. This involves replacing the nitrogen and carbon sources that show an enhancement effect on the intended production. Overall OFAT is a major advantage over other optimization methods because of its simplicity.

== Production of biomass ==
Microbial cells or biomass is sometimes the intended product of fermentation. Examples include single cell protein, bakers yeast, lactobacillus, E. coli, and others. In the case of single-cell protein, algae is grown in large open ponds which allow photosynthesis to occur. If the biomass is to be used for inoculation of other fermentations, care must be taken to prevent mutations from occurring.

== Production of extracellular metabolites ==
Metabolites can be divided into two groups: those produced during the growth phase of the organism, called primary metabolites and those produced during the stationary phase, called secondary metabolites. Some examples of primary metabolites are ethanol, citric acid, glutamic acid, lysine, vitamins and polysaccharides. Some examples of secondary metabolites are penicillin, cyclosporin A, gibberellin, and lovastatin.

=== Primary metabolites ===
Primary metabolites are compounds made during the ordinary metabolism of the organism during the growth phase. A common example is ethanol or lactic acid, produced during glycolysis. Citric acid is produced by some strains of Aspergillus niger as part of the citric acid cycle to acidify their environment and prevent competitors from taking over. Glutamate is produced by some Micrococcus species, and some Corynebacterium species produce lysine, threonine, tryptophan and other amino acids. All of these compounds are produced during the normal "business" of the cell and released into the environment. There is therefore no need to rupture the cells for product recovery.

=== Secondary metabolites ===
Secondary metabolites are compounds made in the stationary phase; penicillin, for instance, prevents the growth of bacteria which could compete with Penicillium molds for resources. Some bacteria, such as Lactobacillus species, are able to produce bacteriocins which prevent the growth of bacterial competitors as well. These compounds are of obvious value to humans wishing to prevent the growth of bacteria, either as antibiotics or as antiseptics (such as gramicidin S). Fungicides, such as griseofulvin are also produced as secondary metabolites. Typically secondary metabolites are not produced in the presence of glucose or other carbon sources which would encourage growth, and like primary metabolites are released into the surrounding medium without rupture of the cell membrane.

In the early days of the biotechnology industry, most biopharmaceutical products were made in E. coli; by 2004 more biopharmaceuticals were manufactured in eukaryotic cells, such as CHO cells, than in microbes, but used similar bioreactor systems. Insect cell culture systems came into use in the 2000s as well.

== Production of intracellular components ==
Of primary interest among the intracellular components are microbial enzymes: catalase, amylase, protease, pectinase, cellulase, hemicellulase, lipase, lactase, streptokinase and many others. Recombinant proteins, such as insulin, hepatitis B vaccine, interferon, granulocyte colony-stimulating factor, streptokinase and others are also made this way. The largest difference between this process and the others is that the cells must be ruptured (lysed) at the end of fermentation, and the environment must be manipulated to maximize the amount of the product. Furthermore, the product (typically a protein) must be separated from all of the other cellular proteins in the lysate to be purified.

== Transformation of substrate ==
Substrate transformation involves the transformation of a specific compound into another, such as in the case of phenylacetylcarbinol, and steroid biotransformation, or the transformation of a raw material into a finished product, in the case of food fermentations and sewage treatment.

=== Food fermentation ===
In the history of food, ancient fermented food processes, such as making bread, wine, cheese, curds, idli, dosa, among others can be dated to more than seven thousand years ago. They were developed long before humanity had any knowledge of the existence of the microorganisms involved. Some foods such as Marmite are the byproduct of the fermentation process, in this case in the production of beer.

=== Ethanol fuel ===
Fermentation is the main source of ethanol in the production of ethanol fuel. Common crops such as sugar cane, potato, cassava, and maize are fermented by yeast to produce ethanol which is further processed to become fuel.

=== Sewage treatment ===
In the process of sewage treatment, sewage is digested by enzymes secreted by bacteria. Solid organic matters are broken down into harmless, soluble substances and carbon dioxide. Liquids that result are disinfected to remove pathogens before being discharged into rivers or the sea or can be used as liquid fertilizers. Digested solids, known also as sludge, is dried and used as fertilizer. Gaseous byproducts such as methane can be utilized as biogas to fuel electrical generators. One advantage of bacterial digestion is that it reduces the bulk and odor of sewage, thus reducing space needed for dumping. The main disadvantage of bacterial digestion in sewage disposal is that it is a very slow process.

=== Agricultural feed ===
A wide variety of agroindustrial waste products can be fermented to use as food for animals, especially ruminants. Fungi have been employed to break down cellulosic wastes to increase protein content and improve in vitro digestibility.

== Precision fermentation ==
Precision fermentation is an approach to manufacturing specific functional products which intends to minimise the production of unwanted by-products through the application of synthetic biology, particularly by generating synthetic "cell factories" with engineered genomes and metabolic pathways optimised to produce the desired compounds as efficiently as possible with the available resources. Precision fermentation of genetically modified microorganisms may be used to manufacture proteins needed for cell culture media, providing for serum-free cell culture media in the manufacturing process of cultured meat. A 2021 publication showed that photovoltaic-driven microbial protein production could use 10 times less land for an equivalent amount of protein compared to soybean cultivation. Some Food Regulatory Agencies such as the FDA do not require the labeling of precision fermented foods as GMO since they are produced by, but do not contain the genetically engineered organisms. It is unclear how regulation will be handled in EU markets, with some startups such as Formo and Those Vegan Cowboys forming the Food Fermentation Europe (FFE) alliance together with other alt-protein startups to seek regulatory approval.

== See also ==
- Cellular agriculture – Production of agriculture products from cell cultures
- Chemical engineering – Engineering discipline focused on the design and operation of chemical plants
- Chemostat – Type of bioreactor
- Edible algae vaccine – Vaccination strategy being researched
- Fed-batch – Operational technique in biotechnological processes
- Food microbiology – Study of the microorganisms that inhabit, create, or contaminate food
- Precision agriculture – Farming management strategy
- Zymology – Study of fermentation and its uses
