= Scale-down bioreactor =

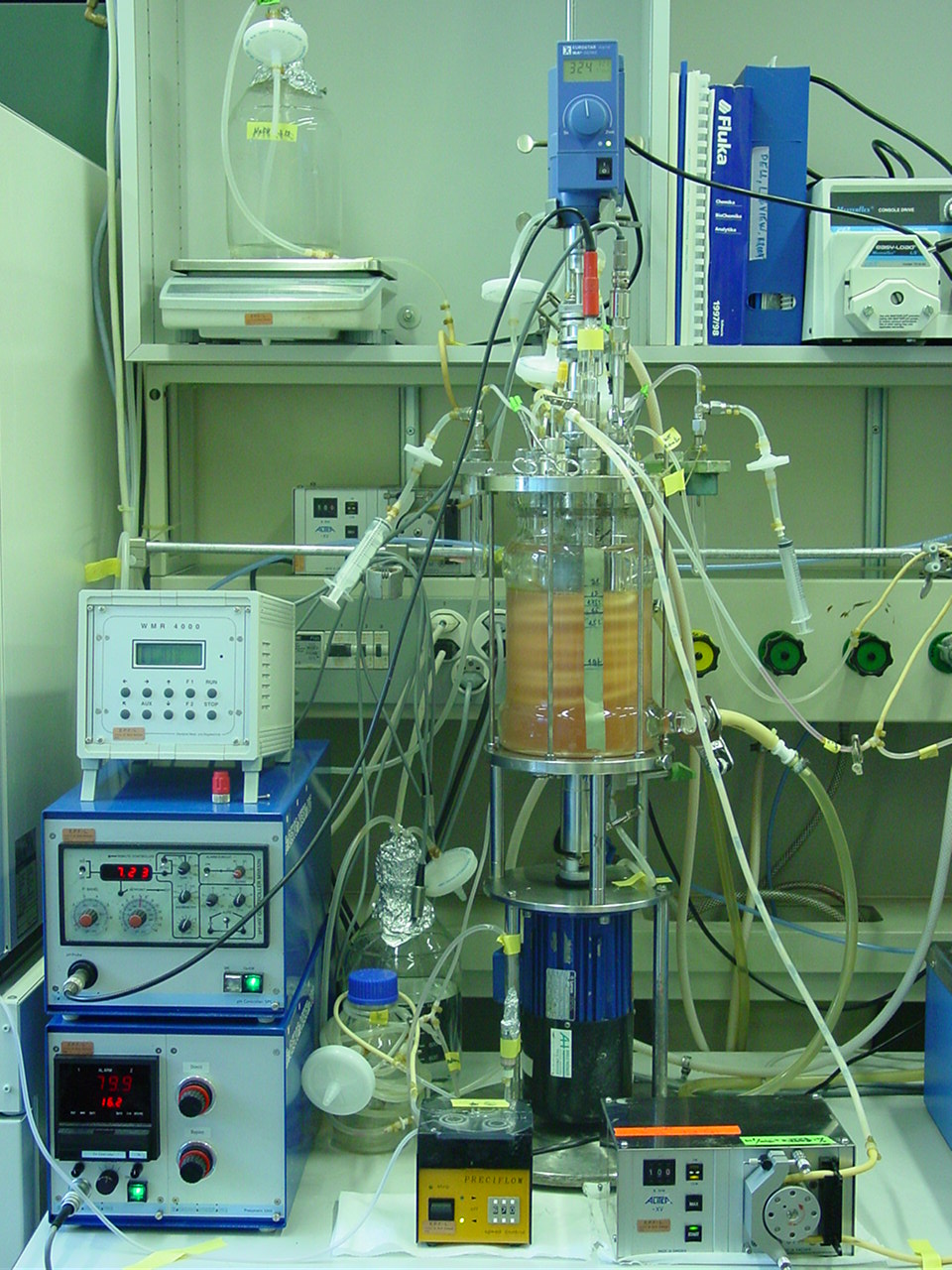
Small scale bioreactor cultivation. Picture describes a mammalian cell bench - scale down cultivations

A scale-down bioreactor is a miniature model designed to mimic or reproduce large-scale bio-processes or specific process steps on a smaller scale. These models play an important role during process development stage by fine-tuning the minute parameters and steps without the need for substantial investments in both materials and consumables. Vessel geometry like aspect ratios, impeller designs, and sparger placements should be nearly identical between the small and large scales. For this purpose computer fluid dynamics (CFD) are used as they can be employed to investigate the scalability of mixing processes from small-scale models to larger production scales. Scientists use outcome of these studies on scale down systems to derive and facilitate the transition from laboratory-scale studies to industrial large-scale conditions.

== Types of scale-down bioreactors ==
Stirred tank bioreactors are systems further developed to two compartment systems to provide a fundamental structure for Scale down bioreactors. Two commonly used developed systems are cells which are circulated between either two stirred tank reactors (STR–STR), or from a STR through a plug flow reactor (STR–PFR).

=== STR-STR ===
The application of coupled stirred-tank reactors in scale-down models is a powerful technical model for simulating and studying the complex conditions of large-scale industrial bioreactors. It provides a controlled environment to replicate non-homogeneous conditions, these models offer valuable insights into optimizing bioprocesses, ensuring consistent product quality, and reducing costs and time in biotechnological production. Co-cultures, meaning that more than two microbes complementing cultivation can be conducted. One such recent study conducted for two compartment bioreactor is the production of Violecin.

=== STR-PFR ===
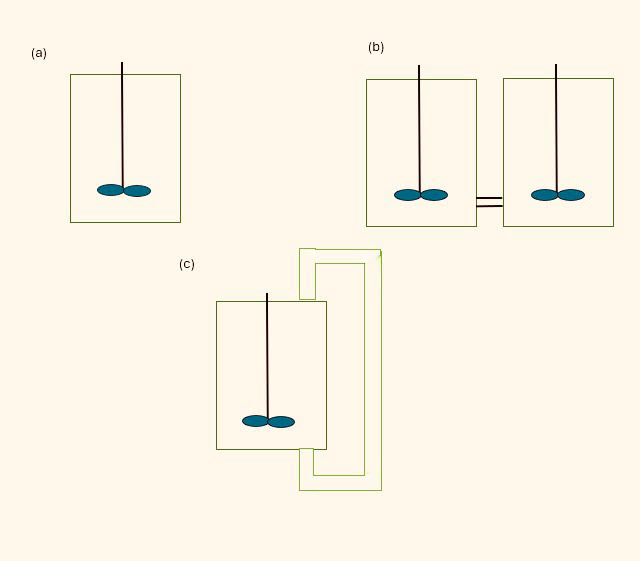
Different types of scale-down bioreactors used for research purpose:(a) Stirred tank bioreactor, (b) Stirred tank bioreactor coupled to a stirred tank bioreactor, (c) stirred tank bioreactor coupled to plug flow bioreactor.

Scale down reactors can be two compartment bioreactor. In a two-compartment bioreactor setup, the first compartment can be operated as an STR for initial growth/biomass buildup, while the second compartment functions as a PFR for the production phase with a defined residence time. Fusing a mixed stirred tank reactor (STR) with a plug flow reactor (PFR) in a two-compartment system offers significant options in flow characteristics to meet specific process requirements. This configuration allows for precise control over various factors, including improved bioprocess results by enhancing residence time distribution and substrate gradients. The integration of this system results in a portion of the culture being exposed to varying environmental cues, such as altered mixing times, nutrient deprivation, aeration, pH, or temperature, before being recirculated in to the main STR. The formed perturbations simulate transient stresses encountered in large-scale industrial reactors. The residence time in the PFR zone is calibrated to match the typical timescale experienced in large scale industrial bioprocesses. This system is further optimized to explore shorter timescales and they are termed dynamic microfluidic systems. Computational fluid dynamics (CFD) simulations can predict and model the flow patterns in STR-PFR complex systems.

== Advantages of scale-down bioreactors ==
E.coli, a commonly used organism for cell factory engineering to produce recombinant proteins.

=== Efficient exploration of operating conditions ===
During process development, a wide range of operating conditions should be deployed, in order to identify the optimal parameter ranges, and is crucial to achieve successful large scale bioprocesses. However, due to number of experiments in large-scale fermenters can be time-consuming, resource-intensive, and cost. Hence, smaller scale-down systems, in the form of miniaturized bioreactors ranging from micro liters to milliliters in scale.

Miniaturized bioreactors enable researchers to conduct numerous experiments simultaneously, exploring various combinations of process parameters such as temperature, pH, agitation rates, and nutrient concentrations. These models facilitate efficient process optimization at a small scale, the insights gained from these experiments can be seamlessly transferred to larger-scale systems. The scalability of the process parameters and operating conditions identified through scale-down models ensures a smooth transition to pilot and commercial-scale production. This high-throughput approach allows for rapid screening and identification of optimal operating conditions, which would be impractical and costly with larger-scale systems. By working at a smaller scale, these miniaturized bioreactors significantly reduce the consumption of raw materials, media components, and other consumables needed for reactor fermentations runs. This resource-efficient approach not only minimizes costs but also aligns with sustainable practices, reducing waste and environmental impact. Bioprocess Engineering strategies are applied to upgrade and enhance the overall productivity of the cultivation experiments. Some important parameters like oxygen transfer rate (OTR), dissolved oxygen concentration, superficial gas velocity, volume‐specific power input P/V, mixing time, could be modified and optimized to obtain high titre formation according to the desired requirements. These titre values could be comparable to values obtained in large scale industrial bioprocesses.

=== Efficient microbial strain testing and characterization ===
Microbial strain Engineering and cell factory engineering is a developing area of interest and important in determining the outcome of large scale fermentation. With the development in metabolic engineering and synthetic biology new strains are constructed, which need to be tested in large scale like conditions. This is an instance where scale down bioreactors could be coupled with microbial strain engineering to broaden the scope of research and bridge the gap between two interdisciplinary fields of studies.

== Application of computational fluid dynamics ==
By developing and applying computational fluid dynamics simulations, process scientists and engineers can gain valuable insights into the fluid flow patterns and mixing dynamics within various geometries.The ability to run multiple experiments in parallel, combined with the reduced resource requirements, translates into accelerated process development timelines. Researchers can quickly iterate through various conditions, analyze results, and make informed decisions, ultimately shortening the overall development cycle. Two parameters that need to be focused on are the Reynolds number and power number, as non-dimensional values for technical know-how and scaling processes, both upscaling and scale-down processes. By understanding this relationship between power number and reynold's number, it becomes possible to predict the power requirements for a given flow regime and impeller configuration. This knowledge is crucial for designing and operating agitated systems at different scales while maintaining consistent mixing performance.
