= Changestat =

Changestat is a continuous cultivation method that is used for acquiring quantitative data of a microorganism's metabolism at various environmental conditions within a single experiment. Every changestat always starts as a continuous cultivation experiment (chemostat, turbidostat), but after reaching steady state, smooth and slow change of an environmental parameter is applied. Two most common changestat techniques are accelerostat (A-stat) and dilution rate stat (D-stat).

In case of A-stat the changing environmental parameter is dilution rate (D, h^{−1}) that causes the increase of specific growth rate (μ, h^{−1}). When the acceleration of dilution (a) is chosen correctly then D = μ as in chemostat. The problem of choosing the correct acceleration of dilution has been studied with Escherichia coli and Lactococcus lactis resulting recommended range of 0.01-0.005 h^{−2}.

In D-stat dilution rate is always constant as in chemostat, but after reaching steady state environmental parameter other than dilution rate is changed. For instance temperature, pH or acetate concentration has been smoothly changed in bioreactor. Turbidostat type changestats are called Z-auxoaccelerostats (pH-auxoaccelerostat, CO_{2}-auxoaccelerostat). In similar to D-stat after reaching steady state a selected environmental parameter is changed.
