= Bacterial growth =

Growth of bacterial colonies

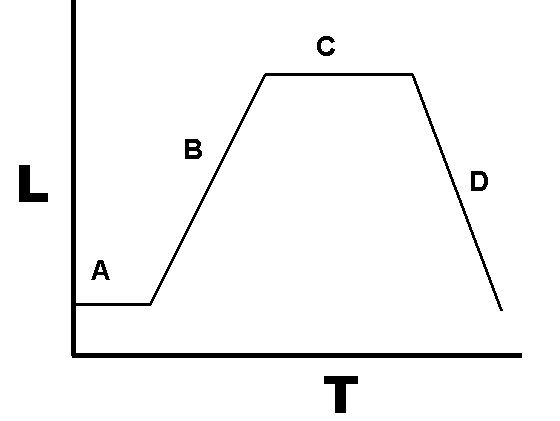
Growth is shown as L = log(numbers), where numbers is the number of colony-forming units per ml, versus T (time.)

Bacterial growth is the proliferation of a bacterium into two daughter cells, in a process called binary fission. If no mutation event occurs, the resulting daughter cells are genetically identical to the original cell. Hence, bacterial growth occurs. Both daughter cells from the division do not necessarily survive. However, if the surviving number exceeds unity on average, the bacterial population undergoes exponential growth. The measurement of an exponential bacterial growth curve in batch culture was traditionally a part of the training of all microbiologists; the basic means require bacterial enumeration (cell counting) by direct and individual (microscopic, flow cytometry), direct and bulk (biomass), indirect and individual (colony counting), or indirect and bulk (most probable number, turbidity, nutrient uptake) methods. Models reconcile theory with the measurements.

== Phases ==
Bacterial growth curve\Kinetic Curve

In autecological studies, the growth of bacteria (or other microorganisms, as protozoa, microalgae or yeasts) in batch culture can be modeled with four different phases: lag phase (A), log phase or exponential phase (B), stationary phase (C), and death phase (D).

1. During lag phase, bacteria adapt themselves to growth conditions. It is the period where the individual bacteria are maturing and not yet able to divide. During the lag phase of the bacterial growth cycle, the synthesis of RNA, enzymes and other molecules occurs. During the lag phase cells change very little because the cells do not immediately reproduce in a new medium. This period of little to no cell division is called the lag phase and can last for 1 hour to several days. During this phase cells are not dormant.
2. The log phase (sometimes called the logarithmic phase or the exponential phase) is a period characterized by cell doubling. The number of new bacteria appearing per unit time is proportional to the present population. If growth is not limited, doubling will continue at a constant rate so both the number of cells and the rate of population increase doubles with each consecutive time period. For this type of exponential growth, plotting the natural logarithm of cell number against time produces a straight line. The slope of this line is the specific growth rate of the organism, which is a measure of the number of divisions per cell per unit time. The actual rate of this growth (i.e. the slope of the line in the figure) depends upon the growth conditions, which affect the frequency of cell division events and the probability of both daughter cells surviving. Under controlled conditions, cyanobacteria can double their population four times a day and then they can triple their population. Exponential growth cannot continue indefinitely, however, because the medium is soon depleted of nutrients and enriched with wastes.
3. The stationary phase is often due to a growth-limiting factor such as the depletion of an essential nutrient, and/or the formation of an inhibitory product such as an organic acid. Stationary phase results from a situation in which growth rate and death rate are equal. The number of new cells created is limited by the growth factor and as a result the rate of cell growth matches the rate of cell death. The result is a "smooth," horizontal linear part of the curve during the stationary phase. Mutations can occur during stationary phase. Bridges et al. (2001) presented evidence that DNA damage is responsible for many of the mutations arising in the genomes of stationary phase or starving bacteria. Endogenously generated reactive oxygen species appear to be a major source of such damages. Bacteria in this phase sometimes enter dormancy, using hibernation factors to slow their metabolism.
4. At death phase (decline phase), bacteria die. This could be caused by lack of nutrients, environmental temperature above or below the tolerance band for the species, or other injurious conditions.

This basic batch culture growth model draws out and emphasizes aspects of bacterial growth which may differ from the growth of macrofauna. It emphasizes clonality, asexual binary division, the short development time relative to replication itself, the seemingly low death rate, the need to move from a dormant state to a reproductive state or to condition the media, and finally, the tendency of lab adapted strains to exhaust their nutrients. In reality, even in batch culture, the four phases are not well defined. The cells do not reproduce in synchrony without explicit and continual prompting (as in experiments with stalked bacteria) and their exponential phase growth is often not ever a constant rate, but instead a slowly decaying rate, a constant stochastic response to pressures both to reproduce and to go dormant in the face of declining nutrient concentrations and increasing waste concentrations.

The decrease in number of bacteria may even become logarithmic. Hence, this phase of growth may also be called as negative logarithmic or negative exponential growth phase.

Near the end of the logarithmic phase of a batch culture, competence for natural genetic transformation may be induced, as in Bacillus subtilis and in other bacteria. Natural genetic transformation is a form of DNA transfer that appears to be an adaptation for repairing DNA damages.

Batch culture is the most common laboratory growth method in which bacterial growth is studied, but it is only one of many. It is ideally spatially unstructured and temporally structured. The bacterial culture is incubated in a closed vessel with a single batch of medium. In some experimental regimes, some of the bacterial culture is periodically removed and added to fresh sterile medium. In the extreme case, this leads to the continual renewal of the nutrients. This is a chemostat, also known as continuous culture. It is ideally spatially unstructured and temporally unstructured, in a steady state defined by the rates of nutrient supply and bacterial growth. In comparison to batch culture, bacteria are maintained in exponential growth phase, and the growth rate of the bacteria is known. Related devices include turbidostats and auxostats. When Escherichia coli is growing very slowly with a doubling time of 16 hours in a chemostat most cells have a single chromosome.

Bacterial growth can be suppressed with bacteriostats, without necessarily killing the bacteria. Certain toxins can be used to suppress bacterial growth or kill bacteria. Antibiotics (or, more properly, antibacterial drugs) are drugs used to kill bacteria; they can have side effects or even cause adverse reactions in people, but they are not classified as toxins. In a synecological, true-to-nature situation in which more than one bacterial species is present, the growth of microbes is more dynamic and continual.

Liquid is not the only laboratory environment for bacterial growth. Spatially structured environments such as biofilms or agar surfaces present additional complex growth models.

== Polyauxic growth ==
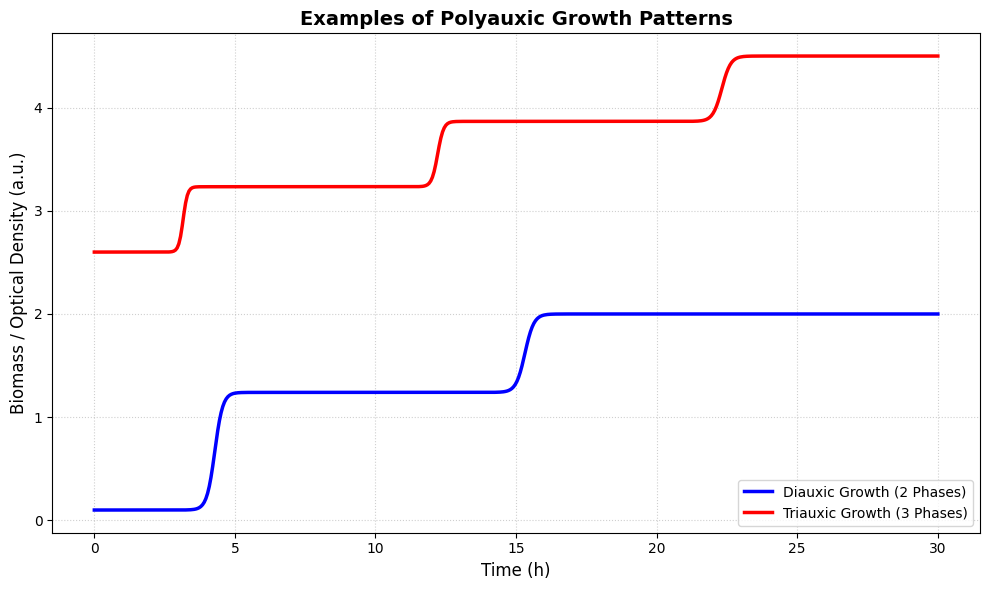
Comparison of diauxic (two-phase) and triauxic (three-phase) bacterial growth patterns. The plateaus represent temporary stationary phases where the microbial population adapts to a new substrate.

Polyauxic growth (from Greek poly meaning "many" and auxein meaning "to grow") refers to a multiphasic microbial growth pattern characterized by multiple distinct exponential phases separated by temporary stationary or lag periods. This phenomenon occurs when microorganisms are cultivated in a complex medium containing a mixture of carbon sources (substrates) that are consumed sequentially rather than simultaneously.

The simplest and most classic form is diauxic growth (two phases), first rigorously described by Jacques Monod in his doctoral thesis (1941) and subsequent papers (1945). In his experiments with Escherichia coli, Monod observed that when provided with both glucose and lactose, the bacteria preferentially utilized glucose first because it is thermodynamically more efficient to metabolize. During this first phase, the enzymes required for lactose metabolism are inhibited—a regulatory mechanism known as catabolite repression. Only after the glucose is completely exhausted does the population enter a temporary lag phase to synthesize the necessary enzymes (e.g., beta-galactosidase), leading to a second exponential growth phase on lactose.

In complex environmental or industrial contexts, such as the fermentation of lignocellulosic hydrolysates or waste streams, bacteria may encounter diverse nutrient pools leading to higher-order polyauxic patterns (e.g., triauxic or tetra-auxic growth). Accurate mathematical modeling of these dynamics is essential for bioprocess control. While classical models (e.g., the Gompertz function) describe single-phase growth, modern semi-mechanistic frameworks represent polyauxie as a summation of multiple sigmoidal phases. These models allow researchers to explicitly estimate kinetic parameters—such as the maximum specific growth rate ($r_{\text{max}}$) and lag phase duration ($\lambda$)—for each individual substrate consumption phase.

== The 5th phase: Long-term stationary phase ==
Long-term stationary phase, unlike early stationary phase (in which there is little cell division), is a highly dynamic period in which the birth and death rates are balanced. It has been proven that after death phase E. coli can be maintained in batch culture for long periods without adding nutrients. By providing sterile distilled water to maintain volume and osmolarity, aerobically grown cultures can be maintained at densities of ~10^{6} colony-forming units (CFUs) per ml for more than 5 years without the addition of nutrients in batch culture.

== Environmental conditions ==
Environmental factors influence rate of bacterial growth such as acidity (pH), temperature, water activity, macro and micro nutrients, oxygen levels, and toxins. Conditions tend to be relatively consistent between bacteria with the exception of extremophiles. Bacterium have optimal growth conditions under which they thrive, but once outside of those conditions the stress can result in either reduced or stalled growth, dormancy (such as formation spores), or death. Maintaining sub-optimal growth conditions is a key principle to food preservation.

=== Temperature ===
The majority of microbes grow best at moderate temperatures. Maintaining sub-optimal growth temperatures is vital to food preservation. This principle has led to the adoption of refrigeration and thorough cooking methods. Microbes are classified by the temperatures at which they grow and thrive. They can be classified into:

- Psychrophiles

Psychrophiles are extremophilic microbes adapted to lower temperatures. The optimal temperature for growth is between 0 and 15 degrees Celsius. Psychrophiles are typically found in Earth's extremely cold ecosystems, such as polar ice-cap regions, permafrost, polar surfaces, and deep oceans. To survive in these locations, psychrophiles must be adapted to cold temperatures as well as extreme environmental conditions. While these physiological adaptations are not fully studied or understood, some adaptations include membrane fluidity regulation, cold-acclimated protein synthesis, and freeze tolerance. At the enzyme level, destabilizing the active site or the whole protein allows the protein to remain active and flexible at temperatures that generally freeze molecular motion.

- Mesophiles

Mesophiles are named for their preference to grow at moderate temperatures, between 20 and 45 degrees Celsius. Mesophiles encompass the majority of microbes.

Pathogens affecting the human body are typically mesophiles, as they grow best in the human body's moderate temperature range.

- Thermophiles

Thermophiles are microbes that thrive in higher temperatures between 45 and 80 degrees Celsius. They include moderate thermophiles, which grow between 45 and 70 degrees Celsius, and extreme thermophiles, which grow above 70 degrees Celsius. Extreme thermophiles are often found in geothermally or volcanically heated environments. Thermophiles have a variety of mechanisms to survive at these temperatures. DNA-binding proteins pack DNA into nucleosomes for more stability at high temperatures. Membrane modifications are made to improve rigidity, such as iso-branched fatty acids. Many thermophiles have smaller genome sizes, which lowers the energy needed for cell division.

=== Acidity ===
Optimal acidity for bacteria tends to be around pH 6.5 to 7.0 (neutral), those living in lesser pH being acidophiles and higher alkalophiles. Some bacteria can change the pH such as by excreting acid resulting in sub-optimal conditions.

=== Water activity ===
Environmental conditions affecting microbial growth are typically studied individually. However, temperature and moisture conditions are often closely linked. Despite temperature conditions, bacterial growth rates decrease at lower soil moisture levels.

=== Oxygen ===
Bacteria can be aerobes or anaerobes. Depending on the degree of oxygen required bacteria can fall into the following classes:

1. facultative-anaerobes-ie aerotolerant absence or minimal oxygen required for their growth
2. obligate-anaerobes grow only in complete absence of oxygen
3. facultative aerobes-can grow either in presence or minimal oxygen
4. obligate aerobes-grow only in the presence of oxygen

=== Micronutrients ===
Microbes need sufficient nutrients for growth. Micronutrients needed for microbial growth include zinc, copper, manganese, and iron. While micronutrients typically are not a limiting factor for microbial growth in the wild, they act as cofactors and aid enzymes. Nutrient requirements vary by microbial species. For example, diatoms require B vitamins, such as B12, for amino acid synthesis and methionine synthase, which aids diatoms in cell growth. While micronutrients are needed in adequate amounts for growth and efficiency, excess micronutrients may be harmful to microbial growth.

=== Toxic compounds ===
Toxic compounds such as ethanol can hinder growth or kill bacteria. This is used beneficially for disinfection and in food preservation.

== See also ==
- Monod equation
- Michaelis–Menten kinetics
- Cell proliferation
