= Nest protection hypothesis =

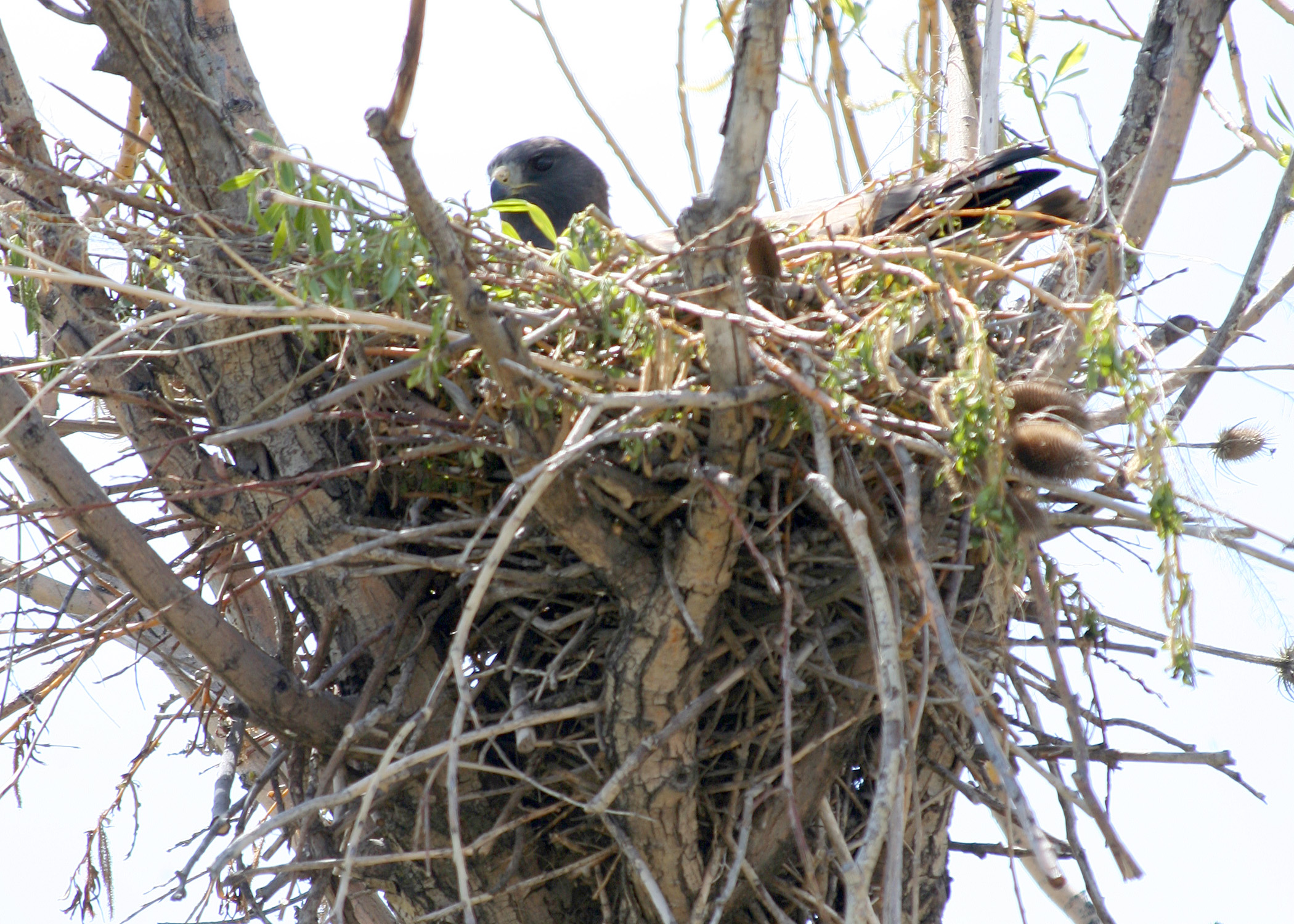
Fresh greenery visible in the nest of a red-tailed hawk (Buteo jamaicensis)

The nest protection hypothesis (NPH) is one of multiple hypotheses that seek to explain the behaviour of birds repeatedly introducing green, often aromatic, plant material into the nest after its completion and throughout the incubation and nestling periods. The hypothesis suggests that this behaviour is an evolutionary strategy to ward off or kill ectoparasites that would otherwise cause higher nestling mortality through blood loss and the spread of pathogens. The aromatic species of greenery are often collected from trees and long-living shrubs containing strong aromatic compounds which are expected to either disrupt olfaction in host seeking parasites or kill harmful parasites and pathogens.

In more recent reviews on NPH, the name of the hypothesis has been critiqued for its inaccuracy, suggesting chick-protection hypothesis as a more suitable alternative, since protection is being conveyed, not to the nest, but to the chicks instead.

== Supporting evidence ==
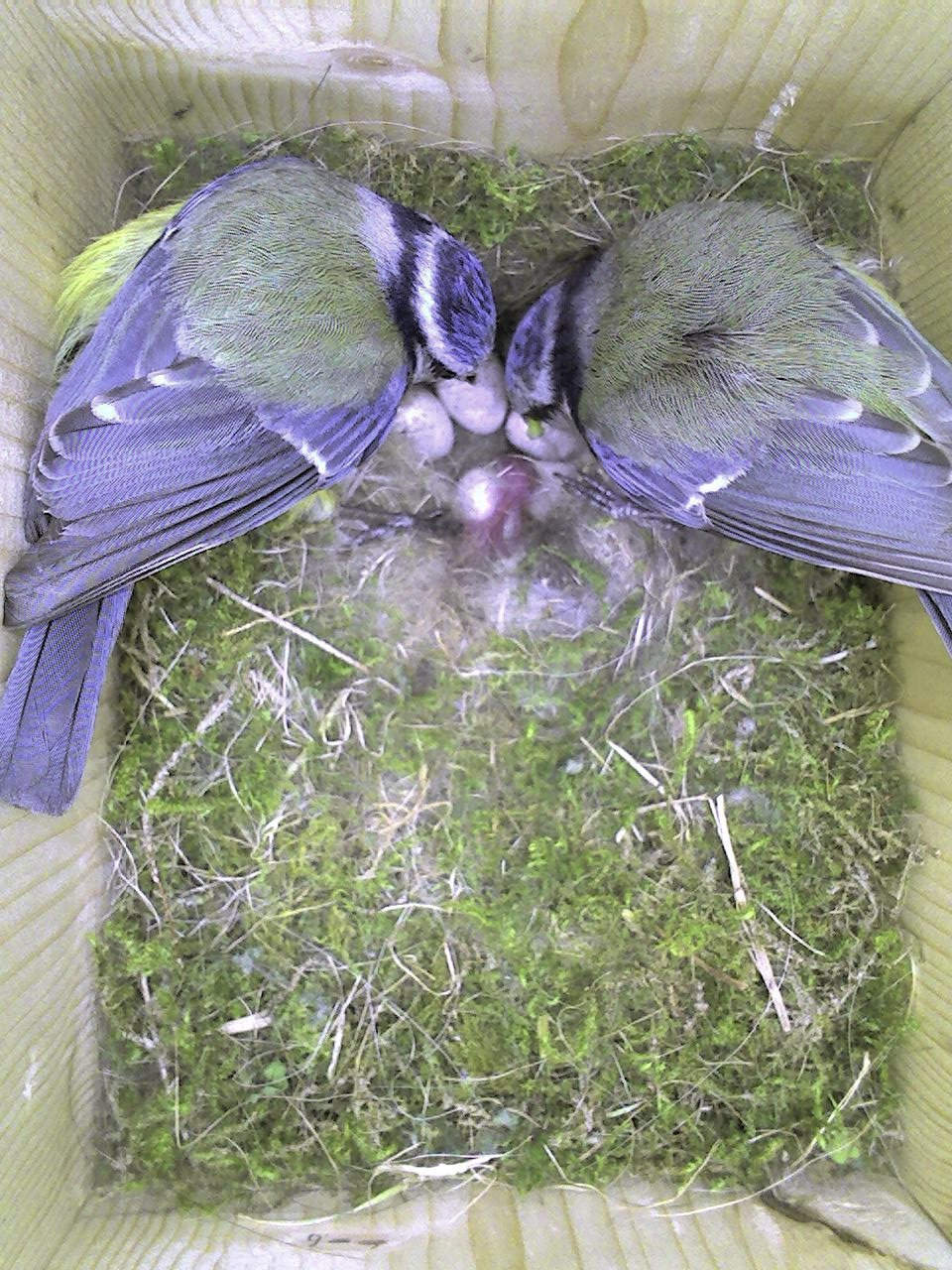
Ample greenery is visible in this blue tit (Cyanistes caeruleus) nest inside a nest box.

Species that reuse their nest annually are expected to benefit more from using ectoparasite-repellent greenery by warding off overwintering larvae which pose a greater threat to nestlings in spring. This was proven in a study performed on a variety of North American and European Falconiformes which found that species that made use of greenery were more often species that reuse their nests.

A subsequent study analysed the effectiveness of different plant species, found in and around European starling nests, at inhibiting bacterial growth in a nutrient medium and found that the plant species preferred by starlings were those with high bacterial inhibitory effectiveness. Furthermore, the behaviour was typically seen more in cavity nesters than in open-cup nesters which are expected to benefit more from sterilising their nest. This study, while providing evidence for NPH, stresses the use of greenery as a fumigant instead of an olfactory disruptor.

Another study on blue tits found that the collection of greenery was solely performed by the females during egg laying and chick stages, increasing the frequency of this behaviour over time, peaking when parasite load would be at its highest, providing evidence for the use of greenery specifically against parasitism.

== Alternative hypotheses ==
Despite the nest protection hypothesis’ prominence in the literature, multiple alternative hypotheses have been suggested over the years.

=== Mate hypothesis ===
The mate hypothesis suggests there is a courtship element involved in the collection and display of greenery. It has been observed that, in starlings, only males collect greenery and tend to do so during other courtship behaviours. Furthermore, the amount of greenery collected is found to be a function of the length of courtship, and males have been reported to carry greenery to the nest in an ‘eye catching manner’.

=== Drug hypothesis ===
The drug hypothesis suggests that greenery has a direct beneficial health benefit to chicks by potentiation of their immune system or similar mechanisms.

Evidence for this theory has been found in a study where aromatic herb species were artificially placed in starling nests. Chicks from nests which had aromatic herbs placed in them were found to be heavier and have a higher haematocrit despite there being no noticeable effect on parasite numbers.

However, the inverse has been found in other studies, where the presence of greenery did have an impact on parasite numbers but not on chick weight and leucocyte cell number, providing evidence for NPH over the drug hypothesis
