= EBR =

EBR may refer to:

== Places ==
- East Baton Rouge Parish, Louisiana, United States
- Edenbridge railway station, in England

== Military ==
=== Units ===
- East Bengal Regiment, Bangladesh

=== Equipment ===
- Mk 14 Enhanced Battle Rifle
- Panhard EBR, a light armoured car

== Other ==
- Eastern Bengal Railway of British India
- Ebrié language
- Electronic Book Review, a scholarly journal
- Emphasized Bible, a translation of the Bible
- Environmental Bill of Rights, in Ontario, Canada
- Erik Buell Racing, an American motorcycle company
- Extended boot record
- Experimental Breeder Reactor I, a decommissioned nuclear research reactor
- Electro-biochemical reactor
- European Business Register
- Evidence-based research
