= Microbial cell factory =

Schematic workflow for microbial factory optimization

Microbial cell factory is an approach to bioengineering which considers microbial cells as a production facility in which the optimization process largely depends on metabolic engineering. MCFs is a derivation of cell factories, which are engineered microbes and plant cells. In 1980s and 1990s, MCFs were originally conceived to improve productivity of cellular systems and metabolite yields through strain engineering. A MCF develops native and nonnative metabolites through targeted strain design. In addition, MCFs can shorten the synthesis cycle while reducing the difficulty of product separation.

== History ==
Prior to MCFs, scientists employed traditional engineering techniques to produce various commodities. These methodologies include modifying metabolic pathways, eliminating enzymes, or the balancing of ATP to drive metabolic flux. However, when these approaches were applied for industrial productions, they could not withstand the industrial environments that consisted of toxins and fluctuating temperatures. Ultimately, the techniques were never able to scale up and output bio-products that were obtained in the laboratory.

Thus, MCFs were developed by using a heterogenous biosynthesis pathway in a microbial host. As a host, MCFs take in various substrates and convert them into valuable compounds. These products can range from fuels, chemical, food ingredients, to pharmaceuticals.

== Structure ==
=== Cell Wall ===
In microbial cells, the cell walls are either Gram-positive or Gram-negative. These outcomes are based on the Gram Stain test. Gram-positive cell walls have thick peptidoglycan layer and no outer lipid membrane while Gram-negative bacteria have a thin peptidoglycan layer and an outer lipid membrane. Although a thick Gram-positive cell wall is advantageous, it is easier to attack as the peptidoglycan layer absorbs antibiotics and cleaning products. A Gram-negative cell wall is more resistant to such attacks and more difficult to destroy.

=== Membrane ===
The membrane of microbial cells are bilayers, composed of phospholipids. The phospholipids may range in chain length to branching. Ultimately, the phospholipid will determine the membrane properties, such as fluidity and charge, that will regulate the interactions with nearby proteins. In addition, the membrane oversees the development of the cell's morphology and cell sizes. Escherichia coli is often utilized a base line to differentiate and define the membrane of MCFs.

=== Nucleoid ===
The nucleoid forms an irregular shaped region within a prokaryote cell, containing all or majority of the genetic material to reproduce. The nucleoid controls the activity of the MCF and reproduction of itself and products.

== Current Developments ==
Current methods of programming MCFs utilize strain engineering, which rely on random mutagenesis. In addition, the conventional techniques are labor-intensive, timely, and difficult to analyze. This has led many scientific trials to utilize genomic editing tools to improve MCFs, such as ZFNs, TALENs, and CRISPR. These approaches allow genetic manipulation and analysis, specifically creating double stranded breaks within a genome sequence.

=== ZFNs ===
Zinc-finger nucleases (ZFNs) were the first genomic editing tool to be able to target any genomic site. By inducing a double-stranded break, ZFNs can facilitate targeted editing. However, when employed to reinforce MCFs, ZFNs have an unusual low success rate. In various trials, the ZFNs were unable to obtain a three-finger array or the triplet was unable to be assembled into a new sequence. Thus, incorporation of ZFNs into MCFs has remained strenuous and costly.

=== TALENs ===
Transcription activator-like effector nucleases (TALENs) work in a similar manner to ZFNs, but TALENs are based on fusion proteins. TALENs have been applied to numerous MCFs, such as yeast and zebrafish. Many developments has explored fairyTALE, a liquid phase synthesis TALEN platform, to create nucleases, activators, and repressors for MCFs. Although TALENs have fewer obstacles than ZFNs, they are still troublesome as assembling large quantities of repeats into an array remains a significant problem.

=== CRISPR ===
Clustered regularly interspaced palindromic repeats (CRISPR) and its associated proteins (Cas) has become one of the most popular genome editing tools due to its efficiency and low cost. The CRISPR/CAS9 has been utilized to enhance MCFs to produce yeast, bacteria, and E.coli. When optimizing yeast, CRISPR/CAS9 promoting S.pyogenes has been found to be the most influential strategy. For E.coli, studies have determined a strategy preventing genome instability to be the most robust metabolic engineering approach regardless of the specific methodology.

== Large-Scale Application ==
The most significant advantage of MCFs is the ability to be utilized in industrial environments with minimal limitations. Through metabolic engineering, MCFs rely on innovative strategic tools for the development and optimization of metabolic and gene regulatory networks for efficient production. Going from lab to large scale development involves consideration of three factors: product yield, productivity, and the product titre. A common dilemma however is the trade-off between product yield and productivity. If a company maximizes productivity, they will ultimately lower their product yield and vice versa.

To combat this issue, strategies have been developed to maximize all three factors. One of the most common techniques is utilizing fed-batch culture. Fed-batch culture is, in the broadest sense, defined as an operational technique in biotechnological processes where one or more nutrients (substrates) are fed (supplied) to the bioreactor during cultivation and in which the product(s) remain in the bioreactor until the end of the run. Another method is utilizing continuous cultivation strategy. The premise behind continuous cultivation is to maintain a steady-state cell metabolism over long periods of times. By having multiple approaches for MCF, companies may customize each process to their specific product(s).

== Commercialization ==
The commercialization of MCFs has ranged from chemical to biofuels.

Table 1: Commercialization of MCFs
Product	Production Organism	Status	Feed Stock	Companies	Reference
Chemical					
Acetone	Clostridium acetobuylicum	Commercialized	Corn	Green Biologics	www.greenbiologics.com
Citric Acid	Aspergillus niger	Commercialized			
Succinic Acid	E. coli	Commercialized	Corn Sugars	BioAmber	www.bio-amber.com
	E. coli	Commercialized	Sucrose	Myriant	www.myriant.com
	S. cerevisiae	Commercialized	Starch, sugars	Reverdia	www.reverdia.com
	B. succiniproducens	Commercialized	Glycerol, sugars	Succinity	www.succinity.com
Lactic Acid		Commercialized	Corn sugars and more	NatureWorks	www.natureworksllc.com
Itaconic Acid	Aspergillus terreus	Commercialized	Biochemistry	Qingdao Kehai	www.kehai.info/en
1,3-PDO	E. coli	Commercialized	Corn Sugars	DuPont Tate & Lyle	www.duponttateandlyle.com
1,3-BDO		Demonstrated		Genomatica and Versalis	www.genomatica.com
1,4-BDO	E.coli	Commercialized	Sugar	Genomatica and DuPont Tate & Lyle	www.genomatica.com
1,5-PDA		Commercialized	Sugar	Cathay Industrial Biotech	www.cathaybiotech.com
3-HP		Commercialized		Metabolix	www.metabolix.com
		Demonstration		Novozymes and Cargill	www.novozymes.com
Isoprene	S. cerevisiae	Preparing	Sugar, cellulose	Amyris, Braskem, Michelin	www.amyris.com
		Preparing		DuPont, Goodyear	www.biosciences.dupont.com
Isobutene	E. coli	Demonstration	Glucose, sucrose	Global Bioenergies	www.global-bioenergies.com
Adipic acid	Candida sp.	Demonstration	Plant oils	Verdezyne	www.verdezyne.com
Sebacic acid	Candida sp.	Demonstration	Plant oils	Verdezyne	www.verdezyne.com
DDDA	Candida sp.	Under commercialization	Plant oils	Verdezyne	www.verdezyne.com
Squalene	S. cerevisiae	Commercialized	Sugarcane	Amyris	www.amyris.com
PHA	E. coli	Commercialized		Metabolix	www.metabolix.com
Fuels					
Ethanol	S. cerevisiae, Zymomonas mobilis, Kluyveromyces marxianus	Commercialized	Sugarcane, corn sugar, lignocellulose	Many	
	Clostridium autoethanogenum	Demonstration	Flue gas	Lanzatech	www.lazatech.com
Farnesene	S. cerevisiae	Commercialized		Amyris	www.amyris.com
Butanol	Clostridium acetobuylicum	Commercialized	Corn	Green Biologics	www.greenbiologics.com
Isobutanol	Yeast	Commercialized	Sugars	Gevo	www.gevo.com
