= Newton number =

Newton number may refer to:

- The kissing number in the sphere packing problem
- The power number N_{p} in Physics as a dimensionless number relating the resistance force to the inertia force.
