= Bioprocessor =

A bioprocessor is a miniaturized bioreactor capable of culturing mammalian, insect and microbial cells. Bioprocessors are capable of mimicking performance of large-scale bioreactors, hence making them ideal for laboratory scale experimentation of cell culture processes. Bioprocessors are also used for concentrating bioparticles (such as cells) in bioanalytical systems. Microfluidic processes such as electrophoresis can be implemented by bioprocessors to aid in DNA isolation and purification.
