= Insect cell culture =

The use of insect cell lines as production hosts is an emerging technology in the production of bio pharmaceuticals. More than 100 insect cell lines are currently available for recombinant protein production, with lines derived from Bombyx mori, Mamestra brassicae, Spodoptera frugiperda, Trichoplusia ni, and Drosophila melanogaster being of particular interest. Insects cell lines are commonly used in place of prokaryotic ones because post-translational modifications of proteins are possible in insect cells whereas this mechanism is not present in prokaryotic systems. The Sf9 cell line is one of the most commonly used lines in insect cell culture.
