= Electro-biochemical reactor =

Bioreactor used in water treatment

Electro-biochemical reactor (EBR) is a type of a bioreactor used in water treatment. EBR is a high-efficiency denitrification, metals, and inorganics removal technology that provides electrons directly to the EBR bioreactor as a substitute for using excess electron donors and nutrients. It was patented by INOTEC, a bioremediation company based in Salt Lake City, UT.

The EBR technology is based on the principle that microbes mediate the removal of metal and inorganic contaminants through electron transfer (redox processes). In conventional bioreactors, these electrons are provided by excess organic electron donors (e.g., organic carbon sources such as methanol, glucose, etc.). They require excess nutrients/chemicals to compensate for inefficient and variable electron availability needed to adjust reactor ORP chemistry, compensate for system sensitivity (fluctuation), and to achieve more consistent constituent removal. The Electro-Biochemical Reactor directly supplies needed electrons to the reactor and microbes, using a low applied potential across the reactor cell (1-3 V) at low milli-Amp levels. As a comparison, one molecule of glucose, often used as a cost-effective electron donor, can provide up to 24 electrons under complete glucose metabolism, while a current of 1 mA provides 6.2x10^15 electrons every second. The small amount of power required can even come from a small solar/battery source.

The EBR systems have been successfully demonstrated in the mining and power generation sectors to remove nitrate, nitrite, selenium, cadmium, molybdenum, nickel, tin, uranium, zinc, antimony, copper, lead, silver, vanadium, and mercury.
