= Turbidostat =

Device used to regulate turbidity of microbial cultures

A turbidostat is a continuous microbiological culture device, similar to a chemostat or an auxostat, which has feedback between the turbidity of the culture vessel and the dilution rate. The theoretical relationship between growth in a chemostat and growth in a turbidostat is somewhat complex, in part because they are similar. A chemostat has a fixed volume and flow rate, and thus a fixed dilution rate. A turbidostat dynamically adjusts the flow rate (and therefore the dilution rate) to make the turbidity constant. At steady state, operation of both the chemostat and turbidostat are identical. It is only when classical chemostat assumptions are violated (for instance, out of equilibrium; or the cells are mutating) that a turbidostat is functionally different. One case may be while cells are growing at their maximum growth rate, in which case it is difficult to set a chemostat to the appropriate constant dilution rate.

While most turbidostats use a spectrophotometer/turbidimeter to measure the optical density for control purposes, there exist other methods, such as dielectric permittivity.

The morbidostat is a similar device built to study the evolution of antimicrobial resistance. The aim is also to maintain constant turbidity levels, but this is controlled using the addition of antimicrobials.
