= Power number =

Dimensionless number in fluid mechanics

The power number N_{p} (also known as Newton number) is a commonly used dimensionless number relating the resistance force to the inertia force.

The power-number has different specifications according to the field of application. E.g., for stirrers the power number is defined as:

$$N_\mathrm{p} = \frac{P}{\rho n^{3} D^{5}}$$

with

- P: power
- ρ: fluid density
- n: rotational speed in revolutions per second
- D: diameter of stirrer
