= Fed-batch culture =

Operational technique in biotechnological processes

Fed-batch bioreactor symbol

A fed‑batch culture is, in the broadest sense, defined as a bioprocessing operation in which one or more nutrients (substrates) are supplied to the bioreactor during cultivation of microorganisms or animal cells, while no culture broth (cells and medium) is taken out until the final harvest. An alternative description of the method is that of a culture in which "a base medium supports initial cell culture and a feed medium is added to prevent nutrient depletion". In some fed‑batch cultures, the entire culture medium or a precursor of the target metabolite serves as the feed substrate. It is also called semi-batch culture.
While the term "semi-batch" is well-established in the field of chemical reaction engineering, "fed-batch" is considered the most appropriate term for microbial reactions, as the supplied substrates are typically nutrients consumed by the microorganisms. Indeed, this terminology is widely adopted in numerous English-language research papers and reviews. In modern bioprocess engineering, batch, fed-batch, and continuous cultures are typically described as the three fundamental modes of cultivation. Given these characteristics, fed-batch culture is essentially a variant of batch culture.
The advantage of the fed-batch culture is that one can control concentration of fed-substrate in the culture liquid at arbitrarily desired levels (in many cases, at low levels).
Generally speaking, fed-batch culture is superior to conventional batch culture when controlling concentrations of a nutrient (or nutrients) affects the yield or productivity of the desired metabolite. In other words, the primary advantage of fed-batch culture is the ability to arbitrarily control the concentration of the fed substrate within the culture broth. In batch culture, all necessary medium components are added at the outset, leaving their concentrations uncontrolled and subject to only the metabolic activity of the microorganisms. In contrast, fed-batch culture allows for the gradual supply of substrates, enabling the optimal maintenance of concentrations—most often at low levels—according to the specific objectives of the process. Meanwhile, in continuous culture (chemostat), all medium components, including the growth-limiting substrate, are maintained at constant values. Therefore, from the perspective of environmental control, fed-batch culture can be positioned as an intermediate between batch and continuous cultivations. Currently, due to risks such as bacterial or phage contamination and genetic mutation, industrial-scale continuous culture is restricted to a limited number of specific fermentations. Consequently, fed-batch culture is increasingly emphasized as an essential improvement over traditional batch culture.
In industrial fed-batch processes, the specific substrates used and the feeding strategies employed are often treated as highly confidential proprietary know-how. Consequently, while it is difficult to obtain detailed information on industrial applications, a significant number of commercial fermentations are being conducted using this method.

== History ==
The technical term "Fed-batch" first appeared in the title of an original research paper in 1973. While Reference [4] is a monograph covering microbial and cell culture in general, Chapter 21 is dedicated to fed-batch cultivation. However, the discussion therein is limited to constant fed-batch culture (described later), where the substrate concentration in the feed is equal to the initial substrate concentration of the batch culture. This results in a significant increase in the culture volume within the bioreactor, making it less representative of discussions regarding industrial fed-batch processes. Reference [1] is a review published in 1984, and Reference [5] is a monograph published in 2013.; both provide a comprehensive overview of the literature related to fed-batch cultivation up to their respective years of publication.
In practice, however, this method was implemented much earlier than its formal naming. The oldest and best-known example of this fermentation process or operation is in baker's yeast production. To minimize the formation of ethanol (a byproduct) and maximize the yeast yield on sugar, molasses is added intermittently and sequentially to maintain a low sugar concentration. A German patent for this method was filed in 1917 and published in 1919, shortly after World War I. Furthermore, a patent for an improved fed-batch method for baker's yeast was accepted in 1933. Since then, this process has been known in Germany as "Zulaufverfahren". The production of baker's yeast via the fed-batch method has since undergone various improvements, and remains an industrially vital fed-batch fermentation process.
Historically, the next application appeared in penicillin fermentation, which involves the sequential addition of energy sources (e.g., glucose) and penicillin precursors (e.g., phenylacetic acid).
Subsequently, in the field of amino acid fermentation—an industry pioneered by Japan starting with glutamate fermentation in 1956—the fed-batch method was adopted for the production of several amino acids (e.g., Reference).
Furthermore, following the development of genetic engineering, the fed-batch method was adopted for the high-density cultivation of recombinants (primarily Escherichia coli). It has also been applied to heterologous protein production using recombinant yeast.
More recently, the method has been utilized in the manufacture of antibody drugs via high-density liquid cultivation of animal cells, primarily Chinese Hamster Ovary (CHO) cells.

== Cases where fed-batch cultures are advantageous ==
The types of bioprocesses for which fed-batch culture is effective can be summarized as follows:

=== Substrate inhibition ===
Nutrients such as methanol, ethanol, acetic acid, and aromatic compounds inhibit the growth of microorganisms even at relatively low concentrations. By adding such substrates properly lag-time can be shortened and the inhibition of the cell growth markedly reduced.

=== High cell density (High cell concentration) ===
In a batch culture, to achieve very high cell concentrations, e.g. 50-100 g of dry cells/L, high initial concentrations of the nutrients in the medium are needed. At such high concentrations, the nutrients become inhibitory, even though they have no such effect at the normal concentrations used in batch cultures.
The fed-batch strategy is typically used in bio-industrial processes to reach a high cell density in the bioreactor. Mostly the feed solution is highly concentrated to avoid dilution of the bioreactor. Production of heterologous proteins by fed-batch cultures of recombinant microorganisms have been extensively studied.

The controlled addition of the nutrient directly affects the growth rate of the culture and helps to avoid overflow metabolism (formation of side metabolites, such as acetate for Escherichia coli, lactic acid in mammalian cell cultures, ethanol in Saccharomyces cerevisiae), oxygen limitation (anaerobiosis).

=== Glucose effect (Crabtree effect) ===
In the production of baker's yeast from malt wort or molasses it has been recognized since early 1900s that ethanol is produced even in the presence of sufficient dissolved oxygen (DO) if an excess of sugar is present in the culture liquid. Ethanol is a main cause of low cell yield. Aerobic ethanol formation in the presence of glucose concentration is known as glucose effect or Crabtree effect. To reduce this effect, a fed-batch process is generally employed for baker's yeast production. In aerobic cultures of Escherichia coli and Bacillus subtilis, organic acids such as acetic acid, (and in lesser amounts, lactic acid and formic acid), are produced as byproducts when sugar concentration is high, and these acids inhibit cell growth as well as show deteriorating effect on the metabolic activities. The formation of these acids are called bacterial Crabtree effects.

=== Catabolite repression ===
When a microorganism is provided with a rapidly metabolizable carbon-energy source such as glucose, the resulting increase in the intracellular concentration of ATP leads to the repression of enzyme(s) biosynthesis, thus causing a slower metabolization of the energy source. This phenomenon is known as catabolite repression. Many enzymes, especially those involved in catabolic pathways, are subject to this repressive regulation. A powerful method of overcoming the catabolite repression in the enzyme biosynthesis is a fed-batch culture in which glucose concentration in the culture liquid is kept low, where growth is restricted, and the enzyme biosynthesis is derepressed. Slow feeding of glucose in penicillin fermentation by Penicillium chrysogenum is a classical example in the category.

=== Auxotrophic mutants ===
In a microbial process employing an auxotrophic mutant (nutritionally requiring mutant), excess supply of the required nutrient results in abundant cell growth with little accumulation of the desired metabolite due to feedback inhibition and /or end-product repression. Starvation of the required nutrient, however, lowers cell growth as well as the overall production of the desired metabolite, as the production rate is usually proportional to the cell concentration. In such a bioprocess, the accumulation of the desired metabolite can be maximized by growing the mutant on a limited amount of the required nutrient. To cultivate the mutant on a low concentration of the required nutrient, it is fed to the batch culture at a controlled rate. This technique is often used in industrial amino acid productions with the auxotrophic mutants. An example is lysine production with homoserine- or threonine/methionine-requiring mutant of Corynebacterium glutamicum being lacking for homoserine dehydrogenase gene.

=== Expression control of a gene with a repressible promoter ===
Transcription of a gene having a repressible promoter upstream of the open reading frame is repressed by combination of the so-called holo-repressor with the operator region on the DNA. When a specified chemical compound exists in the culture liquid, the compound (or its metabolite) in the cells combines as co-repressor with an apo-repressor (a kind of transcription factor) to form the holo-repressor. Keeping the concentration of this compound as low as possible (while still allowing for sufficient cell growth) permits continued expression of the regulated gene. Fed-batch culture is a powerful technique to do so. Examples of the repressible promoter are trp promoter and phoA promoter.

== Classification ==
In fed-batch culture, the feeding of a substrate (solution) results in a more or less significant increase in the volume of the culture broth within the bioreactor. These fed-batch cultures are broadly classified into two categories based on whether the volume increase is negligible or significant. The former is defined as constant-volume fed-batch culture, while the latter is distinguished as variable-volume fed-batch culture.
Constant-volume fed-batch culture typically involves the feeding of liquid substrates (such as methanol, ethanol, or glycerol), powdered glucose, or highly concentrated substrate solutions; the variable-volume type encompasses all other cases. When an aqueous substrate solution is fed, water is introduced alongside the substrate. From a practical standpoint, however, the feeding of water offers no benefit, as it merely dilutes the broth and increases the total volume in the bioreactor. Therefore, to ensure ease of operation and analysis, it is preferable to feed the most concentrated solution possible.

Since the essence of fed-batch culture lies in controlling the concentration of the fed substrate, the central challenges are what to feed and how to feed it. The latter also includes the critical decision of when to initiate the feeding process. Determining the "what" requires expertise in biosciences, such as microbial physiology, microbial genetics, biochemistry, and molecular biology. Conversely, the "how" falls within the domain of engineering. Fed-batch cultures can be further classified based on the feeding strategy, as summarized in the table below.

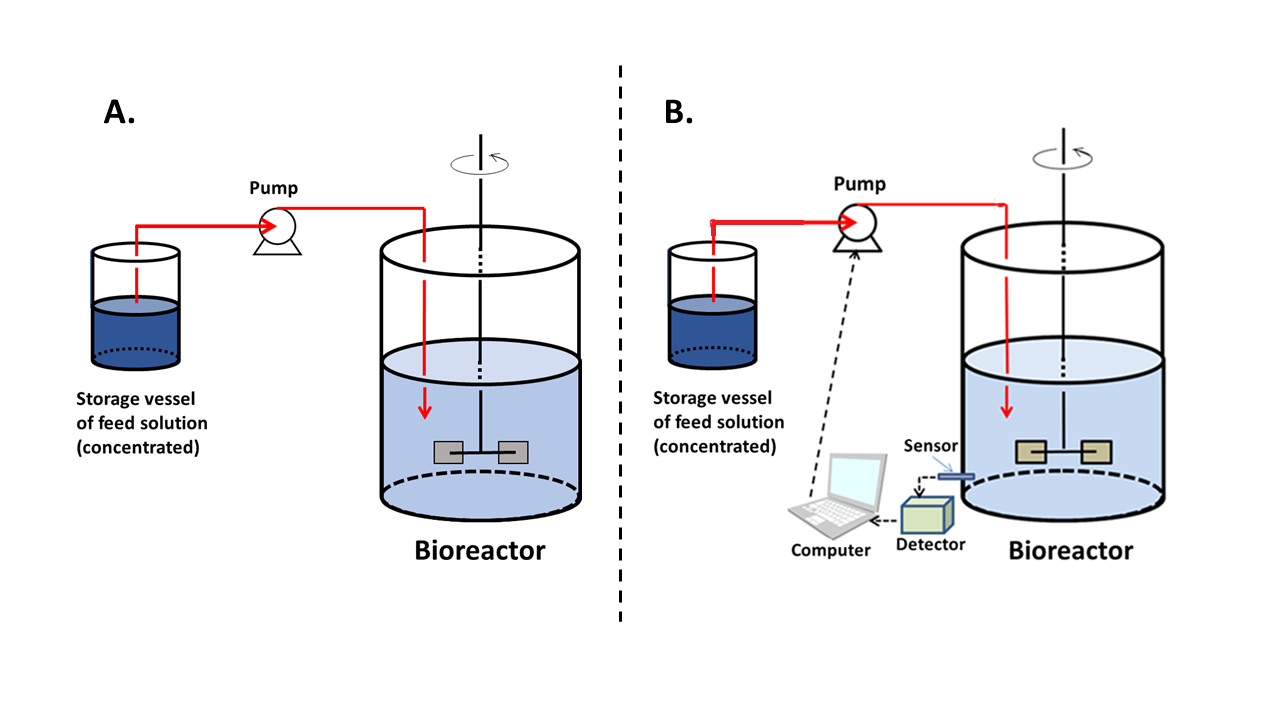
A. Fed-batch culture without feedback control; B. Fed-batch culture with feedback control (A system may not have only one sensor. It can also input information from multiple sensors into the computer.)

From the engineering viewpoint, fed‑batch cultures are subclassified into two categories: fed‑batch cultures without feedback control and those with feedback control.
In earlier times, feeding was done manually, but nowadays it is automated with the aid of a computer (automatic fed‑batch culture).
Classification of fed-batch culture is summarized in the table below.
Furthermore, an operation method in which a portion of the culture broth is retained at harvest time to serve as the inoculum for the subsequent fed-batch run within the same bioreactor is referred to as repeated fed-batch culture (fermentation).

Table. Classification of fed-batch culture (with some additions from Reference [1])
Primary category	Subcategory 1	Subcategory 2
(1) Fed-batch culture without feedback control	1.1 Constant Fed-batch culture; 1.2 Exponential fed-batch culture; 1.3 Optimized fed-batch culture (Maximum Principle, Dynamic Programming etc.); 1.4 Intermittent addition	
(2) Fed-batch culture with feedback control	2.1 Direct: The measured concentration of the fed substrate in the culture broth is used directly as the control index. (Examples: volatile alcohols, glucose, acetate, ammonium ion, etc.); 2.2 Indirect: The observable parameters that are closely related to the bioreaction are used as control indices.; (As Parmeter(s) there are DO, OUR, pH, qo_{2}, RQ, turbidity, amount of added ammonia, partial pressure of CO_{2} in the exhaust gas, etc.)	2.a Set-pint control (ON-OFF control or PID control); 2.b Programed control; 2.c Optimal control; 2.d Intelligent controls (Fuzzy control, Artificial Neural Network, Expert system, etc.); 2.e AI-based optimal controls

== Fed-batch culture without feedback control ==
The feeding mode is also known as feedforward, or open‑loop control, and can be subdivided into several categories.

=== Constant fed-batch culture ===
The simplest fed-batch culture is the one in which the feed rate of a growth-limiting substrate is constant, i.e. the feed rate is invariant during the culture. This case is shown in the graph (here the culture volume is variable).

The graph shows the principle of a substrate limited fed-batch cultivation with an initial batch phase. After consumption of the initial substrate a continuous feed of this substrate is started. The aqueous substrate solution is fed with unvaried feed rate, i.e. an example of constant fed-batch culture.

This type of the fed-batch culture is named constant-fed-batch culture (CFBC), and is well established mathematically and experimentally. In the CFBC, both cases of fixed-volume CFBC and variable-volume CFBC were studied.

=== Exponential fed-batch culture ===
Under ideal condition, cells grow exponentially. If the feed rate of the growth-limiting substrate is increased in proportion to the exponential growth rate of the cells, it is possible to maintain the cells' specific growth rate for a long time while keeping the substrate concentration in the culture liquid at a constant level. The required feed rate (volumetric or mass) must be increased exponentially with time.This type of fed-batch operation is designated as exponential fed-batch culture (EFBC); the first mathematical analyses and experimental research reports on this method were published in 1974.
The origins of this feeding strategy can be traced back to baker's yeast cultivation, where the required amount of molasses was calculated and added based on the amount of biomass produced during a specific time interval.
This method is particularly suitable for obtaining the maximum possible biomass in the shortest time when using substrates—such as methanol—that exhibit an extended lag phase and a reduced growth rate at high concentrations.
Generally, to maximize the production of intracellular substances in the shortest possible timeframe, it is necessary to perform EFBC at a growth rate near the maximum specific growth rate to increase the final cell concentration as much as possible.

Substrate limitation offers the possibility to control the reaction rates to avoid technological limitations connected to the cooling of the reactor and oxygen transfer. Substrate limitation also allows the metabolic control, to avoid osmotic effects, catabolite repression and overflow metabolism of side products.

=== Optimized fed-batch culture ===
While the two aforementioned fed-batch methods are significant as fundamental approaches, the feeding rate should be varied optimally according to the specific objective when producing extracellular metabolites. Fed-batch culture optimized in this manner is referred to as optimized fed-batch culture (or optimized fed-batch fermentation). Although various research studies have addressed this type of fed-batch method, information regarding its industrial implementation remains limited.
Reference [32] demonstrates that when the specific production rate of a target metabolite is expressed as a function of the specific growth rate of the microorganism, the optimal solution for the specific growth rate can be obtained based on Pontryagin’s Maximum Principle, using maximum yield or maximum productivity as the objective function; subsequently, the optimal temporal profile of the feeding rate can be derived.

== Fed-batch culture with feedback control ==
In feeding systems where substrates are added according to a predetermined schedule, it is difficult to respond to unfavorable states that may arise during fermentation. Consequently, it is natural to seek some form of feedback control whenever possible. In certain cases, this is performed manually by on-site technicians.
The feeding system is otherwise known as ‘closed-loop controlled fed-batch culture.’
Fed-batch fermentation involving feedback control can be classified into direct and indirect methods from a control systems perspective. Furthermore, based on the concentration of the fed substrate, they can be categorized into set-point control (maintaining a constant value) and programmed control (varying the concentration over time). The latter assumes scenarios such as maintaining a high concentration during the initial stage of fermentation and a low concentration during the latter stage.
Different strategies can be used to control the growth in a fed-batch process.

=== Direct Feedback Control ===
This method involves the continuous or intermittent measurement of the fed substrate concentration within the culture broth to use as a control indicator. An automatically direct feedback controlled fed-batch culture of the yeast Pichia farinosa IFO 0602 was reported using ethanol as the carbon-energy source. A microporous Teflon membrane tube sensor was utilized to continuously measure dissolved ethanol in the culture broth. If a substrate is volatile and its partial pressure in the exhaust gas is in equilibrium with its concentration in the liquid, the partial pressure of the gas immediately after exiting the broth can serve as the control indicator.
Ammonium salts, such as ammonium sulfate, are commonly used as inorganic nitrogen sources. However, high concentrations of ammonium ions inhibit the growth of microbial and animal cells, reduce metabolic activity, and suppress the biosynthesis of enzymes. To avoid these effects, it is desirable to feed the nitrogen source to maintain a low ammonium ion concentration, [NH_{4}^{+}].In aqueous solution, an equilibrium exists between [NH_{4}^{+}] and ammonia ([NH_{3}]); at pH 7 or below, nearly all exists as [NH_{4}^{+}], while at pH 11 or above, it exists almost entirely as [NH_{3}]. Leveraging this, researchers studied a quasi-direct feedback control system where a small amount of culture broth is continuously sampled and led to a sealed vessel (at pH 11.0–11.5) equipped with an ammonia gas electrode. The concentration is measured as [NH_{3}] to maintain a constant [NH_{4}^{+}] level in the culture. This direct feedback control of [NH_{4}^{+}] has been applied to E. coli and yeast cultures with high performance .

=== Indirect Feedback Control ===
This method uses observable parameters closely related to the process as control indicators. Reported indicators include dissolved oxygen (DO), respiration rate, CO_{2} partial pressure in exhaust gas, respiratory quotient (RQ), pH, metabolites, turbidity, and fluorescence.
DO-based Control method (DO-stat fed-batch culture), utilizing DO exploits the phenomenon where DO rises when the substrate concentration falls below a critical value and decreases when the substrate exceeds a certain level. As the culture progresses and cell concentration increases, oxygen demand also rises. Therefore, the volumetric oxygen transfer coefficient (k_{L}a) must be increased—either by increasing the aeration rate and agitation speed or by supplementing the air with pure oxygen to increase the driving force to enhance the oxygen transfer rate. Historically, feeding was often performed in an ON/OFF manner, frequently exposing the microorganisms to alternating states of semi-starvation and substrate sufficiency. Such conventional DO-stat methods were limited by extremely low DO values and significant fluctuations. Recently, Horiuchi et al. experimentally demonstrated that PID control at higher DO levels (5–40% air saturation) enables set-point control with minimal fluctuations. The three parameters for PID control were determined using the Ziegler-Nichols method. Using this PID-controlled DO-stat method, they successfully performed a 50-hour fed-batch culture of recombinant E. coli, achieving high-concentration production (total concentration 2.8–3.0 g/L) of single-chain variable fragments (scFv) of antibody.
The partial pressure (concentration) of CO_{2} in exhaust gas can be easily monitored using an infrared CO_{2} gas analyzer (industrial dual-beam CO_{2} sensor), which poses no risk of contamination to the bioreactor. This is also applied to the feeding of substrates that induce pH changes, such as acetic acid. This control method is particularly advantageous when using synthetic media composed mainly of inorganic salts. Since the CO_{2} concentration in the exhaust gas (more accurately, the product of CO_{2} concentration and exhaust gas flow rate) is generally proportional to the total biomass in the culture, this variable can be utilized for the automated control of feeding .
Respiratory Quotient(RQ) Control methods using RQ as a control indicator have been proposed for baker's yeast production. By measuring the carbon dioxide evolution rate and oxygen uptake rate, the RQ is maintained at a level slightly above 1.0. This keeps sugar concentrations low and, consequently, reduces the production of ethanol as a byproduct. The partial pressures of O_{2} and CO_{2} at the fermentor inlet and outlet are accurately measured and input into a computer, which calculates the RQ from mass balance equations to control the feeding of molasses.
The pH-stat method (pH-stat fed-batch culture) utilizes the phenomenon where the pH of the culture medium deviates from a set point [35][36][37]. In automated pH control, a pH electrode is inserted into the culture, and upper and lower limits are established via an external pH controller. As medium components are consumed during fermentation, alkali is added if the pH falls below the lower limit, and acid is added if it rises above the upper limit. If the culture tends toward acidification, the feeding of the substrate is synchronized with the addition of alkali; if it tends toward alkalization, feeding is linked to the addition of acid.
Metabolite concentration control is used when the metabolite is a byproduct whose production should be minimized, such as ethanol in baker's yeast production. Instead of direct measurement in the culture broth, the ethanol concentration in the exhaust gas may be measured.
Control based on turbidity utilizes online sensors that continuously measure the optical density of the culture (which is nearly proportional to cell concentration for unicellular microorganisms). In aerobic fermentation, online turbidity sensors inevitably encounter noise caused by air bubbles. Therefore, statistical processing, such as the sequential calculation of moving averages, is required.
Regardless of the type of feedback control applied, the critical factors remain: what information is input into the computer, how that data is processed, and what software is utilized to optimize the substrate feeding.

== Intelligent approaches to fed-batch culture ==
The primary objective of fed-batch cultivation is to increase the amount of product obtained from a single cultivation run. Accordingly, it is desirable to optimize the feeding strategy by extending the production period and/or increasing the production rate. However, biological reactions are highly complex, making it difficult to describe them adequately using simple mathematical models for detailed analysis and optimization. Thus, approaches commonly used for chemical processes, in which simulation and optimization are performed based on mathematical models, are often impractical for microbial cultivation. Consequently, optimal feeding strategies have traditionally been determined through trial and error, based on various fed-batch strategies described above, including constant-rate and exponential feeding. Nevertheless, approaches known as intelligent control have also been reported to be effective for optimizing feeding strategies.

=== Statistical Data-Based Approaches ===
One approach is to collect extensive time-course data from cultivation experiments and use the trends observed in these data for simulation and optimization. For example, statistical relationships can be established between microbial parameters, such as the specific growth, substrate consumption, and product formation rates, and state variables, such as biomass and substrate concentrations. These relationships can then be incorporated into differential equations describing changes in the state variables and used for simulation and optimization. This approach was applied to a system for glutamic acid production in which ethanol was used as the carbon source and supplied by fed-batch feeding, and its effectiveness was demonstrated.

=== Fuzzy Control-Based Approaches ===
Fuzzy control has been investigated as a means of incorporating empirical rules and know-how acquired from numerous cultivation experiments. Two general approaches can be distinguished. In the first, the feeding operation itself is directly controlled using fuzzy inference. In the second, fuzzy inference is first used to identify the cultivation state or phase, after which the feeding strategy is selected according to the identified state; in this case, fuzzy inference is used indirectly. An example of the latter approach has been reported for vitamin B2 production.

=== Traditional rule-based expert systems ===
In most cultivation processes, the components that need to be supplied during feeding are limited mainly to carbon sources and related nutrients. However, when high cell densities or high product concentrations are targeted, several additional substrates besides the carbon source may need to be supplied during cultivation. Furthermore, components such as inorganic salts, which are prone to precipitation, may need to be added sequentially. Expert systems have therefore been applied to support fed-batch cultivation. In one such approach, the biomass concentration is compared with the cumulative amount of inorganic salts added up to that point, and the required amount is estimated from this comparison and added online. This approach successfully supported the fed-batch operation and enabled the cultivation of cells at high density.

=== Generative AI and other learning-based approaches ===
In recent years, generative artificial intelligence (AI), machine learning (ML), reinforcement learning (RL), and related approaches have increasingly been applied to the optimization of fed-batch cultures. Generative AI, including large language models (LLMs), can infer qualitative culture conditions from the literature and experimental data, such as appropriate feed components and the rationale for their use, and can in some cases provide approximate quantitative information, including feasible feeding-rate ranges. ML and RL can further utilize experimental, simulated, or virtual culture data to develop predictive models and efficiently identify optimal operating strategies. Bayesian optimization has also been investigated for online optimization by incorporating the evolving state of the culture during cultivation.

However, the effectiveness of these AI-based approaches has been demonstrated primarily through simulations, and their performance in actual cultivation processes, particularly at industrial scale, remains insufficiently validated. Furthermore, their application to regulated biomanufacturing requires process decisions, including feeding operations, to be explainable, traceable, and accountable in accordance with requirements such as Good Manufacturing Practice (GMP).

== Start-up ==
The key principle of fed-batch culture lies in the precise control of the substrate concentration within the culture medium; therefore, an excessive amount of substrate must not be present at the onset of the feeding process. However, as batch fermentation typically involves an initial lag phase, a certain minimum amount of substrate is necessary to shorten this period. It is therefore usual to initially provide a limited amount of substrate and conduct batch operation until the cells reach an active growth state; the feeding operation then is initiated once the substrate concentration has decreased.
For substrates directly involved in energy production and growth, such as glucose, continuous monitoring of dissolved oxygen (DO) is effective. In this case, feeding commences during the batch phase at the point when the substrate is nearly exhausted, signaled by a rapid increase (spike) in the DO level. In contrast, when feeding compounds such as precursors for secondary metabolites that are not directly related to energy production or growth, the optimal timing for the start of feeding is determined either experimentally or through mathematical modeling.

== Scale-up ==
Scale-up is a methodology for implementing results obtained at the laboratory scale within industrial-scale equipment. While this is rarely an issue in laboratory-scale bioreactors, in industrial vessels ranging from 10 to 10^{2}m^{3}, it is not necessarily guaranteed that the fed substrate solution emerging from the inlet will be rapidly mixed to achieve complete homogeneity throughout the culture broth. Specifically, because a concentrated substrate is introduced while the overall concentration in the vessel remains on the order of 10 to 100 mg/L, spatial distributions and temporal fluctuations in concentration occur. Depending on the mixing time, high-concentration regions coexist with areas where the substrate is nearly depleted. This overall heterogeneity impacts both biomass yield and metabolite productivity.
