= Auxostat =

Auxostat example

An auxostat is a continuous culture device which, while in operation, uses feedback from a measurement taken on the growth chamber to control the media flow rate, maintaining the measurement at a constant.

Auxo was the Greek goddess of spring growth, and represents nutrients as a prefix. However, the most typical auxostats are pH-auxostats, with feedback between the growth rate and a pH meter.

Other auxostats may measure oxygen tension, ethanol concentrations, and sugar concentrations
