= Bioreactor =

System that supports a biologically active environment

A bioreactor is any manufactured device or system that supports a biologically active environment. In one case, a bioreactor is a vessel in which a chemical process is carried out which involves organisms or biochemically active substances derived from such organisms. This process can either be aerobic or anaerobic. These bioreactors are commonly cylindrical, ranging in size from litres to cubic metres, and are often made of stainless steel.

It may also refer to a device or system designed to grow cells or tissues in the context of cell culture. These devices are being developed for use in tissue engineering or biochemical/bioprocess engineering.

General structure of a continuous stirred-tank type bioreactor

On the basis of mode of operation, a bioreactor may be classified as batch, fed batch or continuous (e.g. a continuous stirred-tank reactor model). An example of a continuous bioreactor is the chemostat.

Organisms or biochemically active substances growing in bioreactors may be submerged in liquid medium or may be anchored to the surface of a solid medium. Submerged cultures may be suspended or immobilized. Suspension bioreactors may support a wider variety of organisms, since special attachment surfaces are not needed, and can operate at a much larger scale than immobilized cultures. However, in a continuously operated process the organisms will be removed from the reactor with the effluent. Immobilization is a general term describing a wide variety of methods for cell or particle attachment or entrapment. It can be applied to basically all types of biocatalysis including enzymes, cellular organelles, animal and plant cells and organs. Immobilization is useful for continuously operated processes, since the organisms will not be removed with the reactor effluent, but is limited in scale because the microbes are only present on the surfaces of the vessel.

Large scale immobilized cell bioreactors are:

- moving media, also known as moving bed biofilm reactor (MBBR)
- packed bed
- fibrous bed
- membrane

== Design ==
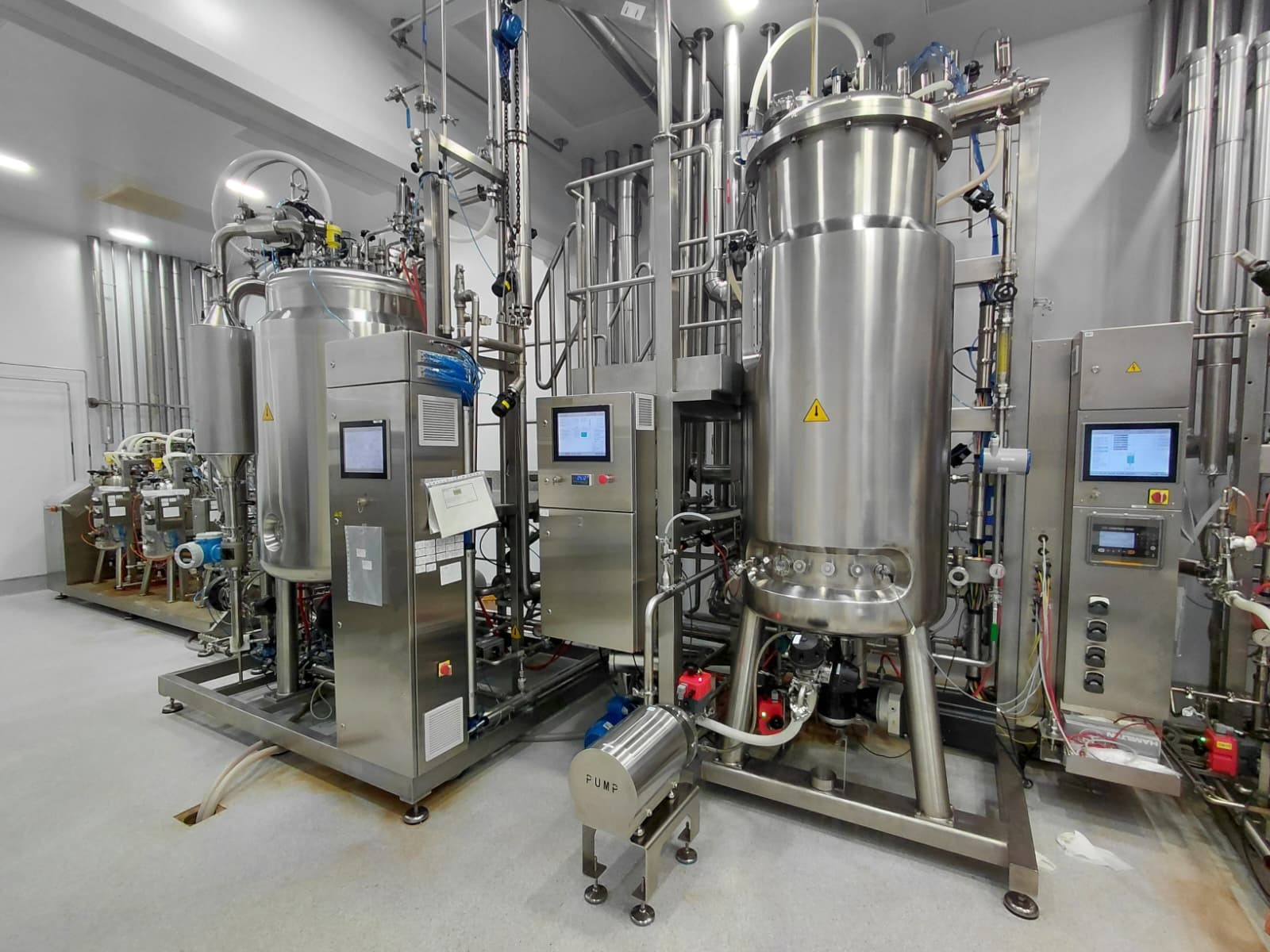
A stainless-steel industrial bioreactor installed in a veterinary vaccine production facility.

Bioreactor design is a relatively complex engineering task, which is studied in the discipline of biochemical/bioprocess engineering. Under optimum conditions, the microorganisms or cells are able to perform their desired function with limited production of impurities. The environmental conditions inside the bioreactor, such as temperature, nutrient concentrations, pH, and dissolved gases (especially oxygen for aerobic fermentations) affect the growth and productivity of the organisms. The temperature of the fermentation medium is maintained by a cooling jacket, coils, or both. Particularly exothermic fermentations may require the use of external heat exchangers. Nutrients may be continuously added to the fermenter, as in a fed-batch system, or may be charged into the reactor at the beginning of fermentation. The pH of the medium is measured and adjusted with small amounts of acid or base, depending upon the fermentation. For aerobic (and some anaerobic) fermentations, reactant gases (especially oxygen) must be added to the fermentation. Since oxygen is relatively insoluble in water (the basis of nearly all fermentation media), air (or purified oxygen) must be added continuously. The action of the rising bubbles helps mix the fermentation medium and also "strips" out waste gases, such as carbon dioxide. In practice, bioreactors are often pressurized; this increases the solubility of oxygen in water. In an aerobic process, optimal oxygen transfer is sometimes the rate limiting step. Oxygen is poorly soluble in water—even less in warm fermentation broths—and is relatively scarce in air (20.95%). Oxygen transfer is usually helped by agitation, which is also needed to mix nutrients and to keep the fermentation homogeneous. Gas dispersing agitators are used to break up air bubbles and circulate them throughout the vessel.

Fouling can harm the overall efficiency of the bioreactor, especially the heat exchangers. To avoid it, the bioreactor must be easily cleaned. Interior surfaces are typically made of stainless steel for easy cleaning and sanitation. Typically bioreactors are cleaned between batches, or are designed to reduce fouling as much as possible when operated continuously. Heat transfer is an important part of bioreactor design; small vessels can be cooled with a cooling jacket, but larger vessels may require coils or an external heat exchanger.

Scale-down bioreactors play an important rule in process development as they allow for parameters to be fine-tuned without substantial materials or consumables investments.

== Types ==
=== Photobioreactor ===
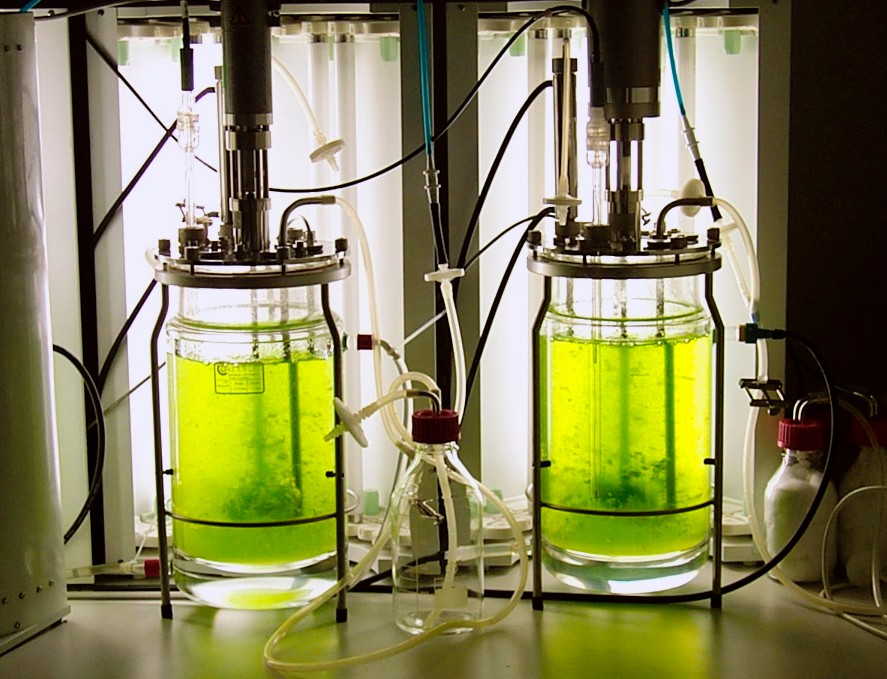
Moss photobioreactor with Physcomitrella patens

A photobioreactor (PBR) is a bioreactor which incorporates some type of light source (that may be natural sunlight or artificial illumination). Virtually any translucent container could be called a PBR, however the term is more commonly used to define a closed system, as opposed to an open storage tank or pond. Photobioreactors are used to grow small phototrophic organisms such as cyanobacteria, algae, or moss plants. These organisms use light through photosynthesis as their energy source and do not require sugars or lipids as energy source. Consequently, risk of contamination with other organisms like bacteria or fungi is lower in photobioreactors when compared to bioreactors for heterotroph organisms.

=== Sewage treatment ===
Conventional sewage treatment utilises bioreactors to undertake the main purification processes. In some of these systems, a chemically inert medium with very high surface area is provided as a substrate for the growth of biological film. Separation of excess biological film takes place in settling tanks or cyclones. In other systems aerators supply oxygen to the sewage and biota to create activated sludge in which the biological component is freely mixed in the liquid in "flocs". In these processes, the liquid's biochemical oxygen demand (BOD) is reduced sufficiently to render the contaminated water fit for reuse. The biosolids can be collected for further processing, or dried and used as fertilizer. An extremely simple version of a sewage bioreactor is a septic tank whereby the sewage is left in situ, with or without additional media to house bacteria. In this instance, the biosludge itself is the primary host for the bacteria.

=== Bioreactors for specialized tissues ===
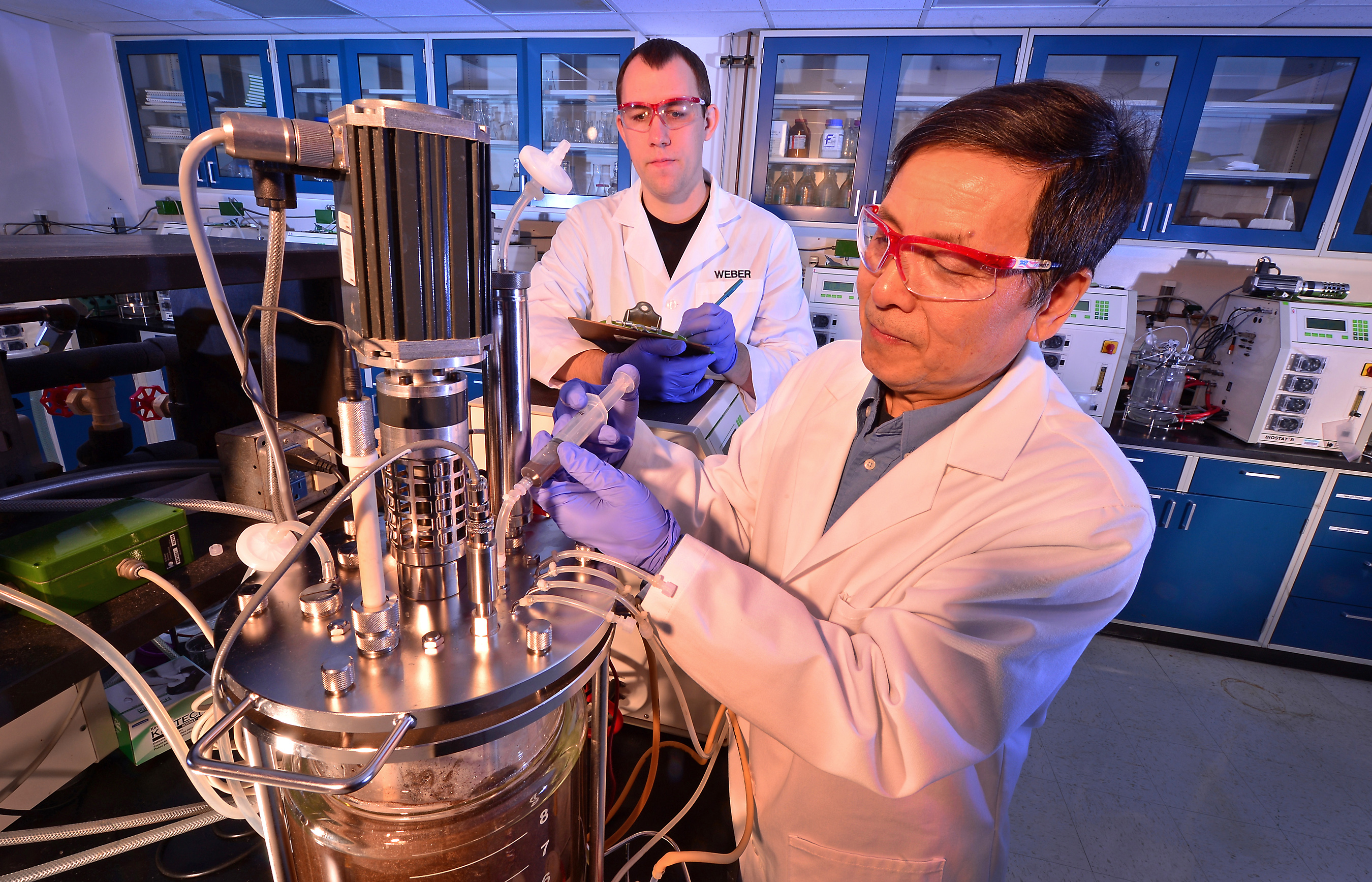
A bioreactor used to ferment ethanol from corncob waste being loaded with yeast

Many cells and tissues, especially mammalian ones, must have a surface or other structural support in order to grow, and agitated environments are often destructive to these cell types and tissues. Higher organisms, being auxotrophic, also require highly specialized growth media. This poses a challenge when the goal is to culture larger quantities of cells for therapeutic production purposes, and a significantly different design is needed compared to industrial bioreactors used for growing protein expression systems such as yeast and bacteria.

Many research groups have developed novel bioreactors for growing specialized tissues and cells on a structural scaffold, in attempt to recreate organ-like tissue structures in-vitro. Among these include tissue bioreactors that can grow heart tissue, skeletal muscle tissue, ligaments, cancer tissue models, and others. Currently, scaling production of these specialized bioreactors for industrial use remains challenging and is an active area of research.

For more information on artificial tissue culture, see tissue engineering.

=== Mini‑bioreactors ===
Mini‑bioreactors are small‑scale bioreactor systems with working volumes typically below 0.5 L. They are designed to reduce operational costs while enabling extensive parallelization and customization. Advances such as low‑cost sensors, microcontroller‑based control platforms (e.g., Arduino or Raspberry Pi), and integrated automation allow precise monitoring of parameters including optical density and dissolved oxygen, making them a practical alternative to larger benchtop systems.

In Adaptive laboratory evolution (ALE), mini‑bioreactors support long‑term cultivation under controlled selective pressures. They can operate in batch, chemostat, turbidostat or morbidostat modes, each enabling different strategies for maintaining steady growth conditions or dynamically adjusting stress levels. Their automation‑ready design facilitates stable operation over many generations, making them valuable tools for studying microbial evolution, metabolic engineering and the development of antimicrobial resistance.

== Modelling ==
Mathematical models act as an important tool in various bio-reactor applications including wastewater treatment. These models are useful for planning efficient process control strategies and predicting the future plant performance. Moreover, these models are beneficial in education and research areas.

Bioreactors are generally used in those industries which are concerned with food, beverages and pharmaceuticals. The emergence of biochemical engineering is of recent origin. Processing of biological materials using biological agents such as cells, enzymes or antibodies are the major pillars of biochemical engineering. Applications of biochemical engineering cover major fields of civilization such as agriculture, food and healthcare, resource recovery and fine chemicals.

Until now, the industries associated with biotechnology have lagged behind other industries in implementing control over the process and optimization strategies. A main drawback in biotechnological process control is the problem of measuring key physical and biochemical parameters.

=== Operational stages in a bio-process ===
A bioprocess is composed mainly of three stages—upstream processing, bioreaction, and downstream processing—to convert raw material to finished product.

The raw material can be of biological or non-biological origin. It is first converted to a more suitable form for processing. This is done in an upstream processing step which involves chemical hydrolysis, preparation of liquid medium, separation of particulate, air purification and many other preparatory operations.

After the upstream processing step, the resulting feed is transferred to one or more bioreaction stages. The biochemical reactors or bioreactors form the base of the bioreaction step. This step mainly consists of three operations, namely, production of biomass, metabolite biosynthesis and biotransformation.

Finally, the material produced in the bioreactor must be further processed in the downstream section to convert it into a more useful form. The downstream process mainly consists of physical separation operations which include solid liquid separation, adsorption, liquid-liquid extraction, distillation, drying etc.

=== Specifications ===
A typical bioreactor consists of following parts:

Agitator – Used for the mixing of the contents of the reactor which keeps the cells in the perfect homogenous condition for better transport of nutrients and oxygen to the desired product(s).

Baffle – Used to break the vortex formation in the vessel, which is usually highly undesirable as it changes the center of gravity of the system and consumes additional power.

Sparger – In aerobic cultivation process, the purpose of the sparger is to supply adequate oxygen to the growing cells.

Jacket – The jacket provides the annular area for circulation of constant temperature of water which keeps the temperature of the bioreactor at a constant value.

== See also ==
- ATP test
- Biochemical engineering
- Biofuel from algae
- Biological hydrogen production (algae)
- Bioprocessor
- Bioreactor landfill
- Biotechnology
- Cell culture
- Chemostat
- Digester
- Electro-biochemical reactor (EBR)
- Hairy root culture
- History of biotechnology
- Hollow fiber bioreactor
- Immobilized enzyme
- Industrial biotechnology
- Moving bed biofilm reactor
- Septic tank
- Single-use bioreactor
- Tissue engineering
