= Syrris Ltd =

British chemistry corporation

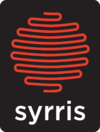
- Company type: Private
- Industry: Scientific Instrumentation
- Founded: 2001
- Headquarters: 27 Jarman Way, Royston, Hertfordshire, UK
- Area served: Worldwide
- Key people: Mike Hawes (CEO); Mark Gilligan (Chairman)
- Products: Chemical Reactors; Flow Chemistry Reactors; Calorimeters
- Number of employees: ~125 (2017)
- Parent: Asahi Glassplant Inc. (AG!)
- Subsidiaries: Syrris Inc., Syrris Scientific Equipment Pvt. Ltd., Syrris Japan, Inc., Syrris do Brasil Ltda
- Website: www.syrris.com

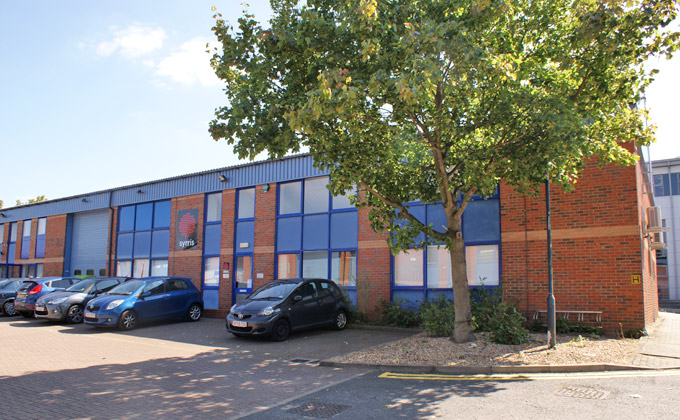
Syrris Ltd UK head office

Syrris Ltd is a British multinational corporation based in Royston, United Kingdom. It manufactures chemical reactors for research and development chemists and is a market leader in flow chemistry products. The company has subsidiary offices in the United States, Japan, India and Brazil and is supported by approximately 35 distributors worldwide.

As of mid-2013, the company employs about 40 chemists, engineers, manufacturing, operations, marketing, and sales staff in its head office and other offices worldwide.

== History ==
The company was founded by Mark Gilligan and Richard Gray in August 2001, and used to be part of the Blacktrace Holdings Group, which also includes The Dolomite Centre Ltd. On January 1, 2020, Syrris was acquired by Asahi Glassplant UK. Since 2001, Syrris have developed and manufactured new technologies for the pharmaceutical and medicinal chemistry industries, including grant-funded projects.

In 2004 Syrris developed the AFRICA (Automated Flow Reaction Incubation and Control Apparatus) flow chemistry system in partnership with GlaxoSmithKline to accelerate the medicinal chemistry element of drug discovery. In 2006 Syrris launched FRX, a low-cost alternative to AFRICA, and Atlas, an automated laboratory scale batch reactor. In 2011, Syrris added 2 new products to its portfolio, the Globe chemical reactor platform and the Asia flow chemistry system, which was a recipient of an R&D100 Award in June 2012.

== Products ==
Syrris designs and manufactures products for chemists including flow chemistry, microreactor, and automation technology products. The products are for use in different applications, such as process chemistry, discovery chemistry, crystallization, and other chemistry related applications.

== Operations ==
Since 2001, Syrris has focused heavily on global exports. At the end of 2007, the company launched 2 new product ranges, and with these new products, the company expanded their distribution network into markets such as India, Japan, Italy and Australia. Currently the company exports over 90% of their products, with 35% of this business in Asia.

In January 2010 it was announced that Syrris were to open their latest global subsidiary office in Brazil, a move backed by UK Trade & Investment with the aim of increasing trade with South America. This has been praised by the incumbent Business Secretary, Vince Cable, who in October 2010 said "it is clear to me that there is great untapped potential in the UK’s business relationship with Brazil. Syrris is one company that is clearly leading the way."

== See also ==
- Batch reactor
- Chemical reactor
- Flow chemistry
- Jacketed vessel
- Microreactor
- Dolomite Bio
