= Microchannel =

Microchannel may refer to:

- Microchannel (microtechnology), used in fluid control, heat transfer cell migration observation
- Micro Channel architecture, a proprietary parallel computer bus

== See also ==
- Microchannel plate detector
- Microreactor, or microchannel reactor
- Micro heat exchanger
