= Microscale (disambiguation) =

Microscale is defined at the micrometre level spanning 0.1–100μm.

Microscale may also refer to:

- Microscale meteorology
- Microscale chemistry
- Kolmogorov microscales
- Micro-scale heat exchangers
- Micro-scale fluidics
- Micro-scale reactor
- Microscale and macroscale models
- Micro-scale MOSFETs, used in certain commercial products
