= International Conference on Microreaction Technology =

The International Conference on Microreaction Technology (IMRET) is a scientific conference series in the field of micro process engineering and the science of microreactors.

== Chronology ==
- IMRET 1, Frankfurt, Germany, February 1997
- IMRET 2, New Orleans, United States, March 1998
- IMRET 3, Frankfurt, Germany, April 1999
- IMRET 4, Atlanta, United States, March 2000
- IMRET 5, Strasbourg, France, May 2001
- IMRET 6, New Orleans, United States, March 2002
- IMRET 7, Lausanne, Switzerland, September 2003
- IMRET 8, Atlanta, United States, April 2005
- IMRET 9, Potsdam, Germany, September 2006
- IMRET 10, New Orleans, United States, April 2008
- IMRET 11, Kyoto, Japan, March 2010
- IMRET 12, Lyon, France, February 2012
- IMRET 13, Budapest, Hungary, June 2014
- IMRET 14, Beijing, China, September 2016
- IMRET 15, Karlsruhe, Germany, October 2018
- IMRET 16, Melbourne, Australia, November 2022
- IMRET 17, Graz, Austria, October 2024
- IMRET 18, Kyoto, Japan, September 2026
