= IMVT =

IMVT can stand for:

- the Institute for Micro Process Engineering at the Karlsruhe Research Center
- Institut für Mechanische Verfahrenstechnik der Universität Stuttgart (Institute for Mechanical Process Engineering) at Stuttgart University
- Intermediate Value Theorem
