= Maximilian Fichtner =

German chemist

Maximillian Fichtner
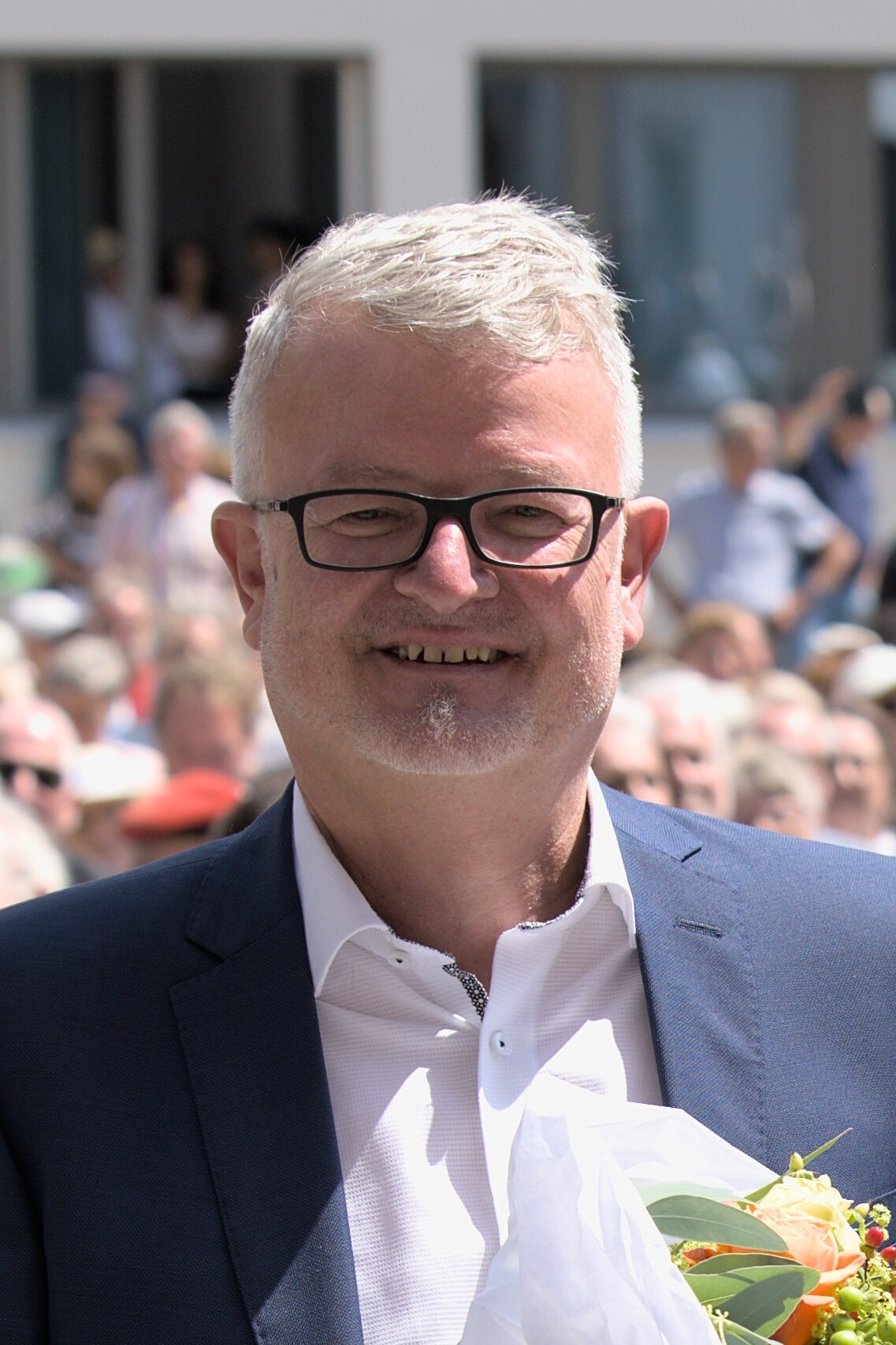
- Born: 1961 (age 64–65); Heidelberg, Germany
- Occupations: Professor, Scholar

Maximilian Fichtner (born 1961 in Heidelberg, Germany) is professor for Solid-State Chemistry at the University of Ulm and executive director of the Helmholtz Institute Ulm for Electrochemical Energy Storage (HIU).

== Education ==
Fichtner was educated in Food Chemistry and Chemistry at the University of Karlsruhe, where he was awarded by the Diploma in Chemistry. In 1992, he received the Ph.D. in Chemistry/Surface Science with distinction and the Hermann Billing Award for his thesis. In the thesis he developed a novel method for a spatially resolved speciation of beam-sensitive salts by SIMS. With the method he analysed the surface composition of atmospheric salt aerosol particles and contributed to the current climate model.

== Career ==
Following his PhD, Fichtner spent two years as a young researcher at the former Karlsruhe Nuclear Research Center (KfK) and developed his method further so that it could be applied to organic materials also. In 1994, he became assistant to the board of directors of the Karlsruhe Research Center (FZK), in the area Basic Research and New Technologies, with Herbert Gleiter as director. In 1997, he left to build up a new activity on microprocess engineering, with a focus on heterogeneous catalysis in microchannels, for fuel processing (methanol steam reforming, partial oxidation of methane) and synthesis of chemicals. The group was eventually integrated in the new Institute for Microprocess Engineering in 2001. In 2000, he was offered a position at the new Institute of Nanotechnology, INT (Founding directors: Herbert Gleiter, Jean-Marie-Lehn, Dieter Fenske) to build up a new activity on nanoscale materials for energy storage. Since then, he is group leader there. In 2012, he received a call by the University of Ulm to become a professor (W3) in Solid State Chemistry, which he accepted in 2013. The position is connected to a function as group leader at the new Helmholtz Institute Ulm. Since 2015, he has been executive director of the institute.

Fichtner has co-ordinated several EU projects and collaborative projects from the German ministries of Economy and Research and Education. He has been organizer of various symposia at MRS and GRC conferences, and he was Chair of the GORDON Research Conference on Metal-Hydrogen Systems in 2013 and of the 1st International Symposium on Magnesium Batteries (MagBatt) in 2016.

== Research ==
In his career, Fichtner worked on various topics, covering Theoretical Chemistry, Instrumental Analysis, Higher Administration, Chemical Engineering, Heterogeneous Catalysis, Hydrogen Storage, Electrochemistry and Battery Research.

Pioneering achievements were the first measurements of salts with Secondary Neutral Mass Spectrometry, the development of a depth-resolved speciation of beam sensitive salts, a microstructure reactor which could safely burn and transfer the heat from a stoichiometric hydrogen-oxygen mixture to a thermo oil, thus demonstrating the enormous capability of running dangerous reactions in microstructure reactors safely.

In the development of hydrogen storage materials, new complex hydride compounds were synthesized and investigated, the fasted charge and discharge of an aluminum hydride to date by a new Ti13 catalyst, first applied for that purpose by the Bogdanovig group of Max Planck Mülheim, was independently confirmed. Further work in this area was focused on elucidating nanoscale effects in energy materials and studies, based on pioneering work since the late 1990s by various groups from all over the world on hydrogen and the effects by nanostructures, of the change of thermodynamic properties of complex hydrides was conducted in his group.

In battery research, new synthesis methods were developed to stabilize conversion materials, new types of batteries based on anionic shuttles were presented and new electrolytes were developed for magnesium properties with outstanding voltage windows and non-nucleophilic properties, making reversible Mg-S cells possible. Moreover, a new class of cathode materials is being studied with the highest packing densities for Li ions to date, the so-called Li-excess disordered rocksalt materials (DRX), developed by the Gerbrand Ceder group.
