= Microchannel (microtechnology) =

Basic structure used in microtechnology

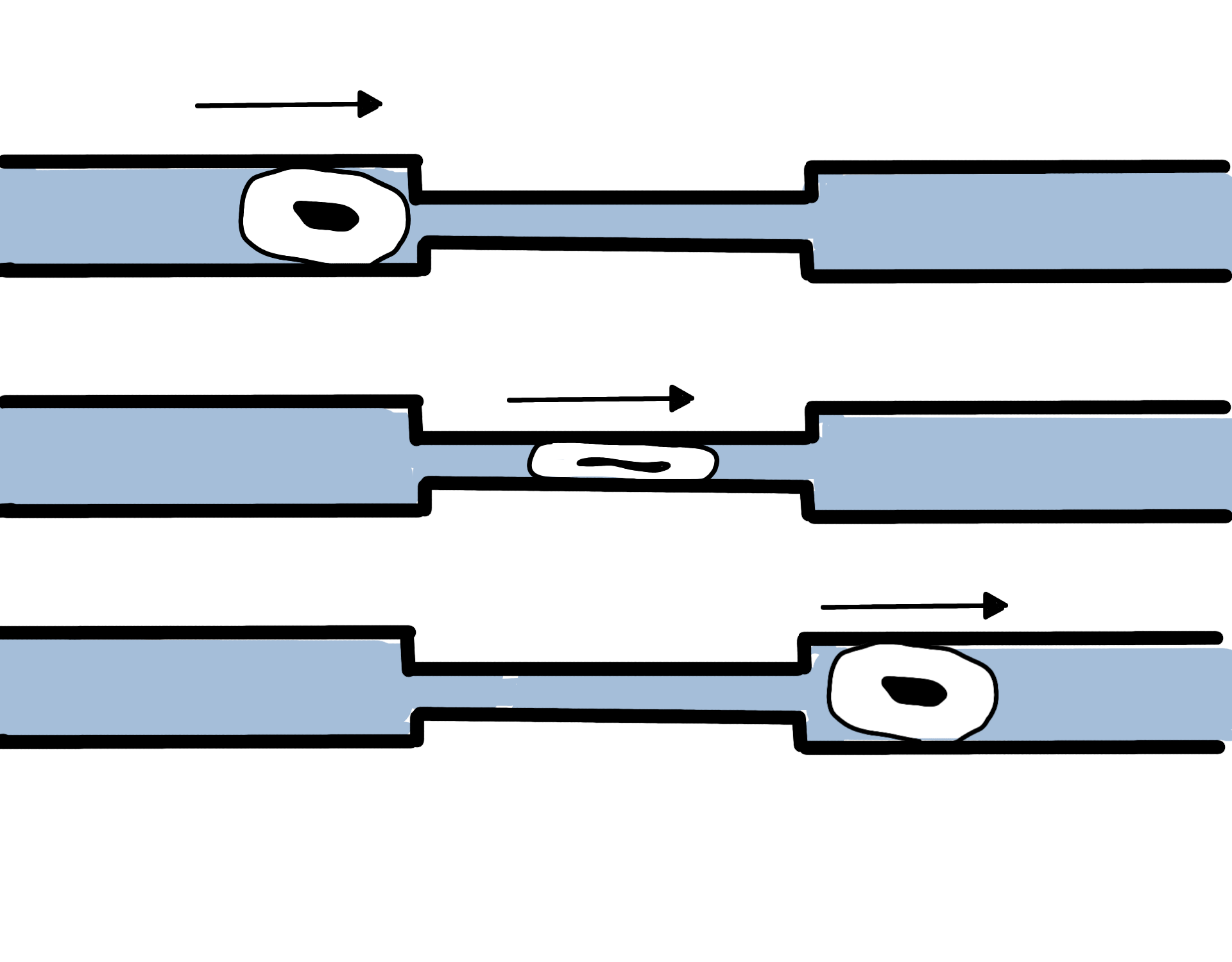
Depiction of a cell passing through a microchannel

Microchannel in microtechnology is a channel with a hydraulic diameter below 1 mm, usually 1–99 μm. Microchannels are used in fluid control (see Microfluidics), heat transfer (see Micro heat exchanger) and cell migration observation. They are more efficient than their 'macro' counterparts, because of a high surface-area to volume ratio yet pose a multitude of challenges due to their small size.

== Materials ==
Different types of materials are required for the different uses of microchannels. These are the three main categories.

=== Polymeric and glass substrates ===
Polymethyl methacrylate (PMMA) is used as a solution to a wide range of microfluidic devices due to its low cost and easier fabricating methods. Silicon elastomers can be used for situations in which elasticity and deformation is necessary.

=== Metallic substrates ===
Metallic substrates are often chosen for their advantageous metallic properties, such as withstanding high temperatures and transferring heat faster. They can be subject to corrosion.

=== Semiconductors, ceramics and composites ===
Ceramic materials allow for high-temperature operation in comparison to metallic substrates and enable operation in harsh chemical environments in which metals cannot be used.

== History ==
The concept of the microchannel was proposed for the first time by researchers Tuckerman and Pease of Stanford Electronics Laboratories in 1981. They suggested an effective method for designing microchannels in the laminar and fully developed flow.

== Common uses ==
Microchannels are extensively used in the pharmaceuticals, and biochemical industries due to short diffusion distances, higher interfacial area, and higher heat/mass transfer rates.

== See also ==
- Micro process engineering
- Microreactor
