= Hiu =

Hiu or HIU may refer to:

- Hiw Island, or Hiu, in Vanuatu
  - Hiw language, or Hiu, spoken on Hiu Island
- Hiu Station, in Sasebo City, Nagasaki, Japan
- Helmholtz Institute Ulm, in Germany
- Hope International University, in Fullerton, California
