= Bazylak =

Bazylak is a surname. Notable people with this name include:

- Aimy Bazylak (born 1980), Canadian mechanical engineer
- Bob Bazylak, American football player on the 1967 Pittsburgh Panthers football team
- Marcin Bazylak (born 1978), Polish politician, mayor of Dąbrowa Górnicza
