= Institute for Micro Process Engineering =

German research center

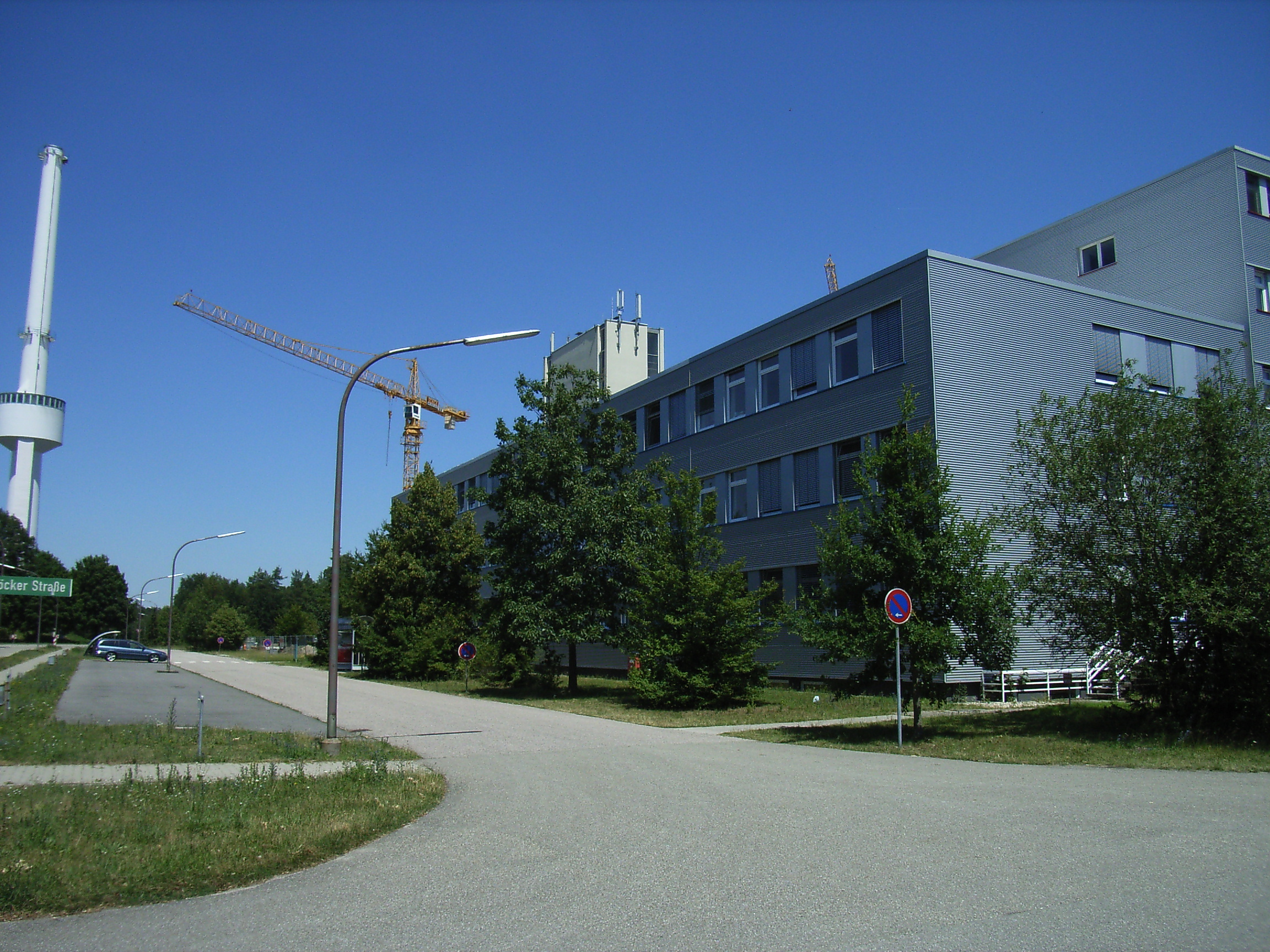
Institute for Micro Process Engineering IMVT, view from the south-west

The Institute for Micro Process Engineering IMVT (from the German name Institut für Mikroverfahrenstechnik) is an institute within the Karlsruhe Research Center (Forschungszentrum Karlsruhe) in Eggenstein-Leopoldshafen, Germany. Its main field of activity is micro process engineering, the science of conducting chemical and/or physical processes in confines with typical dimensions below 1 mm.

== History and organization ==
The IMVT was formally established in July 2001 and continued previous activities in micro process engineering carried out by the Central Experimentation Department (Hauptabteilung Versuchstechnik, HVT) at the Karlsruhe Research Center. Its first director was Klaus Schubert. Between 1997 and 2001 the first activities, which were focused on developing and testing micro heat exchangers, were expanded by a new group (Head: Maximilian Fichtner) to chemical process engineering in microchannels, with a focus on fuel processing (methanol steam reforming, partial oxidation of methane), synthesis of chemicals and fundamental studies on new types of micro heat exchangers and heterogeneous catalysis under dynamic reaction conditions and in the Knudsen regime. In 2001, the entire activity was turned into a new institute, the IMVT.

Professor Roland Dittmeyer assumed control of the institute in July 2009. The IMVT operates within the programs "Nano- and Microsystems" and "Sustainability and Technology" of the Helmholtz Association. Its staff initially consisted of about 40 employees (on 31 December 2001) and numbered approximately 50 in 2005. The institute carries out both basic development of apparatus (e.g. "microreactors") and processes, funded via the Helmholtz Association and the Research Center, as well as development projects in cooperation with and funded by industry.
