= Aimy Bazylak =

Canadian professor

Aimy Ming Jii Bazylak (née Hom, born in Regina, Saskatchewan) is a Canadian professor of mechanical engineering at the University of Toronto, where she holds a Tier II Canada Research Chair in Thermofluidics for Clean Energy. Her research involves microfluidics, nanofluidics, and their applications in fuel cell design and in carbon sequestration.

== Education and career ==
Bazylak graduated from the University of Saskatchewan in 2003, with great distinction in engineering physics, also winning the university's Dr. E.L. Harrington Prize. She completed her doctorate in 2008 at the University of Victoria with the dissertation Liquid Water Transport in Fuel Cell Gas Diffusion Layers, supported in part by the inaugural Bullitt Environmental Fellowship, and while there also taking part as a driver in the Shell Eco-marathon.

She became an assistant professor at the University of Toronto in 2008. At Toronto, she is a former director of the Institute for Sustainable Energy.

== Recognition ==
Bazylak was named as a Fellow of the American Society of Mechanical Engineers in 2019, and is also a Fellow of the Canadian Society for Mechanical Engineering. She was elected to the College of New Scholars of the Royal Society of Canada in 2020. She is a fellow of the Canadian Academy of Engineering.

She was named an Alexander Von Humboldt Fellow in 2015, and in 2020 was named a Helmholtz International Fellow by the Helmholtz Association of German Research Centres, funding her research collaborations with Roswitha Zeis at the Helmholtz Institute Ulm.

The University of Toronto gave Bazylak their annual McLean Award, a $125,000 award for outstanding early career researchers, in 2020.
