= Dolomite Bio =

English healthcare company

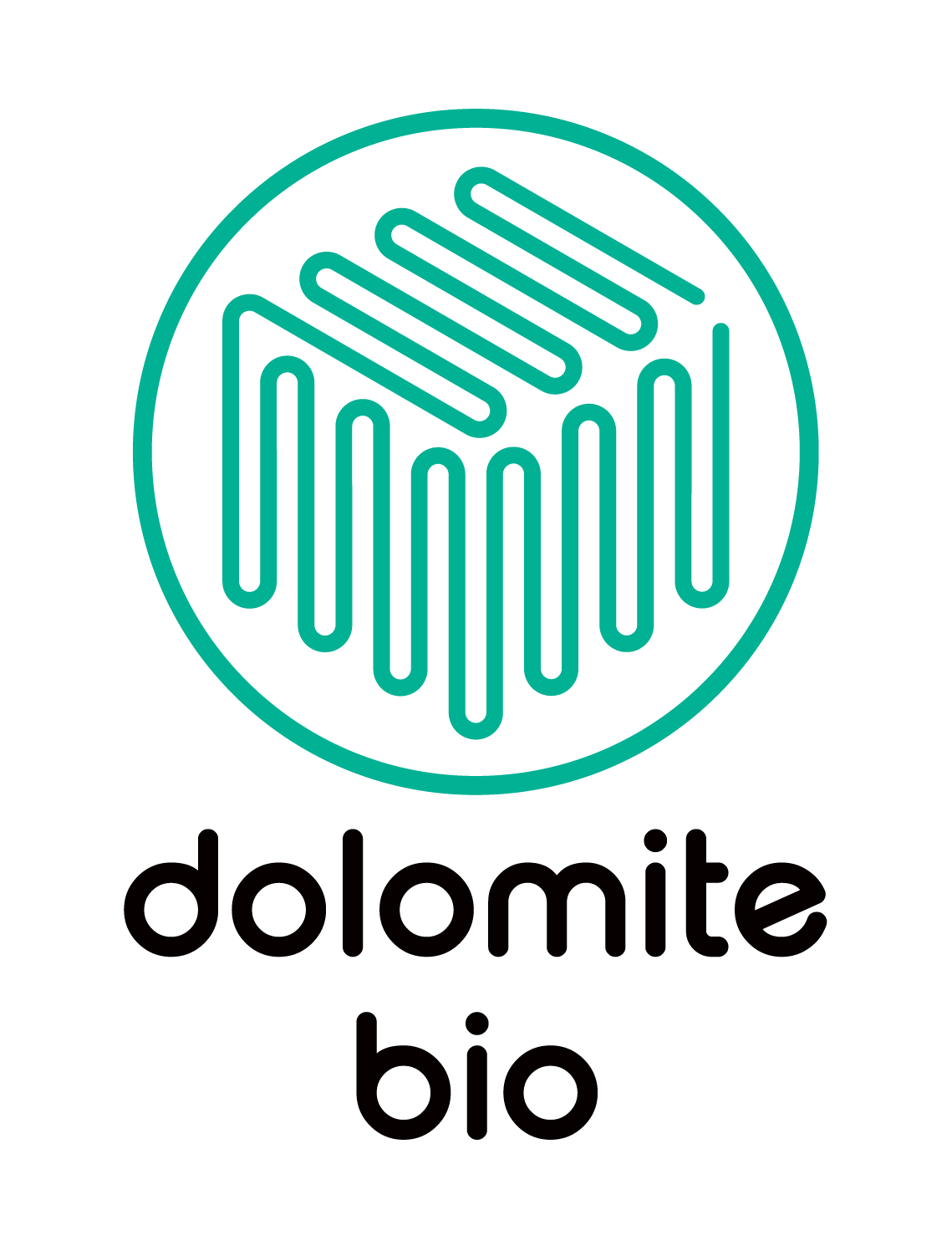
- Type: Private
- Industry: Scientific Instrumentation
- Founded: 2016
- Headquarters: Royston, Hertfordshire, UK
- Area served: Worldwide
- Key people: Mark Gilligan (CEO)
- Products: Single cell sequencing
- Number of employees: ~40 (2016)
- Website: dolomite-microfluidics.com

Dolomite Bio, headquartered in Royston, Hertfordshire, UK, is a biotechnology company that creates products for high throughput single cell research for biologists. Dolomite Bio is based out of five global offices, with headquarters in the UK and regional offices in the US, Japan, Vietnam and Brazil.

Dolomite Bio is part of the Blacktrace Holdings ltd.

== History ==
Dolomite Bio was founded in March 2016 from its sister company Dolomite Microfluidics (part of the Blacktrace group of companies). Dolomite Bio now serves all of Dolomite Microfluidics' biology customers and develops new products specifically for biologists.

== Products ==
Dolomite Bio creates products for high throughput single cell research which can encapsulate single cells in microfluidic droplets.

Dolomite Bio's Nadia Instrument is a fully automated, microfluidic droplet-based platform for single cell research that encapsulates up to 8 samples, in parallel, in under 20 mins. Over 50,000 single cells can be captured per cartridge in a run. The Instrument guides users through all relevant steps of the experiment via a touchscreen interface.

Dolomite Bio also offers an add-on to the Nadia Instrument called Nadia Innovate, which turns it into an open system for the development of new single cell protocols and applications. Newly developed protocols can be transferred to the Nadia Instrument for high throughput parallel operation. Users are able to control parameters such as droplet size, droplet frequency, temperature, agitation and timing.

The Nadia platform can be used for single cell RNA-Seq (scRNA-Seq), single nuclei RNA-Seq (sNuc-Seq), plant protoplast RNA-Seq (ppRNA-Seq) and the encapsulation of cells in Agarose beads.

== Technology ==
Dolomite Bio systems employ the principle of microfluidic flow technology focussing to rapidly encapsulate single cells in millions of aqueous droplets in oil. The droplets are identically sized and, depending on the application, can be 10 – 100 μm in diameter.

=== Advantages of encapsulating cells in microfluidic droplets ===
- Enables analysis of millions of individual cells and their biological products (over 10^{5} single-cell libraries/hour).
- Improve efficiency and robustness of single-cell reactions—droplets are small (often 10s to 100s of picolitres), so e.g., effective mRNA concentration is high.
- Controls micro-reactor volumes and prevents cross-contamination, thus improving reliability and reproducibility of results.
- Droplets can be used as micro-compartments or micro-reactors.
- Can capture quantitative data from rare cells.
