= Batch reactor =

Chemical reactor

Batch reactor symbol

A batch reactor is a chemical reactor in which a non-continuous reaction is conducted, i.e., one where the reactants, products and solvent do not flow in or out of the vessel during the reaction until the target reaction conversion is achieved. By extension, the expression is somehow inappropriately used for other batch fluid processing operations that do not involve a chemical reaction, such as solids dissolution, product mixing, batch distillation, crystallization, and liquid/liquid extraction. In such cases, however, they may not be referred to as reactors but rather with a term specific to the function they perform (such as crystallizer, bioreactor, etc.).

Many batch processes are designed on the basis of a scale-up from the laboratory, particularly for the manufacture of specialty chemicals and pharmaceuticals. If this is the case, the process development will produce a recipe for the manufacturing process, which has many similarities to a recipe used in cookery. A typical batch reactor consists of a pressure vessel with an agitator and integral heating/cooling system. The vessels may vary in size from less than 1 L to more than 15,000 L. They are usually fabricated in steel, stainless steel, glass-lined steel, glass or exotic alloys. Liquids and solids are usually charged via connections in the top cover of the reactor. Vapors and gases also discharge through connections in the top. Liquids are usually discharged out of the bottom.

The advantages of the batch reactor lie with its versatility. A single vessel can carry out a sequence of different operations without the need to break containment. This is particularly useful when processing toxic or highly potent compounds.

== Agitation ==
The usual agitator arrangement is a centrally mounted driveshaft with an overhead drive unit. Impeller blades are mounted on the shaft. A wide variety of blade designs are used and typically the blades cover about two thirds of the diameter of the reactor. Where viscous products are handled, anchor shaped paddles are often used which have a close clearance between the blade and the vessel walls.

Most batch reactors also use baffles. These are stationary blades which break up flow caused by the rotating agitator. These may be fixed to the vessel cover or mounted on the interior of the side walls.

Despite significant improvements in agitator blade and baffle design, mixing in large batch reactors is ultimately constrained by the amount of energy that can be applied. On large vessels, mixing energies of more than 5 W/L can put an unacceptable burden on the cooling system. High agitator loads can also create shaft stability problems. Where mixing is a critical parameter, the batch reactor is not the ideal solution. Much higher mixing rates can be achieved by using smaller flowing systems with high-speed agitators, ultrasonic mixing or static mixers.

== Heating and cooling systems ==
Products within batch reactors usually liberate or absorb heat during processing. Even the action of stirring stored liquids generates heat. In order to hold the reactor contents at the desired temperature, heat has to be added or removed by a cooling jacket or cooling pipe. Heating/cooling coils or external jackets are used for heating and cooling batch reactors. Heat transfer fluid passes through the jacket or coils to add or remove heat.

Within the chemical and pharmaceutical industries, external cooling jackets are generally preferred as they make the vessel easier to clean. The performance of these jackets can be defined by three parameters:

- Response time to modify the jacket temperature.
- Uniformity of jacket temperature.
- Stability of jacket temperature.

It can be argued that heat transfer coefficient is also an important parameter. It has to be recognized however that large batch reactors with external cooling jackets have severe heat transfer constraints by virtue of design. It is difficult to achieve better than 100 W/L even with ideal heat transfer conditions. By contrast, continuous reactors can deliver cooling capacities in excess of 10,000 W/L. For processes with very high heat loads, there are better solutions than batch reactors.

Fast temperature control response and uniform jacket heating and cooling is particularly important for crystallization processes or operations where the product or process is very temperature sensitive. There are several types of batch reactor cooling jackets, including single external jacket, half-coil jacket, and constant flux heat jacket.

=== Single external jacket ===
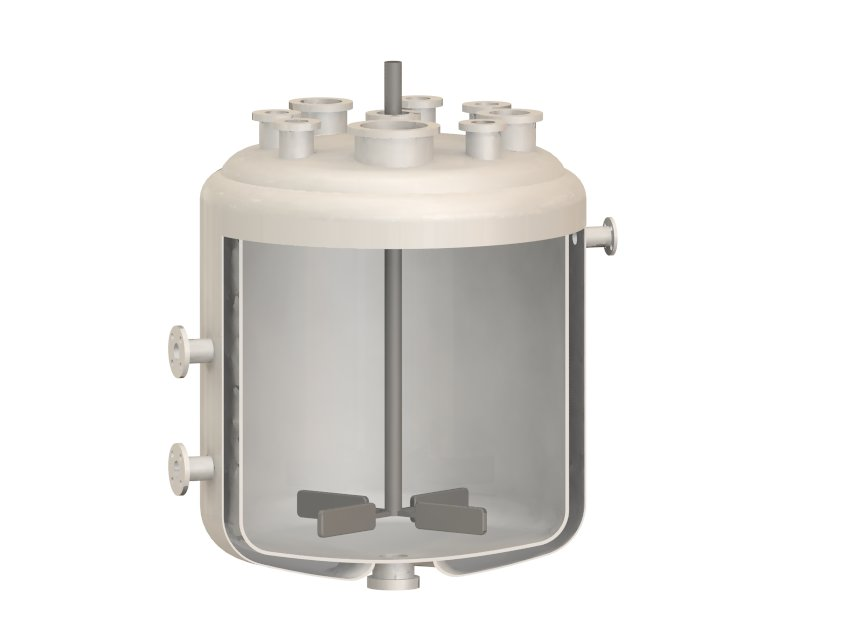
Batch reactor with single external cooling jacket

The single jacket design consists of an outer jacket which surrounds the vessel. Heat transfer fluid flows around the jacket and is injected at high velocity via nozzles. The temperature in the jacket is regulated to control heating or cooling.

The single jacket is probably the oldest design of external cooling jacket. Despite being a tried and tested solution, it has some limitations. On large vessels, it can take many minutes to adjust the temperature of the fluid in the cooling jacket. This results in sluggish temperature control. The distribution of heat transfer fluid is also far from ideal and the heating or cooling tends to vary between the side walls and bottom dish. Another issue to consider is the inlet temperature of the heat transfer fluid which can oscillate (in response to the temperature control valve) over a wide temperature range to cause hot or cold spots at the jacket inlet points.

=== Half-coil jacket ===
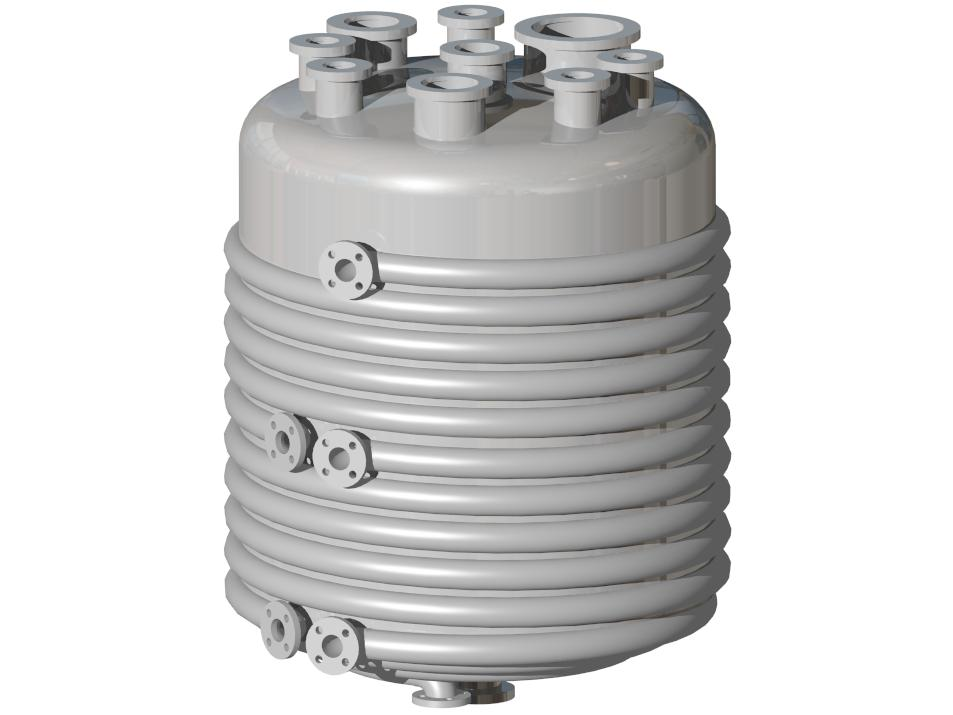
Batch reactor with half coil jacket

The half-coil jacket is made by welding a half pipe around the outside of the vessel to create a semi circular flow channel. The heat transfer fluid passes through the channel in a plug flow fashion. A large reactor may use several coils to deliver the heat transfer fluid. Like the single jacket, the temperature in the jacket is regulated to control heating or cooling.

The plug flow characteristics of a half coil jacket permits faster displacement of the heat transfer fluid in the jacket (typically less than 60 s). This is desirable for good temperature control. It also provides good distribution of heat transfer fluid which avoids the problems of non-uniform heating or cooling between the side walls and bottom dish. Like the single jacket design however the inlet heat transfer fluid is also vulnerable to large oscillations (in response to the temperature control valve) in temperature.

=== Constant flux cooling jacket ===
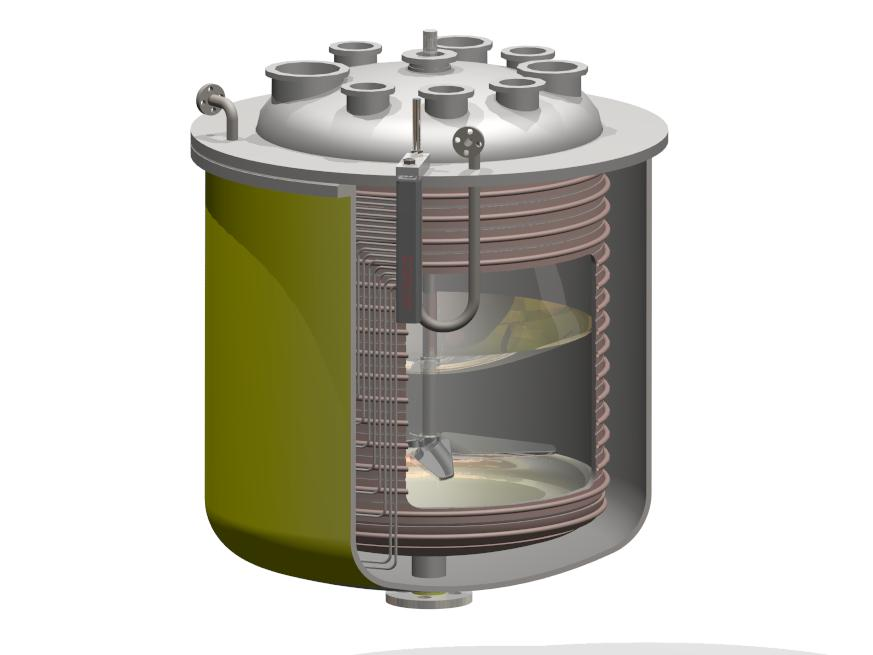
Batch reactor with constant flux jacket

The constant flux cooling jacket is a relatively recent development. It is not a single jacket but has a series of 20 or more small jacket elements. The temperature control valve operates by opening and closing these channels as required. By varying the heat transfer area in this way, the process temperature can be regulated without altering the jacket temperature.

The constant flux jacket has very fast temperature control response (typically less than 5 s) due to the short length of the flow channels and high velocity of the heat transfer fluid. Like the half coil jacket the heating/cooling flux is uniform. Because the jacket operates at substantially constant temperature however the inlet temperature oscillations seen in other jackets are absent. An unusual feature of this type jacket is that process heat can be measured very sensitively. This allows the user to monitor the rate of reaction for detecting end points, controlling addition rates, controlling crystallization etc.

== Applications ==
Batch reactors are often used in the process industry; in wastewater treatment, as they are effective in reducing biological oxygen demand (BOD) of influent untreated water; in the pharmaceutical industry; in laboratory applications, such as small-scale production, inducing fermentation for beverage products, and for experiments of reaction kinetics and thermodynamics; etc. Common issues ascribed to batch reactors are their relatively high cost and unreliability in terms of product quality.

== See also ==
- Continuous reactor
