= Micro heat exchanger =

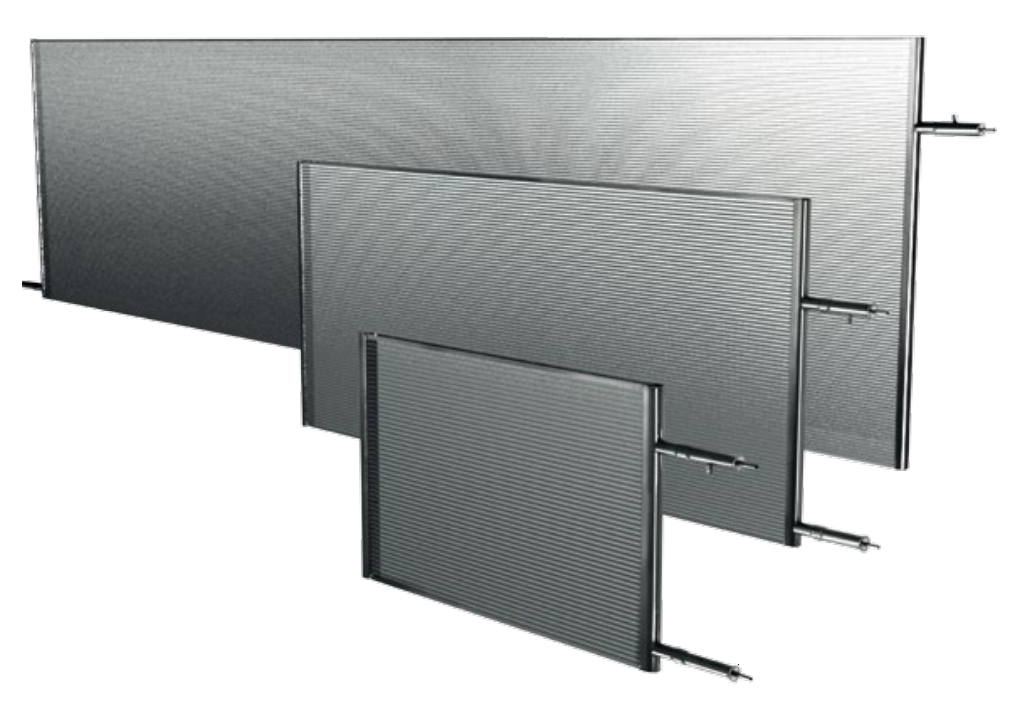
Three types of microchannel heat exchangers.

Micro heat exchangers, Micro-scale heat exchangers, or microstructured heat exchangers are heat exchangers in which (at least one) fluid flows in lateral confinements with typical dimensions below 1 mm. The most typical such confinement are microchannels, which are channels with a hydraulic diameter below 1 mm. Microchannel heat exchangers can be made from metal or ceramic.

Microchannel heat exchangers can be used for many applications including:

- high-performance aircraft gas turbine engines
- heat pumps
- Microprocessor and microchip cooling
- air conditioning

== Background ==
Investigation of microscale thermal devices is motivated by the single phase internal flow correlation for convective heat transfer:

$$h=\mathit{Nu}_c \frac{k}{d}$$

Where $h$ is the heat transfer coefficient, $\mathit{Nu}_c$ is the Nusselt number, $k$ is the thermal conductivity of the fluid and $d$ is the hydraulic diameter of the channel or duct. In internal laminar flows, the Nusselt number becomes a constant. This is a result which can be arrived at analytically: For the case of a constant wall temperature, $\mathit{Nu}_c=3.657$ and for the case of constant heat flux $\mathit{Nu}_c=4.364$ for round tubes. The last value is increased to 140/17 = 8.23 for flat parallel plates. As Reynolds number is proportional to hydraulic diameter, fluid flow in channels of small hydraulic diameter will predominantly be laminar in character. This correlation therefore indicates that the heat transfer coefficient increases as channel diameter decreases. Should the hydraulic diameter in forced convection be on the order of tens or hundreds of micrometres, an extremely high heat transfer coefficient should result.

This hypothesis was initially investigated by Tuckerman and Pease. Their positive results led to further research ranging from classical investigations of single channel heat transfer to more applied investigations in parallel micro-channel and micro scale plate fin heat exchangers. Recent work in the field has focused on the potential of two-phase flows at the micro-scale.

== Classification ==
Just like "conventional" or "macro scale" heat exchangers, micro heat exchangers have one, two or even three fluidic flows. In the case of one fluidic flow, heat can be transferred to the fluid (each of the fluids can be a gas, a liquid, or a multiphase flow) from electrically powered heater cartridges, or removed from the fluid by electrically powered elements like Peltier chillers. In the case of two fluidic flows, micro heat exchangers are usually classified by the orientation of the fluidic flows to another as "cross flow" or "counter flow" devices. If a chemical reaction is conducted inside a micro heat exchanger, the latter is also called a microreactor.

== See also ==
- Micro process engineering
