= Enhanced heat transfer =

Heat exchangers were initially developed to use plain (or smooth) heat transfer surfaces. An Enhanced heat transfer surface has a special surface geometry that provides a higher thermal performance, per unit base surface area than a plain surface.

== Objectives ==
This higher thermal performance, per unit base surface area A may be used to achieve one of the three objectives below:

- Size Reduction: If the heat exchange rate (Q) is held constant the heat exchanger length may be reduced. This will provide a smaller heat exchanger.
- Increased heat exchange rate: This may be exploited either of two ways:
  - Reduced driving temperature difference (ΔTm): If Q and the total tube length (L) are held constant, the ΔTm may be reduced. This provides increased thermodynamic process efficiency, and yields a savings of operating costs.
  - Increased Heat Exchange Rate: Keeping L constant, the increased UA/L will result in increased heat exchange rate for fixed fluid inlet temperatures.

This increase in heat transfer capacity per unit volume comes at the expense of an increase in pressure drop across the heat exchanger. This pressure drop may be significant, so the heat transfer enhancement is often limited by the pumping power available.

== Usage ==
The subject of “enhanced” heat transfer has become much more important to industry with progressing time. Use of relatively complex geometries were initially limited by manufacturing process. However, new manufacturing methods now allow manufacture of many complex surface geometries. Some enhanced surfaces (e.g., boiling and condensing tubes) are now in their 4th generation. Nearly all heat exchangers used in the air-conditioning and automotive industries are “enhanced” geometries. Further inroads are being seen in the electronic cooling, process and power industries.
