= Micro process engineering =

Micro process engineering is the science of conducting chemical or physical processes (unit operations) inside small volumina, typically inside channels with diameters of less than 1 mm (microchannels) or other structures with sub-millimeter dimensions. These processes are usually carried out in continuous flow mode, as opposed to batch production, allowing a throughput high enough to make micro process engineering a tool for chemical production. Micro process engineering is therefore not to be confused with microchemistry, which deals with very small overall quantities of matter.

The subfield of micro process engineering that deals with chemical reactions, carried out in microstructured reactors or "microreactors", is also known as microreaction technology.

The unique advantages of microstructured reactors or microreactors are enhanced heat transfer due to the large surface area-to-volume ratio, and enhanced mass transfer. For example, the length scale of diffusion processes is comparable to that of microchannels or even shorter, and efficient mixing of reactants can be achieved during very short times (typically milliseconds). The good heat transfer properties allow a precise temperature control of reactions. For example, highly exothermic reactions can be conducted almost isothermally when the microstructured reactor contains a second set of microchannels ("cooling passage"), fluidically separated from the reaction channels ("reaction passage"), through which a flow of cold fluid with sufficiently high heat capacity is maintained.

== Process intensification ==
While the dimensions of the individual channels are small, a micro process engineering device ("microstructured reactor") can contain many thousands of such channels, and the overall size of a microstructured reactor can be on the scale of meters. The objective of micro process engineering is to increase yields and selectivities of chemical reactions, thus reducing the cost of chemical production. This goal can be achieved by either using chemical reactions that cannot be conducted in larger volumina, or by running chemical reactions at parameters (temperatures, pressures, concentrations) that are inaccessible in larger volumina due to safety constraints. For example, the detonation of the stoichiometric mixture of two volume unit of hydrogen gas and one volume unit of oxygen gas does not propagate in microchannels with a sufficiently small diameter. This property is referred to as the "intrinsic safety" of microstructured reactors. The approach of making chemical manufacturing cheaper and more sustainable by using less equipment, less energy, and less waste per unit of output is known as "process intensification".

== History ==
Historically, micro process engineering originated around the 1980s, when mechanical micromachining methods developed for the fabrication of uranium isotope separation nozzles were applied to the manufacturing of compact heat exchangers at the Karlsruhe (Nuclear) Research Center.

== See also ==
- Flow chemistry
- Microreactor
