= Helmholtz Institute Ulm =

German research institute

Coordinates: 48.42634°N 9.96002°E

- Helmholtz Institute Ulm (HIU) for Electrochemical Energy Storage
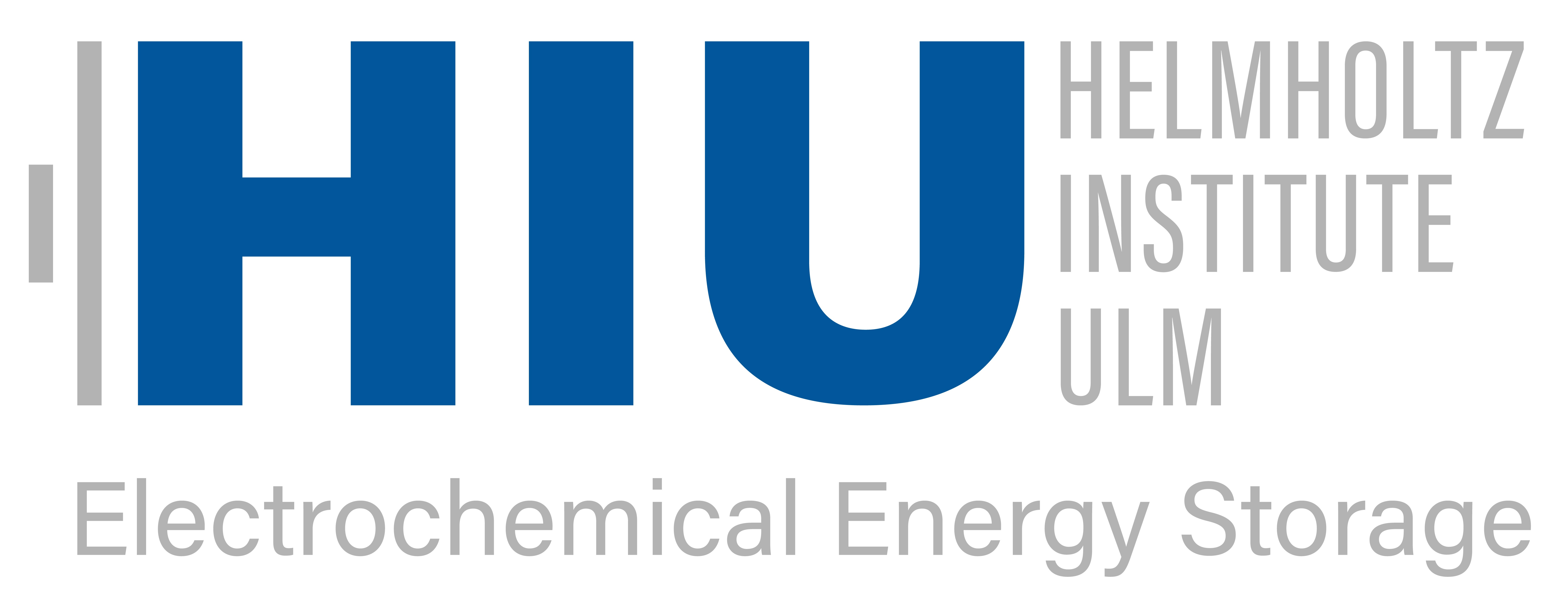

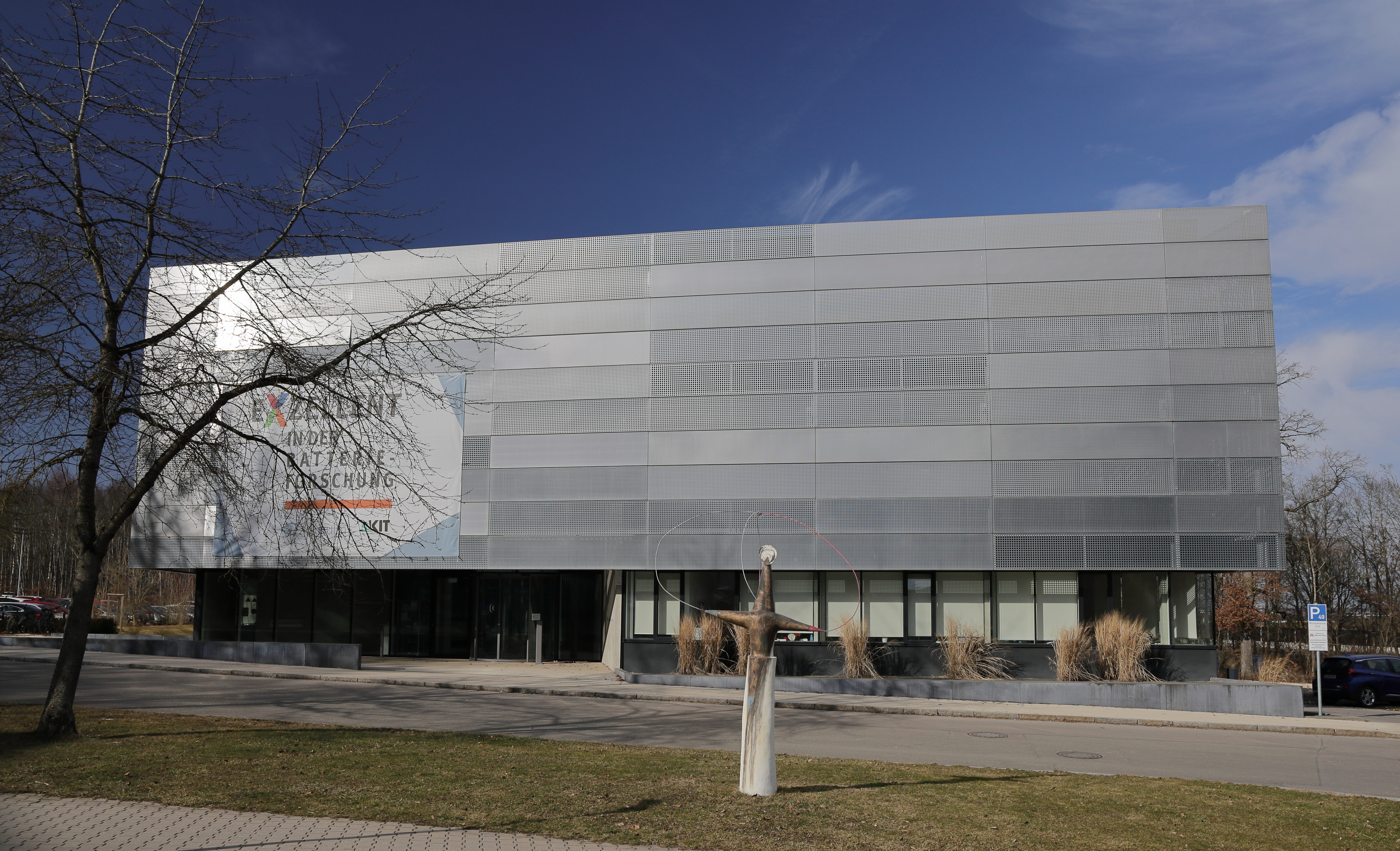
- Formation: 2011
- Type: Research institute
- Purpose: The objective of HIU is to develop sustainable electrochemical energy storage systems of the next generation
- Location: Campus University of Ulm, Germany
- Methods: Basic research, material science, battery research
- Fields: Chemistry; Physics; Material science Mathematics; Engineering
- Director: Prof. Maximilian Fichtner
- Board of directors: Prof. Stefano Passerini (Deputy Director), Prof. Oliver Kraft (KIT), Prof. Joachim Ankerhold (Univ. Ulm), Prof. Arnulf Latz (DLR), Dr. Margret Wohlfahrt-Mehrens (ZSW)
- Key people: Dr. Heribert Wilhelm (Managing Director)
- Parent organization: Karlsruhe Institute of Technology (KIT)
- Funding: Helmholtz Society
- Staff: 149 (2021)
- Website: www.hiu-batteries.de/en

The Helmholtz Institute Ulm (HIU) carries out research and development in the area of concepts for electrochemical batteries.

== Foundation ==
The institute was established in January 2011 as “National Center of Excellence” for application-oriented fundamental research in the area of batteries. Being part of the Helmholtz Association, it was jointly founded by Karlsruhe Institute of Technology (KIT), University of Ulm, and two more associated partners, the DLR German Aerospace Center, Stuttgart, which is also member of the Helmholtz Association, and the Center for Solar Energy and Hydrogen Research Baden-Württemberg (ZSW), Ulm. The Helmholtz Institute Ulm is supported by Karlsruhe Institute of Technology (KIT). The new institute building, which was inaugurated in October 2014, is located on the campus of University of Ulm and can accommodate about 120 employees.

== Research ==
HIU picks up on fundamental issues related to electrochemical storage systems and, on this basis, develops entirely new materials and cell concepts. The objective of HIU is to develop sustainable electrochemical energy storage devices of the next and next-but-one generation i.e., storage systems that store more energy and are more efficient, lighter, more durable, safer, and less expensive than conventional systems. Batteries of that kind are an answer to the urgent demand for better storage systems for portable electric devices and electric vehicles and contribute, in addition, to solving the problem of fluctuating availability of renewable energy sources.

To be able to achieve the above objectives, HIU gathers under its roof the expert knowledge of four leading research organizations. The skills of the partners involved cover almost all areas of battery research.

KIT is considered to be leading in the development of altogether new storage concepts and the synthesis and analysis of the necessary storage materials and electrolytes. In addition, KIT has renowned expertise and uses the latest methods for the structural, chemical and electrochemical characterization of materials and cells as well as for overall system analyses. The groups from Ulm University focus on the investigation of electrochemical fundamentals and the modelling of elementary processes on electrode surfaces and inside materials. ZSW for decades has been successfully researching into battery material applications and, in close cooperation with the industry, develops new cells and tests the suitability for daily use of batteries. DLR is highly competent in the development and application of mathematical models and simulations of entire battery cells as well as in system development.

HIU hence links excellent fundamental research with practical application. Together with Ulm University and KIT, HIU moreover expands teaching and promotion of young talents to train highly qualified young scientists in the strategically relevant field of battery research and industry.

== Building ==
The HIU building

In a 2015 competition, the new HIU building, which was planned by architects Nickl & Partner Architekten AG and was inaugurated in October 2014 after a two-year construction period, was awarded the Best 16 Architects Award in the category Educational Buildings.

The 2,400-square-meter HIU building has three floors and a full cellar to accommodate 120 employees. The research building is divided into different types of usable space: The atrium is adjoined towards the inside by the chemistry and physics laboratories, and the offices are found on the outer sides. The ground floor accommodates additional special-purpose laboratories which are illuminated naturally either through roof light walls or upstream lighting panels. The architecturally characteristic façade of the building consists of punched-sheet elements whose differently sized punched holes create a pattern of optical interferences. The elements can be folded up in front of the office windows and can thus be used as sun protection and glare shields.
