= List of biofuel companies and researchers =

== First-generation biofuels ==
First-generation biofuels use the edible parts of food plants as their carbon source feedstock. Due to this, the production of fuel from these crops effectively creates problems in regard to the global food production.

- ADM Ölmühle Hamburg, part of Archer Daniels Midland; Germany
  - Products: biodiesel
- Diester Industrie, part of Bunge Limited; France
  - Products: biodiesel
- Jilin Fuel Ethanol, part of China National Petroleum Corporation; China
- LS9, Inc, South San Francisco, California and Okeechobee, Florida, United States
  - Technology: fermenters with genetically modified bacteria
  - Feedstocks: sugar cane syrup; planned: cellulose agricultural residues
  - Products: fuel oils, chemicals

== Second-generation biofuels ==
Second-generation biofuels use non-food substances as a feedstock carbon source. Examples include non-food plants, the inedible parts of food plants, and waste cooking fat. Unlike first-generation biofuels, they do not create problems in regard to the global food production.

- Biofuel Research Team (BRTeam), Iran
  - BRTeam is a multinational research team (Iran, Malaysia, Sweden, US, Belgium, UK), focused on various aspects of biofuel research, in particular, advanced reactor technologies.
- Blue Marble Energy, Seattle, Washington, United States
  - Technology: consortia of different non-GM bacteria
  - Feedstocks: "nearly any organic biomass"
  - Products: methane, nitrogen compounds, hydrogen
- Chemrec, Stockholm, Sweden
  - Technology: black liquor gasification
  - Feedstocks: black liquor from sulfate process or sulfite process pulp mills
  - Products: biomethanol, BioDME
- DuPont Danisco, Vonore, Tennessee, United States
  - Feedstocks: non-edible parts of plants
  - Products: ethanol
- Evoleum, St-Jean-sur-Richelieu, Quebec, Canada
  - Feedstocks: recycled vegetable oil
  - Products: biodiesel and biobunker
- Fujian Zhongde, part of China Clean Energy; Fuqing, Fujian, China
  - Feedstocks: waste vegetable oils
  - Products: biodiesel, chemicals
- Green BioFuels Corporation, Miami, Florida, United States
- Inbicon Americas, Conversion of Agricultural Residues such as wheat straw, corn stover and sugar bagasse, USA
  - Feedstocks: vegetable oil, animal fat, recycled cooking oil
  - Products: biodiesel, glycerol
- Gushan Environmental Energy, Beijing, Shanghai, Mianyang, Sichuan, Handan, Hebei, Fuzhou, and Fujian, China
  - Feedstocks: vegetable oil, animal fat, recycled cooking oil
  - Products: biodiesel, glycerol, plant asphalt, erucic acid, erucic amide
- Targray, Kirkland, Quebec, Canada
  - Feedstocks: recycled cooking oil, Midwest soy beans, North American canola, corn oil, mixed tallow
  - Products: biodiesel

== Second-generation biofuels with additional advantages ==
=== Algae and cyanobacteria fuels ===
The so-called "third-generation biofuels", similar to second-generation biofuels with an emphasize on the use of algae and cyanobacteria as a source of biofuel feedstocks, have an additional advantage as they take up a relatively small fraction of space when compared to first and second-generation biofuel sources, and may also help to reduce seawater eutrophication. They use algae to convert carbon dioxide into biomass.

- Algae Cluster, Europe
- Algenol, Bonita Springs, Florida; Baltimore; and Lee County, Florida, United States
  - Technology: algae grown in photobioreactors
  - Feedstocks: seawater, sunlight, carbon dioxide
  - Products: ethanol, freshwater
- Gevo, Douglas County, Colorado, United States
- Global Green Algae, part of Global Green Solutions. El Paso, Texas, United States
- GreenFuel Technologies Corporation, Cambridge, Massachusetts, United States, ceased operations in 2009
- Joule Unlimited, Cambridge, Massachusetts, United States
  - Feedstocks: water, sunlight, carbon dioxide
  - Technology: modified cyanobacteria and bioreactors
  - Products: diesel fuel
- PetroSun, Scottsdale, Arizona, United States
  - Technology: pyrolysis of organics, algae
  - Products: algal oil, hydrogen, charcoal fertilizer
- PowerFuel.de, Kaufbeuren, Swabia, Bavaria, Germany
  - Technology: hyper-ionizing
  - Feedstocks: UCO, CPO (used palm oil)
  - Products: oils, including ship and truck fuels
- Sapphire Energy, San Diego, California, United States
  - Technology: algae
  - Feedstocks: sunlight, carbon dioxide
  - Products: green crude
- Solazyme, South San Francisco, California, United States
  - Technology: algae
  - Feedstocks: plant matter
  - Products: oils, including aviation fuel
- Aurora Biofuels
- OriginOil
- PetroAlgae
- Solix
- Synthetic Genomics

=== Fourth-generation biofuels ===
Some fourth-generation technology pathways include pyrolysis, gasification, upgrading, solar-to-fuel, and genetic manipulation of organisms to secrete hydrocarbons.

- GreenFuel Technologies Corporation Cambridge, Massachusetts
  - Technology: developed a patented bioreactor system that uses nontoxic photosynthetic algae to take in smokestacks' flue gases and produce biofuels such as biodiesel, biogas and a dry fuel comparable to coal

Hydrocarbon plants or petroleum plants are plants which produce terpenoids as secondary metabolites that can be converted to gasoline-like fuels. Latex-producing members of the Euphorbiaceae such as Euphorbia lathyris and E. tirucalli and members of Apocynaceae have been studied for their potential energy uses.

Some other companies making 4th generation biofuels are:

- Algenol
- Joule Unlimited [defunct since 2017]
- LS9
- Naturally Scientific

=== Fifth-generation biofuels ===
In July 2022, a Research Association of Biomass Innovation for Next Generation Automobile Fuels was established by six Japanese automotive companies.

== See also ==
- Biofuel
- Biofuels by region
- List of algal fuel producers
- Renewable energy
