= List of algal fuel producers =

There are no commercial algal fuel producers.

== Asia ==
=== Iran ===
- Iran started investigating the production of algae from 2000. Scientific evidence shows that south Iran is the richest area in the world for cultivating algae, because of high humidity, sunny weather, large unused area and salty water.

== Mexico ==
BioFields

=== Spain ===
Bio Fuel Systems

=== United States ===
There are diverse companies developing biofuels from algae:

- Algae Systems
- Algenol
- Cellana
- Culture Fuels
- Inventure Chemical
- Photon8, advanced photobioreactor, genetics, cell-viable extraction

== See also ==
- List of biofuel companies and researchers
