= Algae fuel in the United States =

Fuel made from algae, a potential alternative to fossil fuels

Algae fuel in the United States, as with other countries, is under study as a source of biofuel.

== History ==
The Aquatic Species Program launched in 1978 was research program funded by the U.S. DoE, tasked with investigating the use of algae for the production of energy. The program initially focused efforts on the production of hydrogen, however, shifted primary research to studying oil production in 1982. From 1982 through its culmination, the majority of the program research was focused on the production of transportation fuels, notably biodiesel, from algae. In 1995, as part of the over-all efforts to lower budget demands, the DoE decided to end the program. Research stopped in 1996 and staff began compiling their research for publication.

In 2007, Congress passed the Energy Independence and Security Act, which required the United States to increase biofuel use. In accordance with this legislation, the Department of Energy dedicated $125 million to biofuel research in 2014 and brought the United States to use 45% of the world's biofuels, according to a 2014 article by Delia Gallinaro.

The Department of Energy created the Office of Energy Efficiency and Renewable Energy (EERE), which supports R&D on alternative fuels. Within EERE, the Bioenergy Technologies Office (BETO) created a Multi-Year Program Plan describing many specific challenges to overcome and goals to complete in order to increase the percentage of fuel in the United States coming from biological sources. BETO organized an Algae Program dedicated to researching and improving the viability of algae as an energy source. EERE's official page for the Algae Program lists goals including improving yields of algae strains while decreasing expenses of growing algae, filtering the algae from the water, extracting the oils, and processing the biofuel.

The United States Department of Agriculture has also been ordered to fund $881 million of biofuel research, so the organization partnered with the U.S. Navy and the Federal Aviation Administration with the goal of researching algae-based biofuels that can be "dropped-into" current military fuel infrastructure.

This financial incentive for algae biofuel research has facilitated the creation of many algae strains that can be converted to fuel. Current economic assessments cite large-scale pond-cultivated algae fuel prices ranging from at $0.42 to $7.50 per Liter. However, a 2012 economic analysis of commercialization potential and cost optimization determined a much smaller price range of $0.42 to $0.97 per Liter.

== Research ==
Universities working on oil from algae include

- The University of Texas at Austin.
- University of Maine
- University of Kansas
- Old Dominion University.
- University of California, Davis
- University of Kentucky

Researchers at the Center for Applied Energy Research (CAER) of the University of Kentucky are currently developing the algae-mediated conversion of coal-fired power plant flue gas to drop-in hydrocarbon fuel. Through their work, these researchers have proven that the carbon dioxide within flue gas from coal-fired power plants can be captured using algae, which can subsequently harvested and utilized, e.g. as a feedstock for the production of drop-in hydrocarbon fuels.

== Use of wastewater ==
At the Woods Hole Oceanographic Institution and the Harbor Branch Oceanographic Institution the wastewater from domestic and industrial sources contain rich organic compounds that are being used to accelerate the growth of algae.

Also the Department of Biological and Agricultural Engineering of the University of Georgia is exploring microalgal biomass production using industrial wastewater.

Algaewheel, based in Indianapolis, Indiana, presented a proposal to build a facility in Cedar Lake, Indiana that uses algae to treat municipal wastewater and uses the sludge byproduct to produce biofuel.

== Organizations ==
The National Algae Association (NAA) is a non-profit organization of algae researchers, algae production companies and the investment community who share the goal of commercializing algae oil as an alternative feedstock for the biofuels markets. The NAA gives its members a forum to efficiently evaluate various algae technologies for potential early stage company opportunities.

== See also ==
- Energy and the environment
- List of algal fuel producers
- Renewable energy in the United States
