= Puerto Libertad, Sonora =

Fishing town and port in Sonora, Mexico

Puerto Libertad
- Location in Sonora Puerto Libertad (Sonora)
- Coordinates: 29°54′15″N 112°40′59″W
- Country: Mexico
- State: Sonora
- Municipality: Pitiquito

Population (2010)
  - Total: 2,782

Puerto Libertad is a fishing town and port of the Mexican state of Sonora, Mexico. It is located on the north coast of the Gulf of California, in the municipality of Pitiquito. Houston based Mexico Pacific Limited LLC has been building an LNG plant there since 2023 to import natural gas from Texas and Arizona.

== Population ==
According to the results of the Census of Population and Housing 2005 Puerto Libertad population is 2,823 people, 1,489 of which are men and 1,334 women.

== Economy ==
It is a place dedicated to fishing activities. Puerto Libertad is located in the Sonoran Desert environment, which in conjunction with the sea is increasingly attracting the development of tourism.

It also hosts one of the largest power plants in Mexico, operated by the national utility company the Comisión Federal de Electricidad. Because the plant is aged, heavy fuel burning, the town is the site of a proposed algal biofuel project which would produce ethanol. The system works on exhaust from the electric power plant. The two companies working on the project are an American Algenol technology and Mexican operator owner Biofields. Puerto Libertad is also the site of a solar energy project being developed by Sonora Energy Group Hermosillo, S.A. de C.V.

In 2017, Houston-based Mexico Pacific Limited LLC bought 300 acres to build an LNG plant for importing natural gas from the US. They received a permit to export first in 2018 and asked for an expanded export permit in 2022. In 2023, Exxon said it would like to sell from the Sonora facility. as well as Shell, and as of May 2023, construction began.

== Geography ==
Puerto Libertad is located at the geographic coordinates 29 ° 54'15 "N 112 ° 40'59" W / 29.90417, -112.68306, at an altitude of 10 meters above sea level, the distance that separates it from the capital state, the city of Hermosillo, is 416 kilometers and they are connected through the so-called coastal road.

=== Climate ===
Puerto Libertad has a desert climate (Köppen climate classification BWh).

Climate data for Puerto Libertad, Sonora (1981–2010), extremes (1960–present)
Month	Jan	Feb	Mar	Apr	May	Jun	Jul	Aug	Sep	Oct	Nov	Dec	Year
Record high °C (°F)	29.0 (84.2)	32.0 (89.6)	33.5 (92.3)	41.0 (105.8)	42.0 (107.6)	44.0 (111.2)	43.0 (109.4)	44.0 (111.2)	44.0 (111.2)	42.0 (107.6)	38.0 (100.4)	32.2 (90.0)	44.0 (111.2)
Mean daily maximum °C (°F)	19.9 (67.8)	21.3 (70.3)	23.4 (74.1)	26.6 (79.9)	29.4 (84.9)	33.0 (91.4)	34.9 (94.8)	35.5 (95.9)	34.6 (94.3)	30.0 (86.0)	24.7 (76.5)	20.5 (68.9)	27.8 (82.0)
Daily mean °C (°F)	13.5 (56.3)	14.8 (58.6)	17.0 (62.6)	20.0 (68.0)	22.9 (73.2)	27.1 (80.8)	30.6 (87.1)	31.1 (88.0)	29.4 (84.9)	23.8 (74.8)	18.1 (64.6)	14.1 (57.4)	21.9 (71.4)
Mean daily minimum °C (°F)	7.2 (45.0)	8.3 (46.9)	10.6 (51.1)	13.3 (55.9)	16.4 (61.5)	21.1 (70.0)	26.4 (79.5)	26.8 (80.2)	24.2 (75.6)	17.7 (63.9)	11.4 (52.5)	7.7 (45.9)	15.9 (60.6)
Record low °C (°F)	−6.0 (21.2)	0.0 (32.0)	1.0 (33.8)	3.0 (37.4)	4.5 (40.1)	7.5 (45.5)	12.5 (54.5)	13.5 (56.3)	11.0 (51.8)	2.5 (36.5)	1.5 (34.7)	−1.0 (30.2)	−6.0 (21.2)
Average precipitation mm (inches)	13.1 (0.52)	6.8 (0.27)	10.3 (0.41)	1.9 (0.07)	0.0 (0.0)	0.3 (0.01)	10.9 (0.43)	13.3 (0.52)	12.5 (0.49)	16.8 (0.66)	8.3 (0.33)	21.2 (0.83)	115.4 (4.54)
Average precipitation days (≥ 0.1 mm)	2.3	1.3	1.2	0.5	0.0	0.2	1.7	1.8	1.3	1.3	1.3	2.5	15.4
Source: Servicio Meteorológico Nacional

== Gallery ==
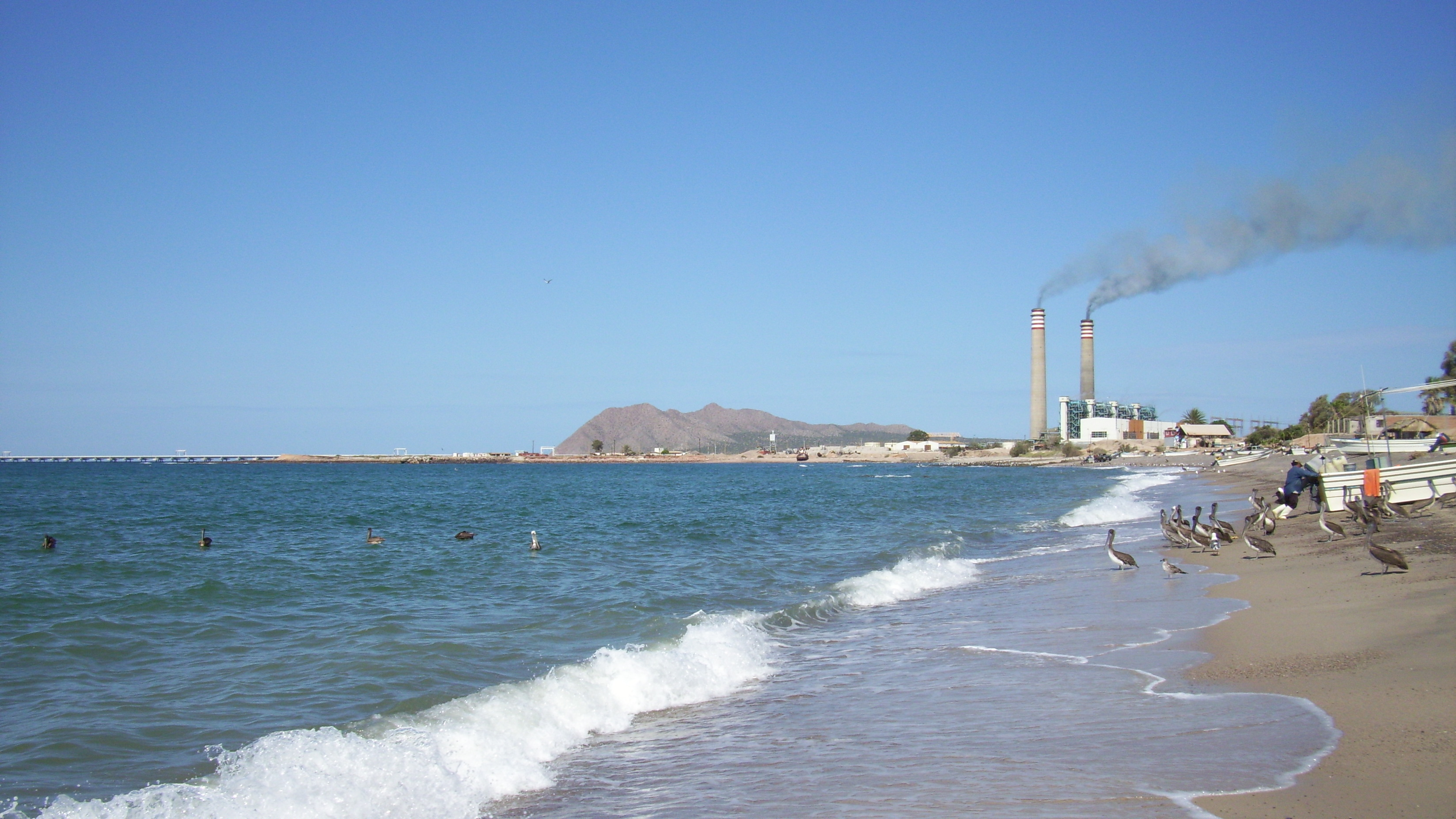
Beach and power plant at Puerto Libertad
