= Greenfuel =

Greenfuel may refer to:

- GreenFuel Technologies Corporation
- Biofuel, or green fuel
