= Isaac Berzin =

Israeli scientist and entrepreneur

- איציק ברזין
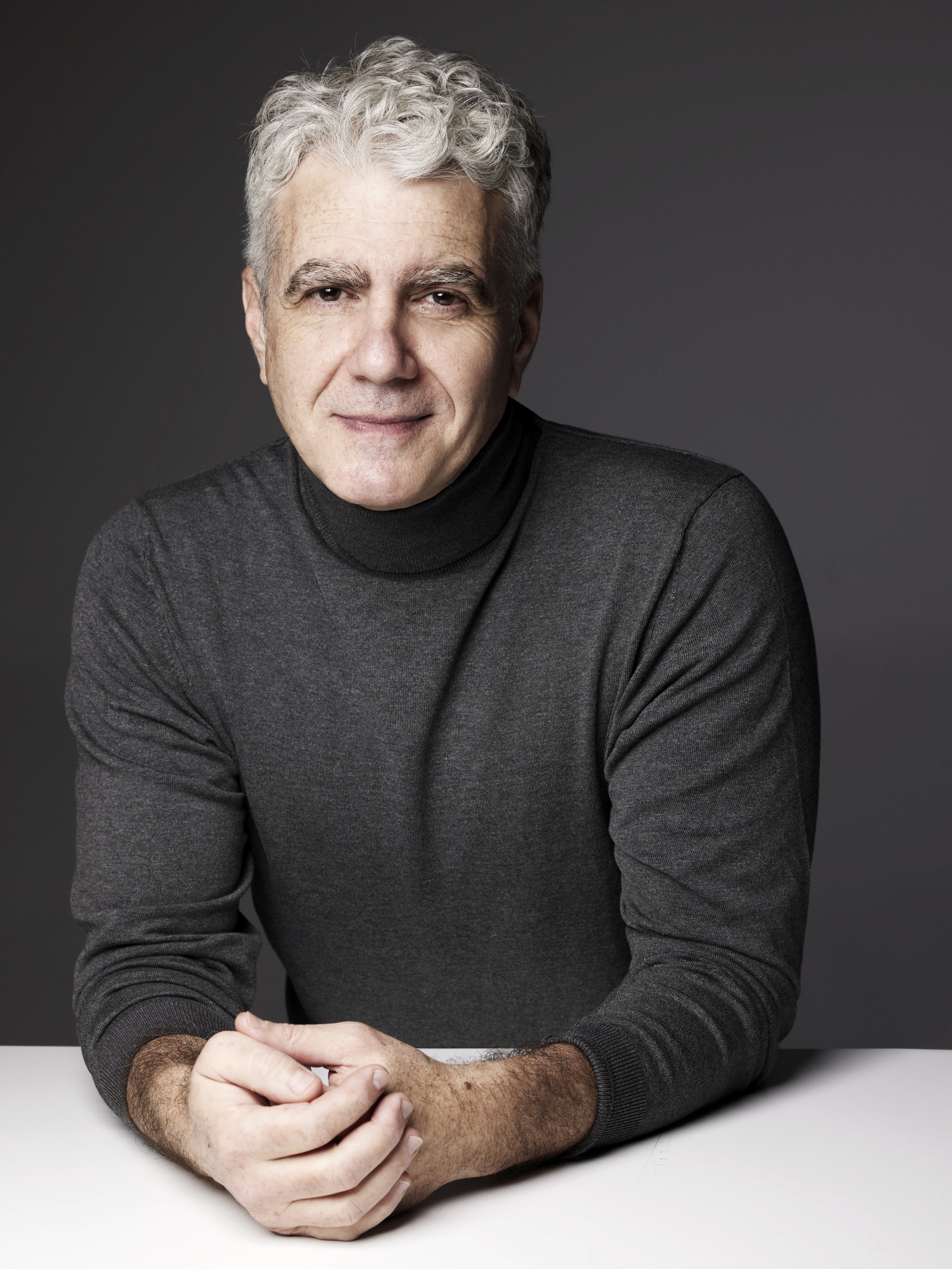
- Isaac Berzin - איציק ברזין
- Born: December 12, 1967 (age 58)
- Citizenship: Israeli
- Known for: Sustainable algae cultivation
- Awards: TIME 100 list of most influential people in politics, business and science (2008).
- Scientific career
- Fields: Professor of Chemical Engineering and Biotechnology

Isaac Berzin (Hebrew: איציק ברזין; born December 12, 1967) is an Israeli scientist and entrepreneur.

== Academic and professional life ==
Berzin is a scientist and entrepreneur in the field of sustainable microalgae. During his early career years, his research was focused on biofuels, and in recent years his focus shifted to sustainable aquafeed, nutrition and human health products. Berzin is currently the Founder and Chief Technology Officer of VAXA Technologies LTD, producing Omega-3 and protein rich microalgae for feed and food applications. The microalgae are sustainably cultivated in an integrated process within one of the world's largest geothermal power plants, located in Hellisheiði, Iceland.
He is a co-author, together with Nobel Prize Laureate, William Moomaw, of the Industrial Biotechnology cover paper “Cutting out the Middle Fish”, positioning sustainably cultivated microalgae as next generation superfood. In 2012 Isaac Berzin Founded Qualitas Health Inc. He was Chief Technology Officer of The company that produces and markets the first FDA-approved Omega-3 dietary ingredient ever produced from photosynthetic algae.

Berzin founded in 2001 the first algae-to-biofuel company in the world, GreenFuel Technologies Corporation, that aimed to use algae to eat up carbon emissions and to produce renewable energy. This company has been closed down in May 2009. Prof. Berzin is an Affiliated Scientist at MIT, where he worked at the Center for Space Research on a NASA sponsored project, developing bioreactors for the International Space Station. He completed his Post-Doctoral research at biomedical engineering lab of Prof. Robert S. Langer lab at MIT. Isaac is a faculty member at the Department of Engineering, Reykjavik University, Iceland and the Faculty for Marine Sciences, Ruppin Academic Center, Israel.

Berzin was a senior faculty member at the Interdisciplinary Center in Herzliya and established an Israel-based international institute to formulate alternative energy policies. In June 2008, Berzin addressed 130 members of the "Cleantech Israel" business network. He discussed his experience at GreenFuel Technologies and Israel's potential to be a world leader in renewable energy. As a senior fellow at the Van Leer Jerusalem Institute, Berzin led the Solar-Ketchup Project in 2011: A team of Israeli, Palestinian and Jordanian researchers, working together to explore the techno-economics of semi-transparent photovoltaic cells for co-production of solar electricity and tomato farming.

== Honors and awards ==
Berzin was named one the 100 most influential people in politics, business and science in 2008 by the Time Magazine for his work in alga-culture. Prof. Berzin's work in sustainable alga-culture has won awards, including the Frost and Sullivan Award, Platts Global Energy Award and American Society of Competitiveness (ASC) Awards.
