= David Berry (inventor) =

American businessperson

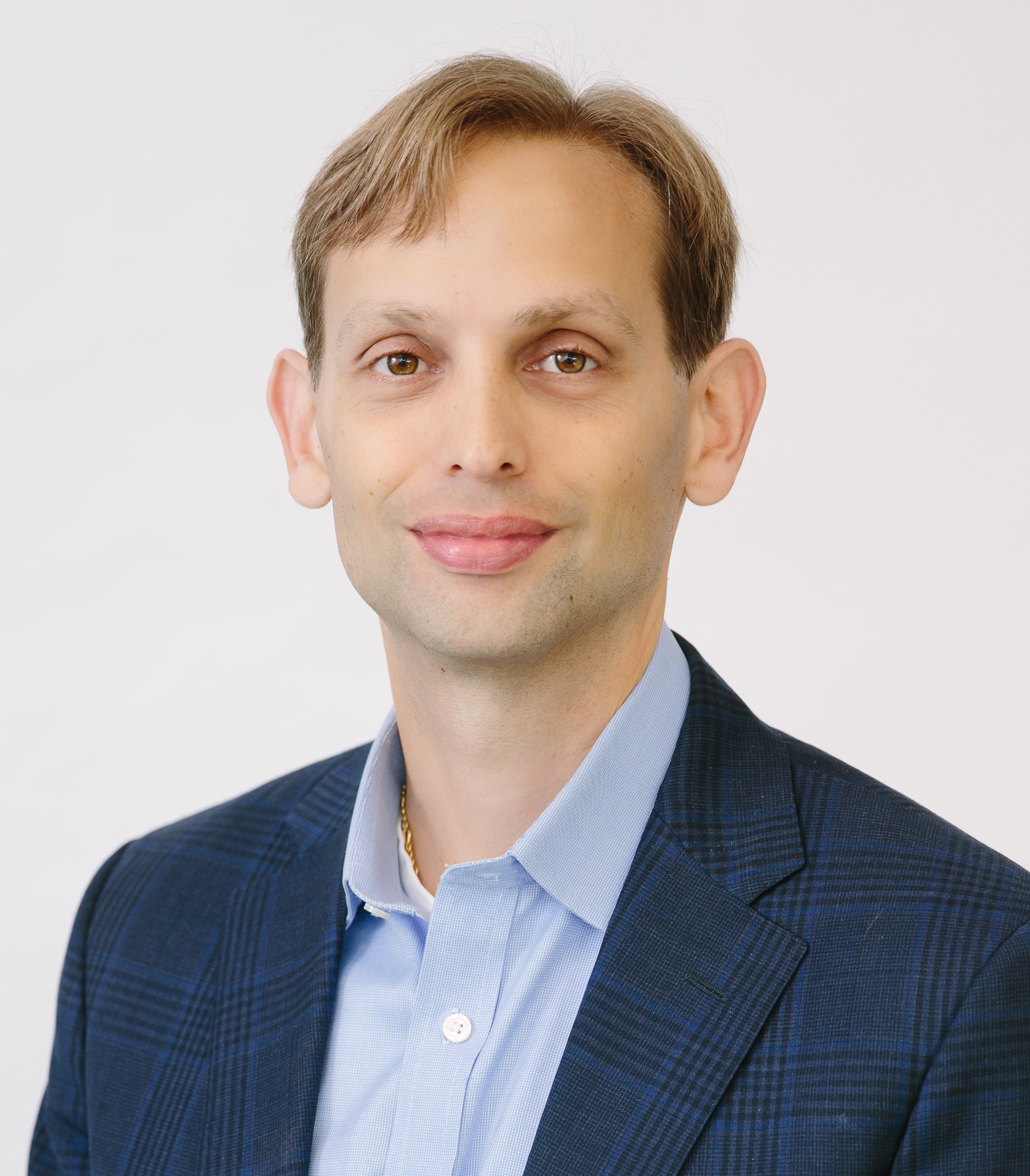
- Berry in 2015
- Born: February 10, 1978 (age 48); New York City, New York
- Education: MIT, Harvard Medical School
- Occupations: CEO, innovator, venture capitalist, entrepreneur, inventor,

David Berry (born February 10, 1978) is an American entrepreneur and business executive. He has co-founded Valo Health, Seres Therapeutics, Indigo Agriculture, Axcella Health, and contributed to the early development of Moderna.

== Early life and education ==
Berry was born in 1978. He graduated Hackley School in Tarrytown, NY in 1996. Berry graduated with a S.B. Phi Beta Kappa and Sigma Xi from the Massachusetts Institute of Technology in 2000. He earned his M.D. from Harvard Medical School and his PhD from the Massachusetts Institute of Technology with Robert Langer and Ram Sasisekharan.

== Career ==
Berry joined Flagship Pioneering in 2005, a Cambridge, Massachusetts based venture capital firm that funds early-stage start-ups in healthcare and sustainability, where he served as a general partner.

In 2007, Berry founded Joule Unlimited.

In 2009, Berry founded Axcella Health, which develops a new approach to treating complex diseases using Endogenous Metabolic Modulators (EMMs) as a new therapeutic product class.

In March 2010, and again in March 2011, Joule Unlimited was named by Technology Review as one of the 50 Most Innovative Companies.

In 2012, Berry founded Seres Therapeutics, which pioneered microbiome therapeutics. The company raised over $130M as a private company, including a $65M investment from Nestle Health Sciences. Seres publicly listed on the Nasdaq under the symbol MCRB in June 2015, raising $134M. Seres signed a partnership valued at $2B with Nestle Health Sciences in early 2016.

In 2014, Berry founded Indigo Agriculture to create seed treatments that optimize the health of a plant to increase yield. The same year, Berry founded Evelo Biosciences.

Berry founded Valo Health in 2019.

Berry is a founding member of the Leadership Council of the United Nations Sustainable Development Solutions Network, which authored the Sustainable Development Goals.

== Honors ==
He was named as the Innovator of the Year in 2007 by the MIT Technology Review TR35 list for his creation of LS9. Berry was selected as a 2014 Young Global Leader by the World Economic Forum. Additionally Berry has been recognized by the US State Department as one of 12 Innovators Helping Reshape Reality.

Berry is a trustee at the Hackley School, and was previously a board member of the Massachusetts Institute of Technology from 2006 to 2011. David has also served as a board member of the Juventas New Music Ensemble and of the Boston Philharmonic Orchestra.
