= GFT (disambiguation) =

GFT may refer to:

- French Guiana Time
- Glasgow Film Theatre, Scotland
- Google Flu Trends
- Gafat language, ISO 639-3 code
- GreenFuel Technologies Corporation
- Group field theory
- Former Gulfstream International Airlines, Florida, US, ICAO code
