= Algaeus =

The "Algaeus" was the moniker for a modified Toyota Prius that ran on algal fuel.

The vehicle was produced by Sapphire Energy, maker of an algae-based replacement for gasoline and jet fuel, and was unveiled in front of San Francisco's City Hall on September 8, 2008. The algae was provided by Sapphire Energy and refined by Syntroleum. The vehicle conducted a 10-city, 3,750-mile pilot demonstration to raise awareness for alternative fuels, which culminated with the New York City premiere of the documentary film Fuel (film), directed by filmmaker and activist Josh Tickell.

The vehicle was intended to provide a model for the viability of algae-based biofuels as a market alternative to fossil fuels. The coast-to-coast promotional tour used only 25 gallons of algal biofuel on an unmodified engine. However, algal biofuel fuel only accounted for 5% of the overall diesel blend, the remainder of which was derived from fossil fuels. The vehicle achieved 147 miles per gallon (mpg) city in plug-in electric hybrid mode (PHEV) and 52 mpg highway in hybrid mode, according to Sapphire Energy.

The endeavor was driven by optimistic market forecasts that predicted billion-gallon scale production of algae fuels by 2014. These estimates and associated investments, which pre-dated the mass commercialization of electric vehicles, did not materialize as predicted.

In this context, the Algaeus, which was never developed for commercial production, could be seen as emblematic of what has been described as "The Great Algae Biofuel Bubble" of 2005 - 2012.
