= Martek Biosciences Corporation =

Former pharmaceutical company

- Formerly: Algatex
- Traded as: Nasdaq: MATK
- Industry: Pharmaceutical R&D
- Founded: May 1985
- Founder: David Kyle, Richard Radmer and Paul Behrens
- Defunct: 2011
- Fate: Acquired by DSM
- Successor: Royal DSM NV
- Headquarters: Columbia, Maryland
- Products: DHA and ARA, extracted from fungus
- Brands: Formulaid
- Revenue: $185 million (2004)
- Net income: $47 million (2004)
- Number of employees: 600 (2005)

Martek Biosciences Corporation was a pharmaceutical company based in Columbia, Maryland. It was acquired by Royal DSM NV in 2011, and produces nutritional ingredients for the food, beverage, dietary supplement and early life nutrition industries. By 2004, the company had a 70% market share in the United States for baby formula supplements, and about 30% globally.

The history of this company begins in outer space. In the early-1980s, Martin Marietta began investigating the potential benefits that algae might bring to long-term space flight, having been contracted by NASA under the Closed Environment Life Support System (CELSS) program. The scientists involved realized the broader potential for algae in human health, and when Martin Marietta ended their involvement with the CELSS program in 1985 (they left bioscience research altogether), they left the company and formed Algatex in May 1985, which they renamed to Martek by September of the same year. "Martek" was in fact the name of the Martin Marietta division they had been affiliated with originally. Martek research identified the microalgae Crypthecodinium cohnii, which produces high levels of DHA, and the soil fungus Mortierella alpina that yields ARA, both being important human nutrients. The company's first licensing agreement came in 1992 for commercialized versions of these nutrients, marketed as life'sDHA and life'sARA. Martek subsequently went public in 1994. This same year, the first commercial products supplemented with Formulaid were sold in Europe.

Martek was one of the thousands of company's who have received assistance from the Small Business Administration. In fact, it received around 40 SBIR grants in its early years, constituting the firm's primary source of funds for Research & Development. The company made its first revenue seventeen years after its formation.

As of 1996, the company's leading product was Formulaid, a dietary supplement containing DHA and ARA, "an algae-based, vegetable-like oil". The company was granted a U.S. patent for Formulaid formulation in 1994. (Note: US 5374657 "Microbial oil mixtures and uses thereof .") By 2005, production of the supplement was done in the United States at plants in Kingstree, South Carolina and Winchester, Kentucky. (Note: Second page of "How algae grow baby brains...") In 2004, more than 50% of the company's revenue came from sales to Mead Johnson, maker of Enfamil Lipil. By 2006, Martek had contracted with Mead Johnson to be its exclusive supplier of DHA and ARA supplements for infant formula products.

With respect to business model, the infant formula market has been "relatively stable", allowing for firm prediction of revenue and production needs; however, stepping into the general food market (e.g. breakfast cereal additives) would lead to a substantial increase in uncertainty from a financial and supply point of view. Addition of Martek's supplement to baby formula can result in a 10% to 20% price increase over the base product. Martek's heavy revenue reliance on Mead Johnson had, in the mid-2000s, led to some investor concerns. As of 2007 and 2009, supplements for infant formula accounted for 91% of the company's sales, bringing one commentator to note the firm was a "pure play" investment target. In February 2010, Martek acquired Amerifit, a dietary supplement company, in a bid to expand beyond supplements for baby food.

In 2011, Martek was acquired by DSM for $1.1 billion as part of their expansion out of bulk chemical manufacture and sales.

As of 2005, the company typically marked its own DHA, but contracted out for the manufacture of ARA, which requires supplemental fermentation of the source fungus. ARA is a commonly made supplement across many manufacturers. DHA, on the other hand, has its main competition in fish oil supplements, where DHA has the advantage of being tasteless and odorless compared to fish oil.
