= National Algae Association =

Algae production trade organization

The National Algae Association is a United States non-profit algae production trade organization for commercially minded algae researchers, algae producers and equipment companies.

Created in January 2008 and headquartered in Houston, Texas, the association seeks to co-ordinate research and development efforts for commercial algal fuel applications. It also hosts conferences for the presentation of scientific papers on algal fuel.

== See also ==
- Algae fuel in the United States
