= Algae fuel =

Use of algae as a source of energy-rich oils

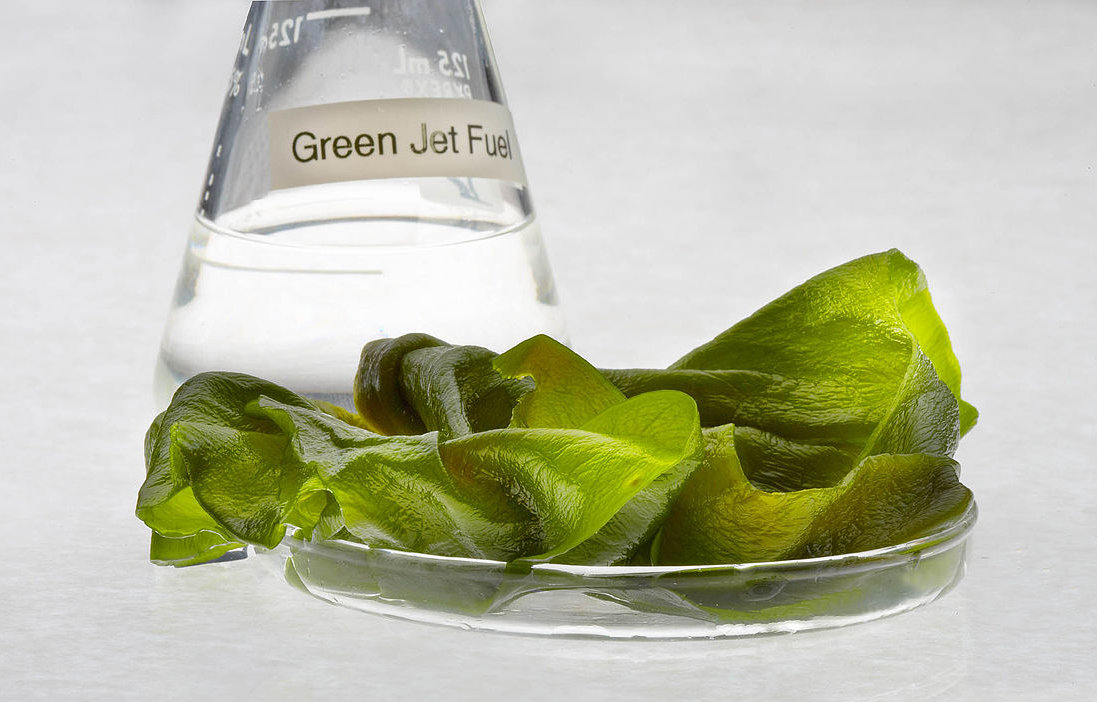
A conical flask of "green" jet fuel made from algae

Algae fuel, algal biofuel, or algal oil is an alternative to liquid fossil fuels that use algae as the source of energy-rich oils. Also, algae fuels are an alternative to commonly known biofuel sources, such as corn and sugarcane. When made from seaweed (macroalgae) it can be known as seaweed fuel or seaweed oil. These fuels have no practical significance but remain an aspirational target in the biofuels research area.

== History ==
In 1942, Harder and Von Witsch were the first to propose that microalgae be grown as a source of lipids for food or fuel. Following World War II, research began in the US, Germany, Japan, England, and Israel on culturing techniques and engineering systems for growing microalgae on larger scales, particularly species in the genus Chlorella. Meanwhile, H. G. Aach showed that Chlorella pyrenoidosa could be induced via nitrogen starvation to accumulate as much as 70% of its dry weight as lipids. Since the need for alternative transportation fuel had subsided after World War II, research at this time focused on culturing algae as a food source or, in some cases, for wastewater treatment.

Interest in the application of algae for biofuels was rekindled during the oil embargo and oil price surges of the 1970s, leading the US Department of Energy to initiate the Aquatic Species Program in 1978. The Aquatic Species Program spent $25 million over 18 years to develop liquid transportation fuel from algae that would be price-competitive with petroleum-derived fuels. The research program focused on microalgae cultivation in open outdoor ponds, systems that are low in cost but vulnerable to environmental disturbances like temperature swings and biological invasions. 3,000 algal strains were collected from around the country and screened for desirable properties such as high productivity, lipid content, and thermal tolerance, and the most promising strains were included in the SERI microalgae collection at the Solar Energy Research Institute (SERI) in Golden, Colorado and used for further research. Among the program's most significant findings were that rapid growth and high lipid production were "mutually exclusive" since the former required high nutrients and the latter required low nutrients. The final report suggested that genetic engineering may be necessary to be able to overcome this and other natural limitations of algal strains and that the ideal species might vary with place and season. Although it was successfully demonstrated that large-scale production of algae for fuel in outdoor ponds was feasible, the program failed to do so at a cost that would be competitive with petroleum, especially as oil prices sank in the 1990s. Even in the best-case scenario, it was estimated that unextracted algal oil would cost $59–186 per barrel, while petroleum cost less than $20 per barrel in 1995. Therefore, under budget pressure in 1996, the Aquatic Species Program was abandoned.

Other contributions to algal biofuels research have come indirectly from projects focusing on different applications of algal cultures. For example, in the 1990s Japan's Research Institute of Innovative Technology for the Earth (RITE) implemented a research program with the goal of developing systems to fix CO_{2} using microalgae. Although the goal was not energy production, several studies produced by RITE demonstrated that algae could be grown using flue gas from power plants as a CO_{2} source, an important development for algal biofuel research. Other work focusing on harvesting hydrogen gas, methane, or ethanol from algae, as well as nutritional supplements and pharmaceutical compounds, has also helped inform research on biofuel production from algae.

Following the disbanding of the Aquatic Species Program in 1996, there was a relative lull in algal biofuel research. Still, various projects were funded in the US by the Department of Energy, Department of Defense, National Science Foundation, Department of Agriculture, National Laboratories, state funding, and private funding, as well as in other countries. More recently, rising oil prices in the 2000s spurred a revival of interest in algal biofuels and US federal funding has increased, numerous research projects are being funded in Australia, New Zealand, Europe, the Middle East, and other parts of the world.

In December 2022, ExxonMobil, the last large oil company to invest in algae biofuels, ended its research funding.

In March 2023, researchers said that the commercialization of biofuels would require several billion dollars of funding, plus a long-term dedication to overcoming what appear to be fundamental biological limitations of wild organisms. Most researchers believe that large scale production of biofuels is either "a decade, and more likely two decades, away."

== Food supplementation ==
Algal oil is used as a source of fatty acid supplementation in food products, as it contains mono- and polyunsaturated fats, in particular EPA and DHA. Its DHA content is roughly equivalent to that of salmon based fish oil.

== Fuels ==
Algae can be converted into various types of fuels, depending on the production technologies and the part of the cells used. The lipid, or oily part of the algae biomass can be extracted and converted into biodiesel through a process similar to that used for any other vegetable oil, or converted in a refinery into "drop-in" replacements for petroleum-based fuels. Alternatively or following lipid extraction, the carbohydrate content of algae can be fermented into bioethanol or butanol fuel.

=== Biodiesel ===
Biodiesel is a diesel fuel derived from animal or plant lipids (oils and fats). Studies have shown that some species of algae can produce 60% or more of their dry weight in the form of oil. Because the cells grow in aqueous suspension, where they have more efficient access to water, CO_{2} and dissolved nutrients, microalgae are capable of producing large amounts of biomass and usable oil in either high rate algal ponds or photobioreactors. This oil can then be turned into biodiesel which could be sold for use in automobiles. Regional production of microalgae and processing into biofuels will provide economic benefits to rural communities.

As they do not have to produce structural compounds such as cellulose for leaves, stems, or roots, and because they can be grown floating in a rich nutritional medium, microalgae can have faster growth rates than terrestrial crops. Also, they can convert a much higher fraction of their biomass to oil than conventional crops, e.g. 60% versus 2-3% for soybeans. The per unit area yield of oil from algae is estimated to be from 58,700 to 136,900 L/ha/year, depending on lipid content, which is 10 to 23 times as high as the next highest yielding crop, oil palm, at 5 950 L/ha/year.

The U.S. Department of Energy's Aquatic Species Program, 1978–1996, focused on biodiesel from microalgae. The final report suggested that biodiesel could be the only viable method by which to produce enough fuel to replace current world diesel usage. If algae-derived biodiesel were to replace the annual global production of 1.1bn tons of conventional diesel then a land mass of 57.3 million hectares would be required, which would be highly favorable compared to other biofuels.

=== Renewable diesel ===
Algae can be used to produce 'green diesel' (also known as renewable diesel, hydrotreating vegetable oil or hydrogen-derived renewable diesel) through a hydrotreating refinery process that breaks molecules down into shorter hydrocarbon chains used in diesel engines. It has the same chemical properties as petroleum-based diesel meaning that it does not require new engines, pipelines or infrastructure to distribute and use. It has yet to be produced at a cost that is competitive with petroleum. While hydrotreating is currently the most common pathway to produce fuel-like hydrocarbons via decarboxylation/decarbonylation, there is an alternative process offering a number of important advantages over hydrotreating. In this regard, the work of Crocker et al. and Lercher et al. is particularly noteworthy. For oil refining, research is underway for catalytic conversion of renewable fuels by decarboxylation. As the oxygen is present in crude oil at rather low levels, of the order of 0.5%, deoxygenation in petroleum refining is not of much concern, and no catalysts are specifically formulated for oxygenates hydrotreating. Hence, one of the critical technical challenges to make the hydrodeoxygenation of algae oil process economically feasible is related to the research and development of effective catalysts.

=== Biobutanol ===
Butanol can be made from algae or diatoms using only a solar powered biorefinery. This fuel has an energy density 10% less than gasoline, and greater than that of either ethanol or methanol. In most gasoline engines, butanol can be used in place of gasoline with no modifications. In several tests, butanol consumption is similar to that of gasoline, and when blended with gasoline, provides better performance and corrosion resistance than that of ethanol or E85.

The green waste left over from the algae oil extraction can be used to produce butanol. In addition, it has been shown that macroalgae (seaweeds) can be fermented by bacteria of genus Clostridia to butanol and other solvents. Transesterification of seaweed oil (into biodiesel) is also possible with species such as Chaetomorpha linum, Ulva lactuca, and Enteromorpha compressa (Ulva).

The following species are being investigated as suitable species from which to produce ethanol and/or butanol:

- Alaria esculenta
- Laminaria saccharina
- Palmaria palmata

=== Biogasoline ===
Biogasoline is gasoline produced from biomass. Like traditionally produced gasoline, it contains between 6 (hexane) and 12 (dodecane) carbon atoms per molecule and can be used in internal-combustion engines.

=== Biogas ===
Biogas is composed mainly of methane (CH_{4}) and carbon dioxide (CO_{2}), with some traces of hydrogen sulphide, oxygen, nitrogen, and hydrogen. Macroalgae has high methane production rate compared to plant biomass. Biogas production from macroalgae is more technically viable compared to other fuels, but it is not economically viable due to the high cost of macroalgae feedstock. Carbohydrate and protein in microalgae can be converted into biogas through anaerobic digestion, which includes hydrolysis, fermentation, and methanogenesis steps. The conversion of algal biomass into methane can potentially recover as much energy as it obtains, but it is more profitable when the algal lipid content is lower than 40%. Biogas production from microalgae is relatively low because of the high ratio of protein in microalgae, but microalgae can be co-digested with high C/N ratio products such as wastepaper. Another method to produce biogas is through gasification, where hydrocarbon is converted to syngas through a partial oxidation reaction at high temperature (typically 800 °C to 1000 °C). Gasification is usually performed with catalysts. Uncatalyzed gasification requires temperature to be about 1300 °C. Syngas can be burnt directly to produce energy or used a fuel in turbine engines. It can also be used as feedstock for other chemical productions.

=== Methane ===
Methane, the main constituent of natural gas, can be produced from algae by various methods, namely gasification, pyrolysis and anaerobic digestion. In gasification and pyrolysis methods methane is extracted under high temperature and pressure. Anaerobic digestion is a straightforward method involved in decomposition of algae into simple components then transforming it into fatty acids using microbes like acidogenic bacteria followed by removing any solid particles and finally adding methanogenic archaea to release a gas mixture containing methane. A number of studies have successfully shown that biomass from microalgae can be converted into biogas via anaerobic digestion. Therefore, in order to improve the overall energy balance of microalgae cultivation operations, it has been proposed to recover the energy contained in waste biomass via anaerobic digestion to methane for generating electricity.

=== Ethanol ===
The Algenol system which is being commercialized by BioFields in Puerto Libertad, Sonora, Mexico utilizes seawater and industrial exhaust to produce ethanol. Porphyridium cruentum also have shown to be potentially suitable for ethanol production due to its capacity for accumulating large amount of carbohydrates.

=== Jet fuel ===
Trials of using algae as biofuel were carried out by Lufthansa and Virgin Atlantic as early as 2008, although there is little evidence that using algae is a reasonable source for jet biofuels. By 2015, cultivation of fatty acid methyl esters and alkenones from the algae, Isochrysis, was under research as a possible jet biofuel feedstock.

=== Algae-based energy harvester ===
In May 2022, scientists at University of Cambridge announced they created an algae energy harvester, that uses natural sunlight to power a small microprocessor, initially powering the processor for six months, and then kept going for a full year. The device, which is about the size of AA battery, is a small container with water and blue green algae. The device does not generate a huge amount of power, but it can be used for Internet of Things devices, eliminating the need for traditional batteries such as lithium-ion batteries. The goal is to have more an environmentally friendly power source that can be used in remote areas.

== Species ==
Research into algae for the mass-production of oil focuses mainly on microalgae (organisms capable of photosynthesis that are less than 0.4 mm in diameter, including the diatoms and cyanobacteria) as opposed to macroalgae, such as seaweed. The preference for microalgae has come about due largely to their less complex structure, fast growth rates, and high oil-content (for some species). However, some research is being done into using seaweeds for biofuels, probably due to the high availability of this resource.

As of 2012 researchers across various locations worldwide have started investigating the following species for their suitability as a mass oil-producers:

- Botryococcus braunii
- Chlorella
- Dunaliella tertiolecta
- Gracilaria
- Pleurochrysis carterae (also called CCMP647).
- Sargassum, with 10 times the output volume of Gracilaria.

The amount of oil each strain of algae produces varies widely. Note the following microalgae and their various oil yields:

- Ankistrodesmus TR-87: 28–40% dry weight
- Botryococcus braunii: 29–75% dw
- Chlorella sp.: 29%dw
- Chlorella protothecoides(autotrophic/heterotrophic): 15–55% dw
- Crypthecodinium cohnii: 20%dw
- Cyclotella DI- 35: 42%dw
- Dunaliella tertiolecta : 36–42%dw
- Hantzschia DI-160: 66%dw
- Nannochloris: 31(6–63)%dw
- Nannochloropsis : 46(31–68)%dw
  - Nannochloropsis and biofuels
- Neochloris oleoabundans: 35–54%dw
- Nitzschia TR-114: 28–50%dw
- Phaeodactylum tricornutum: 31%dw
- Scenedesmus TR-84: 45%dw
- Schizochytrium 50–77%dw
- Stichococcus: 33(9–59)%dw
- Tetraselmis suecica: 15–32%dw
- Thalassiosira pseudonana: (21–31)%dw

In addition, due to its high growth-rate, Ulva has been investigated as a fuel for use in the SOFT cycle, (SOFT stands for Solar Oxygen Fuel Turbine), a closed-cycle power-generation system suitable for use in arid, subtropical regions.

Other species used include Clostridium saccharoperbutylacetonicum, Sargassum, Gracilaria, Prymnesium parvum, and Euglena gracilis.

== Nutrients and growth inputs ==
Light is what algae primarily need for growth as it is the most limiting factor. Many companies are investing for developing systems and technologies for providing artificial light. One of them is OriginOil that has developed a Helix BioReactorTM that features a rotating vertical shaft with low-energy lights arranged in a helix pattern. Water temperature also influences the metabolic and reproductive rates of algae. Although most algae grow at low rate when the water temperature gets lower, the biomass of algal communities can get large due to the absence of grazing organisms. The modest increases in water current velocity may also affect rates of algae growth since the rate of nutrient uptake and boundary layer diffusion increases with current velocity.

Other than light and water, phosphorus, nitrogen, and certain micronutrients are also useful and essential in growing algae. Nitrogen and phosphorus are the two most significant nutrients required for algal productivity, but other nutrients such as carbon and silica are additionally required. Of the nutrients required, phosphorus is one of the most essential ones as it is used in numerous metabolic processes. The microalgae D. tertiolecta was analyzed to see which nutrient affects its growth the most. The concentrations of phosphorus (P), iron (Fe), cobalt (Co), zinc (Zn), manganese (Mn) and molybdenum (Mo), magnesium (Mg), calcium (Ca), silicon (Si) and sulfur (S) concentrations were measured daily using inductively coupled plasma (ICP) analysis. Among all these elements being measured, phosphorus resulted in the most dramatic decrease, with a reduction of 84% over the course of the culture. This result indicates that phosphorus, in the form of phosphate, is required in high amounts by all organisms for metabolism.

There are two enrichment media that have been extensively used to grow most species of algae: Walne medium and the Guillard's F/_{2} medium. These commercially available nutrient solutions may reduce time for preparing all the nutrients required to grow algae. However, due to their complexity in the process of generation and high cost, they are not used for large-scale culture operations. Therefore, enrichment media used for mass production of algae contain only the most important nutrients with agriculture-grade fertilizers rather than laboratory-grade fertilizers.

== Cultivation ==
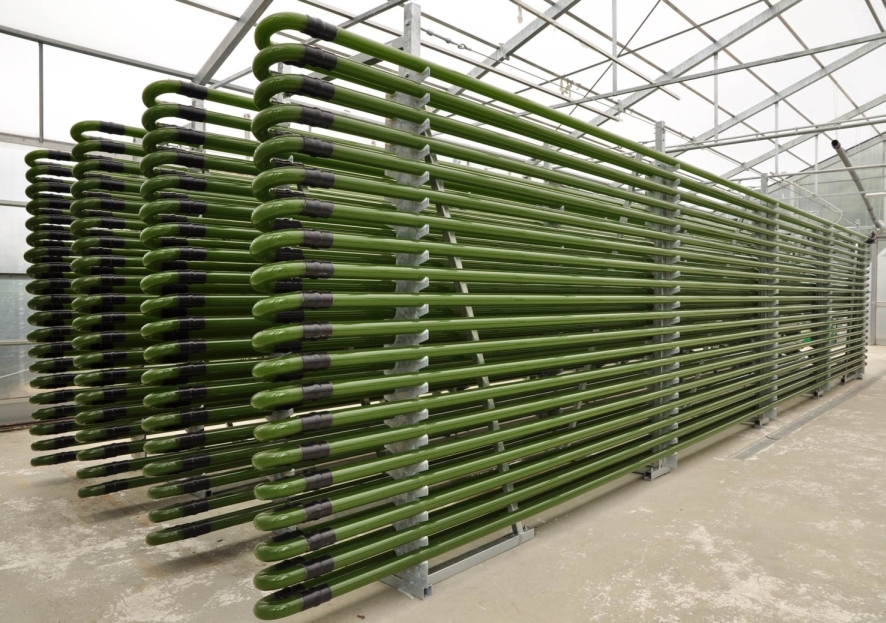
Photobioreactor from glass tubes

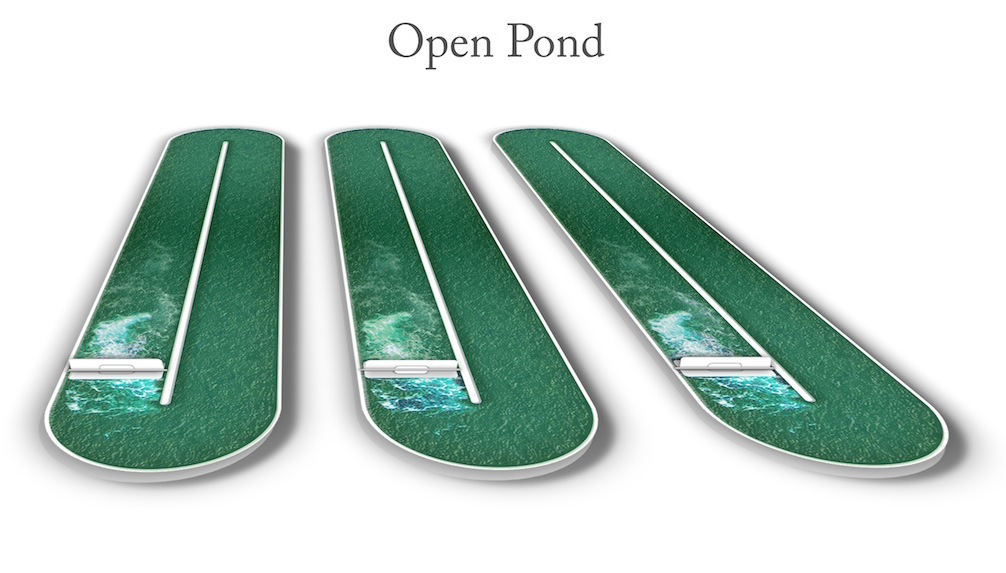
Design of a race-way open pond commonly used for algal culture

Algae grow much faster than food crops, and can produce hundreds of times more oil per unit area than conventional crops such as rapeseed, palms, soybeans, or jatropha. As algae have a harvesting cycle of 1–10 days, their cultivation permits several harvests in a very short time-frame, a strategy differing from that associated with annual crops. In addition, algae can be grown on land unsuitable for terrestrial crops, including arid land and land with excessively saline soil, minimizing competition with agriculture. Most research on algae cultivation has focused on growing algae in clean but expensive photobioreactors, or in open ponds, which are cheap to maintain but prone to contamination.

=== Closed-loop system ===
The lack of equipment and structures needed to begin growing algae in large quantities has inhibited widespread mass-production of algae for biofuel production. Maximum use of existing agriculture processes and hardware is the goal.

Closed systems (not exposed to open air) avoid the problem of contamination by other organisms blown in by the air. The problem of a closed system is finding a cheap source of sterile CO_{2}. Several experimenters have found the CO_{2} from a smokestack works well for growing algae. For reasons of economy, some experts think that algae farming for biofuels will have to be done as part of cogeneration, where it can make use of waste heat and help soak up pollution.

To produce micro-algae at large-scale under controlled environment using PBR system, strategies such as light guides, sparger, and PBR construction materials required should be well considered.

=== Photobioreactors ===
Most companies pursuing algae as a source of biofuels pump nutrient-rich water through plastic or borosilicate glass tubes (called "bioreactors" ) that are exposed to sunlight (and so-called photobioreactors or PBR).

Running a PBR is more difficult than using an open pond, and costlier, but may provide a higher level of control and productivity. In addition, a photobioreactor can be integrated into a closed loop cogeneration system much more easily than ponds or other methods.

=== Open pond ===
Open pond systems consist of simple in ground ponds, which are often mixed by a paddle wheel. These systems have low power requirements, operating costs, and capital costs when compared to closed loop photobioreactor systems. Nearly all commercial algae producers for high value algal products utilize open pond systems.

=== Turf scrubber ===
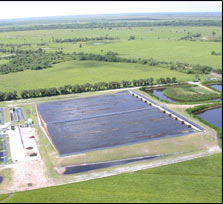
2.5 acre ATS system, installed by Hydromentia on a farm creek in Florida

The Algae scrubber is a system designed primarily for cleaning nutrients and pollutants out of water using algal turfs. An algal turf scrubber (ATS) mimics the algal turfs of a natural coral reef by taking in nutrient rich water from waste streams or natural water sources, and pulsing it over a sloped surface. This surface is coated with a rough plastic membrane or a screen, which allows naturally occurring algal spores to settle and colonize the surface. Once the algae has been established, it can be harvested every 5–15 days, and can produce 18 metric tons of algal biomass per hectare per year. In contrast to other methods, which focus primarily on a single high yielding species of algae, this method focuses on naturally occurring polycultures of algae. As such, the lipid content of the algae in an ATS system is usually lower, which makes it more suitable for a fermented fuel product, such as ethanol, methane, or butanol. Conversely, the harvested algae could be treated with a hydrothermal liquefaction process, which would make possible biodiesel, gasoline, and jet fuel production.

There are three major advantages of ATS over other systems. The first advantage is documented higher productivity over open pond systems. The second is lower operating and fuel production costs. The third is the elimination of contamination issues due to the reliance on naturally occurring algae species. The projected costs for energy production in an ATS system are $0.75/kg, compared to a photobioreactor which would cost $3.50/kg. Furthermore, due to the fact that the primary purpose of ATS is removing nutrients and pollutants out of water, and these costs have been shown to be lower than other methods of nutrient removal, this may incentivize the use of this technology for nutrient removal as the primary function, with biofuel production as an added benefit.

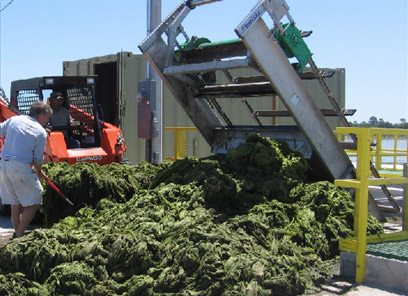
Algae being harvested and dried from an ATS system

== Fuel production ==
After harvesting the algae, the biomass is typically processed in a series of steps, which can differ based on the species and desired product; this is an active area of research and also is the bottleneck of this technology: the cost of extraction is higher than those obtained. One of the solutions is to use filter feeders to "eat" them. Improved animals can provide both foods and fuels. An alternative method to extract the algae is to grow the algae with specific types of fungi. This causes bio-flocculation of the algae which allows for easier extraction.

=== Dehydration ===
Often, the algae is dehydrated, and then a solvent such as hexane is used to extract energy-rich compounds like triglycerides from the dried material. Then, the extracted compounds can be processed into fuel using standard industrial procedures. For example, the extracted triglycerides are reacted with methanol to create biodiesel via transesterification. The unique composition of fatty acids of each species influences the quality of the resulting biodiesel and thus must be taken into account when selecting algal species for feedstock.

=== Hydrothermal liquefaction ===
An alternative approach called Hydrothermal liquefaction employs a continuous process that subjects harvested wet algae to high temperatures and pressures—350 °C (662 °F) and 3,000 pounds per square inch (21,000 kPa).

Products include crude oil, which can be further refined into aviation fuel, gasoline, or diesel fuel using one or many upgrading processes. The test process can convert about 79 percent of the algae's carbon into fuel.

== Nutrients ==
Nutrients like nitrogen (N), phosphorus (P), and potassium (K), are important for plant growth and are essential parts of fertilizer. Silica and iron, as well as several trace elements, may also be considered important marine nutrients as the lack of one can limit the growth of, or productivity in, an area.

=== Carbon dioxide ===
Bubbling CO_{2} through algal cultivation systems can greatly increase productivity and yield (up to a saturation point). Typically, about 1.8 tonnes of CO_{2} will be utilised per tonne of algal biomass (dry) produced, though this varies with algae species. The Glenturret Distillery in Perthshire percolate CO_{2} made during the whisky distillation through a microalgae bioreactor. Each tonne of microalgae absorbs two tonnes of CO_{2}. Scottish Bioenergy, who run the project, sell the microalgae as high value, protein-rich food for fisheries. In the future, they will use the algae residues to produce renewable energy through anaerobic digestion.

=== Nitrogen ===
Nitrogen is a valuable substrate that can be utilized in algal growth. Various sources of nitrogen can be used as a nutrient for algae, with varying capacities. Nitrate was found to be the preferred source of nitrogen, in regards to amount of biomass grown. Urea is a readily available source that shows comparable results, making it an economical substitute for nitrogen source in large scale culturing of algae. Despite the clear increase in growth in comparison to a nitrogen-less medium, it has been shown that alterations in nitrogen levels affect lipid content within the algal cells. In one study nitrogen deprivation for 72 hours caused the total fatty acid content (on a per cell basis) to increase by 2.4-fold. 65% of the total fatty acids were esterified to triacylglycerides in oil bodies, when compared to the initial culture, indicating that the algal cells utilized de novo synthesis of fatty acids. It is vital for the lipid content in algal cells to be of high enough quantity, while maintaining adequate cell division times, so parameters that can maximize both are under investigation.

=== Wastewater ===
A possible nutrient source is wastewater from the treatment of sewage, agricultural, or flood plain run-off, all currently major pollutants and health risks. However, this waste water cannot feed algae directly and must first be processed by bacteria, through anaerobic digestion. If waste water is not processed before it reaches the algae, it will contaminate the algae in the reactor, and at the very least, kill much of the desired algae strain. In biogas facilities, organic waste is often converted to a mixture of carbon dioxide, methane, and organic fertilizer. Organic fertilizer that comes out of the digester is liquid, and nearly suitable for algae growth, but it must first be cleaned and sterilized.

The utilization of wastewater and ocean water instead of freshwater is strongly advocated due to the continuing depletion of freshwater resources. However, heavy metals, trace metals, and other contaminants in wastewater can decrease the ability of cells to produce lipids biosynthetically and also impact various other workings in the machinery of cells. The same is true for ocean water, but the contaminants are found in different concentrations. Thus, agricultural-grade fertilizer is the preferred source of nutrients, but heavy metals are again a problem, especially for strains of algae that are susceptible to these metals. In open pond systems the use of strains of algae that can deal with high concentrations of heavy metals could prevent other organisms from infesting these systems. In some instances it has even been shown that strains of algae can remove over 90% of nickel and zinc from industrial wastewater in relatively short periods of time.

== Environmental impact ==
In comparison with terrestrial-based biofuel crops such as corn or soybeans, microalgal production results in a much less significant land footprint due to the higher oil productivity from the microalgae than all other oil crops. Algae can also be grown on marginal lands useless for ordinary crops and with low conservation value, and can use water from salt aquifers that is not useful for agriculture or drinking. Algae can also grow on the surface of the ocean in bags or floating screens. Thus microalgae could provide a source of clean energy with little impact on the provisioning of adequate food and water or the conservation of biodiversity. Algae cultivation also requires no external subsidies of insecticides or herbicides, removing any risk of generating associated pesticide waste streams. In addition, algal biofuels are much less toxic, and degrade far more readily than petroleum-based fuels. However, due to the flammable nature of any combustible fuel, there is potential for some environmental hazards if ignited or spilled, as may occur in a train derailment or a pipeline leak. This hazard is reduced compared to fossil fuels, due to the ability for algal biofuels to be produced in a much more localized manner, and due to the lower toxicity overall, but the hazard is still there nonetheless. Therefore, algal biofuels should be treated in a similar manner to petroleum fuels in transportation and use, with sufficient safety measures in place at all times.

Studies have determined that replacing fossil fuels with renewable energy sources, such as biofuels, have the capability of reducing CO_{2} emissions by up to 80%. An algae-based system could capture approximately 80% of the CO_{2} emitted from a power plant when sunlight is available. Although this CO_{2} will later be released into the atmosphere when the fuel is burned, this CO_{2} would have entered the atmosphere regardless. The possibility of reducing total CO_{2} emissions therefore lies in the prevention of the release of CO_{2} from fossil fuels. Furthermore, compared to fuels like diesel and petroleum, and even compared to other sources of biofuels, the production and combustion of algal biofuel does not produce any sulfur oxides or nitrous oxides, and produces a reduced amount of carbon monoxide, unburned hydrocarbons, and reduced emission of other harmful pollutants. Since terrestrial plant sources of biofuel production simply do not have the production capacity to meet current energy requirements, microalgae may be one of the only options to approach complete replacement of fossil fuels. However, current algae biofuels are often much less efficient than other biofuels.

Microalgae production also includes the ability to use saline waste or waste CO_{2} streams as an energy source. This opens a new strategy to produce biofuel in conjunction with waste water treatment, while being able to produce clean water as a byproduct. When used in a microalgal bioreactor, harvested microalgae will capture significant quantities of organic compounds as well as heavy metal contaminants absorbed from wastewater streams that would otherwise be directly discharged into surface and ground-water. Moreover, this process also allows the recovery of phosphorus from waste, which is an essential but scarce element in nature – the reserves of which are estimated to have depleted in the last 50 years. Another possibility is the use of algae production systems to clean up non-point source pollution, in a system known as an algal turf scrubber (ATS). This has been demonstrated to reduce nitrogen and phosphorus levels in rivers and other large bodies of water affected by eutrophication, and systems are being built that will be capable of processing up to 110 million liters of water per day. ATS can also be used for treating point source pollution, such as the waste water mentioned above, or in treating livestock effluent.

=== Polycultures ===
Nearly all research in algal biofuels has focused on culturing single species, or monocultures, of microalgae. However, ecological theory and empirical studies have demonstrated that plant and algae polycultures, i.e. groups of multiple species, tend to produce larger yields than monocultures. Experiments have also shown that more diverse aquatic microbial communities tend to be more stable through time than less diverse communities. Recent studies found that polycultures of microalgae produced significantly higher lipid yields than monocultures. Polycultures also tend to be more resistant to pest and disease outbreaks, as well as invasion by other plants or algae. Thus culturing microalgae in polyculture may not only increase yields and stability of yields of biofuel, but also reduce the environmental impact of an algal biofuel industry.

== Economic viability ==
There is clearly a demand for sustainable biofuel production, but whether a particular biofuel will be used ultimately depends not on sustainability but cost efficiency. Therefore, research is focusing on cutting the cost of algal biofuel production to the point where it can compete with conventional petroleum. The production of several products from algae has been mentioned as the most important factor for making algae production economically viable. Other factors are the improving of the solar energy to biomass conversion efficiency (currently 3%, but 5 to 7% is theoretically attainable) and making the oil extraction from the algae easier.

In a 2007 report a formula was derived estimating the cost of algal oil in order for it to be a viable substitute to petroleum diesel:

C_{(algal oil)} = 25.9 × 10^{−3} C_{(petroleum)}

where: C_{(algal oil)} is the price of microalgal oil in dollars per gallon and C_{(petroleum)} is the price of crude oil in dollars per barrel. This equation assumes that algal oil has roughly 80% of the caloric energy value of crude petroleum.

The IEA estimated in 2017 that algal biomass can be produced for a little as $0.54/kg in open pond in a warm climate to $10.20/kg in photobioreactors in cooler climates. Assuming that the biomass contains 30% oil by weight, the cost of biomass for providing a liter of oil would be approximately $1.40 ($5.30/gal) and $1.81 ($6.85/gal) for photobioreactors and raceways, respectively. Oil recovered from the lower cost biomass produced in photobioreactors is estimated to cost $2.80/L, assuming the recovery process contributes 50% to the cost of the final recovered oil. If existing algae projects can achieve biodiesel production price targets of less than $1 per gallon, the United States may realize its goal of replacing up to 20% of transport fuels by 2020 by using environmentally and economically sustainable fuels from algae production.

Whereas technical problems, such as harvesting, are being addressed successfully by the industry, the high up-front investment of algae-to-biofuels facilities is seen by many as a major obstacle to the success of this technology. As of 2007, only few studies on the economic viability were publicly available, and must often rely on the little data (often only engineering estimates) available in the public domain. Dmitrov examined the GreenFuel's photobioreactor and estimated that algae oil would only be competitive at an oil price of $800 per barrel. A study by Alabi et al. examined raceways, photobioreactors and anaerobic fermenters to make biofuels from algae and found that photobioreactors are too expensive to make biofuels. Raceways might be cost-effective in warm climates with very low labor costs, and fermenters may become cost-effective subsequent to significant process improvements. The group found that capital cost, labor cost and operational costs (fertilizer, electricity, etc.) by themselves are too high for algae biofuels to be cost-competitive with conventional fuels. Similar results were found by others, suggesting that unless new, cheaper ways of harnessing algae for biofuels production are found, their great technical potential may never become economically accessible. In 2012, Rodrigo E. Teixeira demonstrated a new reaction and proposed a process for harvesting and extracting raw materials for biofuel and chemical production that requires a fraction of the energy of current methods, while extracting all cell constituents.

A 2022 study stated that selling fuel from commercially refining biofuel was not feasible due to technological limitations and high costs. The study found that byproducts would require a selling price of $899/ton of residual solids in order to support a competitive price of $2.50 per gallon gasoline equivalent, using the method of converting proteins and carbohydrates into mixed alcohols. Comparatively, the study found converting proteins and carbohydrates into hydrocarbons to require a higher selling price $1033/ton of residual solids in order to be economically feasible.

== Use of byproducts ==
Many of the byproducts produced in the processing of microalgae can be used in various applications, many of which have a longer history of production than algal biofuel. Some of the products not used in the production of biofuel include natural dyes and pigments, antioxidants, and other high-value bio-active compounds. These chemicals and excess biomass have found numerous use in other industries. For example, the dyes and oils have found a place in cosmetics, commonly as thickening and water-binding agents. Discoveries within the pharmaceutical industry include antibiotics and antifungals derived from microalgae, as well as natural health products, which have been growing in popularity over the past few decades. For instance Spirulina contains numerous polyunsaturated fats (Omega 3 and 6), amino acids, and vitamins, as well as pigments that may be beneficial, such as beta-carotene and chlorophyll.

== Advantages ==
=== Ease of growth ===
One of the main advantages that using microalgae as the feedstock when compared to more traditional crops is that it can be grown much more easily. Algae can be grown in land that would not be considered suitable for the growth of the regularly used crops. In addition to this, wastewater that would normally hinder plant growth has been shown to be very effective in growing algae. Because of this, algae can be grown without taking up arable land that would otherwise be used for producing food crops, and the better resources can be reserved for normal crop production. Microalgae also require fewer resources to grow and little attention is needed, allowing the growth and cultivation of algae to be a very passive process.

=== Impact on food ===
Many traditional feedstocks for biodiesel, such as corn and palm, are also used as feed for livestock on farms, as well as a valuable source of food for humans. Because of this, using them as biofuel reduces the amount of food available for both, resulting in an increased cost for both the food and the fuel produced. Using algae as a source of biodiesel can alleviate this problem in a number of ways. First, algae is not used as a primary food source for humans, meaning that it can be used solely for fuel and there would be little impact in the food industry. Second, many of the waste-product extracts produced during the processing of algae for biofuel can be used as a sufficient animal feed. This is an effective way to minimize waste and a much cheaper alternative to the more traditional corn- or grain-based feeds.

=== Minimalisation of waste ===
Growing algae as a source of biofuel has also been shown to have numerous environmental benefits, and has presented itself as a much more environmentally friendly alternative to current biofuels. For one, it is able to utilize run-off, water contaminated with fertilizers and other nutrients that are a by-product of farming, as its primary source of water and nutrients. Because of this, it prevents this contaminated water from mixing with the lakes and rivers that currently supply our drinking water. In addition to this, the ammonia, nitrates, and phosphates that would normally render the water unsafe actually serve as excellent nutrients for the algae, meaning that fewer resources are needed to grow the algae. Many algae species used in biodiesel production are excellent bio-fixers, meaning they are able to remove carbon dioxide from the atmosphere to use as a form of energy for themselves. Because of this, they have found use in industry as a way to treat flue gases and reduce GHG emissions.

== Disadvantage ==
=== High water requirement ===
The process of microalgae cultivation is highly water-intensive. Life cycle studies estimated that the production of 1 liter of microalgae based biodiesel requires between 607 and 1944 liters of water. That said, abundant wastewater and/or seawater, which also contain various nutrients, can theoretically be used for this purpose instead of freshwater.

=== Commercial viability ===
Algae biodiesel is still a fairly new technology. Despite the fact that research began over 30 years ago, it was put on hold during the mid-1990s, mainly due to a lack of funding and a relatively low petroleum cost. For the next few years algae biofuels saw little attention; it was not until the gas peak of the early 2000s that it eventually had a revitalization in the search for alternative fuel sources.

Increasing interest in seaweed farming for carbon sequestration, eutrophication reduction and production of food has resulted in the creation of commercial seaweed cultivation since 2017. Reductions in the cost of cultivation and harvesting as well as the development of commercial industry will improve the economics of macroalgae biofuels. Climate change has created a proliferation of brown macroalgae mats, which wash up on the shores of the Caribbean. Currently these mats are disposed of but there is interest in developing them into a feedstock for biofuel production.

=== Stability ===
The biodiesel produced from the processing of microalgae differs from other forms of biodiesel in the content of polyunsaturated fats. Polyunsaturated fats are known for their ability to retain fluidity at lower temperatures. While this may seem like an advantage in production during the colder temperatures of the winter, the polyunsaturated fats result in lower stability during regular seasonal temperatures.

== International policies ==
=== Canada ===
Numerous policies have been put in place since the 1975 oil crisis in order to promote the use of Renewable Fuels in the United States, Canada and Europe. In Canada, these included the implementation of excise taxes exempting propane and natural gas which was extended to ethanol made from biomass and methanol in 1992. The federal government also announced their renewable fuels strategy in 2006 which proposed four components: increasing availability of renewable fuels through regulation, supporting the expansion of Canadian production of renewable fuels, assisting farmers to seize new opportunities in this sector and accelerating the commercialization of new technologies. These mandates were quickly followed by the Canadian provinces:

=== United States ===
Policies in the United States have included a decrease in the subsidies provided by the federal and state governments to the oil industry which have usually included $2.84 billion. This is more than what is actually set aside for the biofuel industry. The measure was discussed at the G20 in Pittsburgh where leaders agreed that "inefficient fossil fuel subsidies encourage wasteful consumption, reduce our energy security, impede investment in clean sources and undermine efforts to deal with the threat of climate change". If this commitment is followed through and subsidies are removed, a fairer market in which algae biofuels can compete will be created. In 2010, the U.S. House of Representatives passed a legislation seeking to give algae-based biofuels parity with cellulose biofuels in federal tax credit programs. The algae-based renewable fuel promotion act (HR 4168) was implemented to give biofuel projects access to a $1.01 per gal production tax credit and 50% bonus depreciation for biofuel plant property. The U.S. Government also introduced the domestic Fuel for Enhancing National Security Act implemented in 2011. This policy constitutes an amendment to the Federal property and administrative services act of 1949 and federal defense provisions in order to extend to 15 the number of years that the Department of Defense (DOD) multiyear contract may be entered into the case of the purchase of advanced biofuel. Federal and DOD programs are usually limited to a 5-year period

=== Other ===
The European Union (EU) has also responded by quadrupling the credits for second-generation algae biofuels which was established as an amendment to the Biofuels and Fuel Quality Directives.

== See also ==
- Acetone–butanol–ethanol fermentation – Chemical process
- Biochemical engineering – Manufacturing by chemical reactions of biological organisms
- Biological hydrogen production (algae) – Hydrogen that is produced biologically
- Carbon neutrality – Rate of human-caused greenhouse gas emissions
- Culture Biosystems – Renewable energy company
- Cyanotoxin – Toxin produced by cyanobacteria
- Direct air capture – Method of carbon capture from carbon dioxide in air
- International Renewable Energy Alliance
- Joule Unlimited
- List of algal fuel producers
- Ocean thermal energy conversion – Extracting energy from the ocean
- Phycology – Branch of biology concerned with the study of algae
- Phytoplankton – Autotrophic members of the plankton ecosystem
- Residual sodium carbonate index
- Scottish Association for Marine Science – Scottish oceanographic society and research organization
- Sea6 Energy
- Thermal depolymerization – Process for breaking-down polymers
