= E-diesel =

Synthetic diesel fuel

E-diesel is a synthetic diesel fuel for use in automobiles. Currently, e-diesel is created at two sites: by an Audi research facility Germany in partnership with a company named Sunfire, and in Texas. The fuel is created from carbon dioxide, water, and electricity with a process powered by renewable energy sources to create a liquid energy carrier called blue crude (in contrast to regular crude oil) which is then refined to generate e-diesel. E-diesel is considered to be a carbon-neutral fuel as it does not extract new carbon and the energy sources to drive the process are from carbon-neutral sources.

== Catalytic conversions ==
Water	CO_{2}
Electrolysis of Water
Oxygen	Hydrogen
Conversion Reactor
Water	Hydrogen	CO
F-T Reactor

Sunfire power-to-liquids system

Sunfire, a clean technology company, operates a pilot plant in Dresden, Germany. The current process involves high-temperature electrolysis powered by electricity generated from renewable energy sources to split water into hydrogen and oxygen. The next two chemical processes to create a liquid energy carrier called blue crude are done at a temperature of 220 °C (428 °F) and a pressure of 25 bars (2,500 kPa). In a conversion step, hydrogen and carbon dioxide are used to create syngas with water as byproduct. The syngas, which contains carbon monoxide and hydrogen, reacts to generate the blue crude.

- Sunfire power-to-liquids system: Base products are carbon dioxide (CO_{2}) and water (H_{2}O)

1st step: Electrolysis of Water (SOEC) −water is split into hydrogen and oxygen.
2nd step: Conversion Reactor (RWGSR) −hydrogen and carbon dioxide are inputs to the Conversion Reactor that outputs hydrogen, carbon monoxide, and water.
3rd step: F-T Reactor −hydrogen and carbon monoxide are inputs to the F-T Reactor that outputs paraffinic and olefinic hydrocarbons, ranging from methane to high molecular weight waxes.

The third step is also known as Fischer–Tropsch process which was first developed in 1925 by German chemists Franz Fischer and Hans Tropsch. After the blue crude is produced, it can be refined to create e-diesel on site, saving the fuel and other infrastructure costs on crude transportation. As of April 2015, Sunfire has a capability to produce a limited amount of fuel at 160 litres (35 imp gal; 42 US gal) a day. There is a plan to increase the production to an industrial scale.

Audi also partners with a company named Climeworks which manufactures Direct Air Capture technology. Climeworks technologies can absorb atmospheric carbon dioxide which is chemically captured at the surface of a sorbent until it becomes saturated. At that point, the sorbent is introduced with 95 °C (203 °F) heat in a desorption cycle to drive out the high-purity carbon dioxide that can be used during the conversion step of the blue crude generation process. The atmospheric carbon dioxide capturing process has 90% of energy demand in the form of low-temperature heat and the rest from electrical energy for pumping and control. The combined plant of Climeworks and Sunfire in Dresden became operational in November 2014. As of April 2015, an Audi A8 driven by Federal Minister of Education and Research in Germany is using the e-diesel fuel.

A plant on Herøya in Norway, producing 10 million liters per year, is being considered, as CO_{2} from a fertilizer plant is readily available and electricity is relatively cheap in Norway.

An E-diesel plant in Texas started in 2024.

=== Properties ===
As much as eighty percent of blue crude can be converted into e-diesel. The fuel contains no sulfur or aromatics, and has a high cetane number. These properties allow it to be blended with typical fossil diesel and used as a replacement fuel in automobiles with diesel engines.

=== Oxygen by-product ===
In future designs, the oxygen by-product may be combined with renewable natural gas in the oxidative coupling of methane to ethylene:

2CH_{4} + O_{2} → C_{2}H_{4} + 2H_{2}O

The reaction is exothermic (∆H = -280 kJ/mol) and occurs at high temperatures (750–950 ˚C). The yield of the desired C_{2} products is reduced by non-selective reactions of methyl radicals with the reactor surface and oxygen, which produces carbon monoxide and carbon dioxide by-products. Another ethylene production initiative developed by the European Commission through the Seventh Framework Programme for Research and Technological Development is the OCMOL process, which is the Oxidative Coupling of Methane (OCM) and simultaneous Reforming of Methane (RM) in a fully integrated reactor.

== Biocatalytic conversions ==
Helioculture combines brackish water (or graywater), nutrients, photosynthetic organisms, carbon dioxide, and sunlight to create fuel.

Audi also partnered with a now-defunct United States company, Joule, to develop Sunflow-D as e-diesel for Audi. Joule's planned plant in New Mexico involved the use of genetically modified microorganisms in bright sunlight to act as catalyst for the conversion of carbon dioxide and salty water into hydrocarbons. The process could be modified for longer molecular chains to produce alkanes in order to create synthetic diesel.

Joule was the first company to patent a modified organism that continuously secretes hydrocarbon fuel. The organism is a single-celled cyanobacterium, also known as blue-green algae, although it is technically not an algae. It produces the fuel using photosynthesis, the same process that multi-cellular green plants use, to make sugars and other materials from water, carbon dioxide, and sunlight.

== Similar initiatives ==
There are other initiatives to create synthetic fuel from carbon dioxide and water, some are called e-diesel. The water splitting methods vary.

- Concentrated solar power
  - 2004 Sunshine-to-Petrol – Sandia National Laboratories.
  - 2013 NewCO2Fuels – New CO_{2} Fuels Ltd (IL) and Weizmann Institute of Science.
  - 2014 Solar-Jet Fuels – Consortium partners ETH Zurich, Royal Dutch Shell, DLR, Bauhaus Luftfahrt, ARTTIC.
- High-temperature electrolysis
  - 2004 Syntrolysis Fuels – Idaho National Laboratory and Ceramatec, Inc. (US).
  - 2008 WindFuels – Doty Energy (US).
  - 2012 Air Fuel Synthesis – Air Fuel Synthesis Ltd (UK).
  - 2013 Green Feed – Ben-Gurion University of the Negev and Israel Strategic Alternative Energy Foundation (I-SAEF).
  - 2014 Audi E-diesel

The U.S. Naval Research Laboratory (NRL) is designing a power-to-liquids system using the Fischer-Tropsch Process to create fuel on board a ship at sea, with the base products carbon dioxide (CO_{2}) and water (H_{2}O) being derived from sea water via "An Electrochemical Module Configuration For The Continuous Acidification Of Alkaline Water Sources And Recovery Of CO_{2} With Continuous Hydrogen Gas Production".

== Climate Solution ==
While some argue that carbon neutral e-fuels such as e-diesel are a promising solution to climate change, others have pointed to their high cost and neglect of demand-side solutions which could lock-in fossil fuel infrastructure. Also, e-fuels used in an internal combustion engine would need "about five times more renewable electricity than running a battery-electric vehicle". As a result, some have called for e-fuels to be used only for vehicles that are harder to electrify, such as airplanes and cargo ships, rather than cars.

== See also ==
- E-gasoline: another fuel Audi is working on
- Power to gas
- Gas to liquids
- Energy storage
- Alternative fuel
- Renewable fuel
- Alternative energy
- Renewable energy
- Earth's energy budget
- Renewable energy debate
- Synthetic fuel commercialization
