= Sapphire Energy =

Sapphire Energy, Inc.
- Type: Private
- Industry: Energy
- Founded: San Diego, California, May 2007
- Founder: Steve Briggs; Kristina Burow; Nathaniel David; Stephen Mayfield; Michael Mendez; Bryan O'Neill; Yan Poon; Jason Pyle
- Headquarters: San Diego, California, U.S.
- Key people: Cynthia "CJ" Warner, Chairman & CEO; Jeff D. Webster, COO; Thomas "Tom" Willardson, CFO; Matthew Croughan, CTO; Tim Zenk, VP of Corporate Affairs; Jaime E. Moreno, P.E., VP of Projects; Dean Venardos, VP of Operations; Jim Butler, VP of Legal Affairs and Intellectual Property; Dan Sajkowski, Sr. Director of Downstream Technology
- Products: Biofuel; Green Crude
- Number of employees: 150+
- Website: sapphireenergy.com

Sapphire Energy was a San Diego–based American energy company that aimed to produce crude oil with algae.

== History ==
Sapphire Energy was founded in 2007.

The company was headquartered in San Diego, Calif., and had an engineering office in Orange County, Calif. and a Research and Development facility in Las Cruces, New Mexico. The company built a Green Crude Farm, the world's first commercial demonstration algae-to-energy facility (also known as the Integrated Algal BioRefinery or IABR), for which construction began in June 2011, operated in Luna County, near Columbus, New Mexico. Sapphire's Green Crude Farm integrates the entire value chain of algae-based fuel, from cultivation, to harvest, to conversion of ready-to-refine Green Crude, representing the convergence of biotechnology, agriculture, and energy.

In March 2011, Sapphire Energy and Monsanto announced a multi-year collaboration on algae-based research projects. In May 2011, the company announced a multi-year agreement with The Linde Group to co-develop a low-cost system to deliver CO_{2} to commercial-scale, open-pond, algae-to-fuel cultivation systems, now underway at the Green Crude Farm. Later, in July 2013, the companies expanded their partnership with plans to refine and commercialize a new industrial scale hydrothermal treatment technology to upgrade algae biomass to crude oil that they intend to license and market to various industries, including algae, municipal solid waste, and farm waste, for converting other biomass sources into energy. In February 2012, Sapphire Energy announced that it will integrate Earthrise Nutritionals' spirulina strain into its growing inventory of cyanobacteria and algae strains to expand resources for algae-to-energy production. In November 2012, the company announced a partnership with the Institute for Systems Biology to further the scientific research and development of algae biofuels.

In 2013, Sapphire Energy expanded its partner network to include business agreements with industry leading oil & gas refiners. In March 2013, Sapphire Energy announced a commercial agreement with Tesoro Refining and Marketing Company, LLC. Per the agreement, Tesoro will purchase crude oil from Sapphire Energy's Green Crude Farm for processing into fuel at its west coast refineries. In December 2013, Sapphire Energy and Phillips 66 announced they will work together to analyze and confirm that Green Crude can be refined in traditional refineries, and that it meets all Environmental Protection Agency's (EPA) certification requirements under the Clean Air Act.

Seed financing to launch the company in 2007 was provided by ARCH Ventures and Larry Bock. In 2008, Sapphire Energy announced it had raised more than $100 million in a Series B funding round which included ARCH Venture Partners, Wellcome Trust, Venrock and Cascade Investment, LLC. In April 2012, the company announced it had secured $144 million in Series C investment funding with backers including Arrowpoint Partners, Monsanto and other undisclosed investors, as well as all Series B investors.

In December 2009, Sapphire Energy was awarded a $54.5 million USDA loan guarantee and a $50 million grant from the US Dept. of Energy as part of President Obama's American Recovery and Reinvestment Act and the USDA's Biorefinery Assistance Program 9003, authorized through the 2008 Farm Bill. The $54.5 million loan guarantee awarded through the Biorefinery Assistance Program was issued to build a fully integrated, algae-to-crude oil commercial demonstration facility in Columbus, New Mexico. In partnership with the USDA and the U.S. Department of Energy, Sapphire Energy developed and implemented its facility, known as the Green Crude Farm, on time and on budget.

Sapphire Energy's Green Crude biofuel was featured in multiple pilot demonstrations since 2009. The company used Syntroleum Inc (SYNM) technology to provide fifty gallons of gasoline for the Algaeus, a plugin-hybrid Toyota Prius that drove across the United States in September 2009. The tour was conducted to show that gasoline made by algae is viable in today's vehicles, without modification. In 2009, Continental Airlines also tested one of Sapphire Energy's green crude blends.[7] Sapphire Energy provided Green Crude oil for the first flight's using algae derived jet fuel that was refined by UOP into jet fuel for two test flights – Continental Airlines 737-800 and Japan Airlines 747-300. In 2012, the company provided its Green Crude diesel fuel to power Below the Surface's 'Driving Innovation' Racing Team, which established itself by setting the first official algae-fueled diesel motorcycle speed records through a series of race challenges in the United States and Mexico.

Sapphire Energy sold off the Integrated Algal BioRefinery in Luna County in 2019 to Green Stream Farms who use it to grow algae for use in nutritional products and livestock feed. As of August 2021 it was still in operation and being expanded, although the refinery operations seem to have been discontinued.

== Products ==
Sapphire Energy produced "Green Crude" from algae, creating a crude oil containing many of the properties found in fossil crude oil. Green Crude is a low carbon crude oil offering a reduction in carbon emissions compared to petroleum-based equivalents. Its production doesn't impact agricultural crops, land, or water, since algae are grown in salty, non-potable water, using lands not suitable for agriculture, and require only sunlight and CO_{2} to grow. It also drops right into the current infrastructure of today's cars, trucks, and aircraft without modifications. According to the company, "Green Crude" oil meets fuel quality standards, and is completely compatible with the existing petroleum infrastructure, from refinement through distribution to retail suppliers. Gasoline produced from the Green Crude achieved a 91 octane rating while meeting fuel quality standards.

In August 2012, Sapphire Energy announced that its commercial demonstration algae-to-energy facility, the Green Crude Farm, was up and running with the on-time and on budget completion of Phase 1 construction, which began June 2011. The Farm consisted of 100 acres of 1.1 acre and 2.2 acre ponds, as well as all the mechanical and processing equipment needed to harvest and extract algae and recycle water for the planned 300 acre facility.

The company expected the Green Crude Farm to produce 100 barrels a day of ready-to-refine crude oil at full operating capacity. In the September 2012 issue of Forbes magazine, Sapphire Energy expected its Green Crude to "be competitive with petroleum by 2018 if it can produce a minimum of 5,000 barrels a day".
