= Bio Fuel Systems =

Spanish corporation

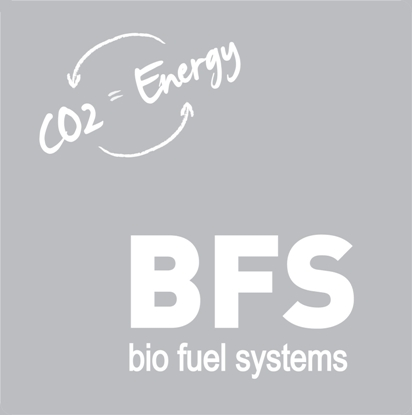

BFS Blue Enterprises is a Spanish-owned firm whose multi-patented, microalgae-based technology uses CO_{2} emissions to produce crude oil together with biotech & pharmaceutical products. It was formed in 2006 in eastern Spain after three years of research by scientists and engineers connected with the University of Alicante. Currently, an industrial pilot plant is known to have proven to produce standardized products, while utilizing and neutralizing CO_{2} emissions. Their system of bioconversion is said to be more productive than any other plant-based system producing oil or ethanol.

== Founders ==
One of the founders is to be Bernard StroÏazzo Mougin.

== See also ==
- Algal fuel
- Biofuel
- Biopetroleum
- Bioplastic

== Sources ==
- "Spanish Firm Claims it Can Make Oil from Plankton". Reuters. 21 July 2006. Archived from the original on 8 December 2006.
