= Joule Unlimited =

Helioculture combines brackish water (or graywater), nutrients, photosynthetic organisms, carbon dioxide, and sunlight to create fuel.

Joule Unlimited, formerly known as Joule Biotechnologies, was a producer of alternative energy technologies based in Bedford, Massachusetts. The company developed a process to generate hydrocarbon-based fuel by combining non-fresh water, nutrients, cyanobacteria, carbon dioxide, and sunlight. After ten years of operation and building a demonstration plant in New Mexico, the company shut down in August 2017. The company shut down after management was unable to raise money.

== Technology claims ==
The company claimed it would be able to produce more than 20,000 gallons of fuel per acre per year (19,000 m^{3}/km^{2}/annum) in almost refined form using carbon dioxide waste from industrial processes and desert land.

Helioculture uses photosynthetic organisms, but is otherwise distinct from the process that makes fuel from algae. Oils made from algae usually have to be refined into fuel following a batch process, but helioculture secretes fuel directly rather than storing it in their cells - either ethanol or hydrocarbons - that do not need refining. The helioculture process also does not produce biomass. This process is enabled by the discovery of unique genes coding for enzymatic mechanisms that enable the direct synthesis of such key molecules as alkanes, olefins, ethanol and polymers and other high-value chemicals ordinarily derived from petroleum, using bacterial variants. Helioculture allows for brackish water or graywater, nonindustrial waste water from sources such as baths and washing machines, to be used, while traditional biofuels such as cellulosic ethanol require fresh water.

Joule Unlimited claimed that its product would have been cost competitive with crude oil at $50 a barrel ($310/m^{3}). The company also stated that its product could supply all of the transportation fuel for the United States from an area the size of the Texas panhandle.

Joule Unlimited did not reveal the name of the organism that it used, although it acknowledged that the company had modified the organism. In September, 2010, Joule received a patent for a genetically altered bacterium.

== People ==
Joule Unlimited was founded in 2007 within Flagship VentureLabs by Noubar Afeyan and David Berry. In addition to its founders, Joule's Board of Directors included Graham Allison, Anatoly Chubais, Stelios Papadopoulos, Caroline Dorsa, and Ruben Vardanian. Joule's Scientific Advisory Board includes synthetic biologists George M. Church and Jim Collins.

== Audi partnership ==
After building a demonstration plant in New Mexico, Joule Unlimited entered into a strategic partnership with Audi in 2012 to accelerate the commercialization of their fuels, ethanol named Sunflow-E and diesel named Sunflow-D. Audi brands them as e-ethanol and e-diesel respectively.
