= Neochloris oleoabundans =

Scientific classification
- Kingdom: Plantae
- Division: Chlorophyta
- Class: Chlorophyceae
- Order: Sphaeropleales
- Family: Neochloridaceae
- Genus: Neochloris
- Species: N. oleoabundans

Binomial name
- Neochloris oleoabundans S. Chantanachat & H. C. Bold

Species of alga

Neochloris oleoabundans is a microalga belonging in the class Chlorophyceae. Due to its high lipid content, it has been considered as a candidate organism for cosmetics and biofuel production, as well as feed stock for freshwater mussels.

Neochloris oleoabundans was first isolated from a sand dune in Saudi Arabia by S. Chantanachat sometime between 1958 and 1962.

Neochloris oleoabundans consists of spherical cells borne singly or in irregular groups. The cell wall is thin and smooth, but may have a bump on one side. Cells are 6–22(–25) μm in diameter; each cell has is a single chloroplast which is cup-shaped to nearly spherical, with many narrow incisions; chloroplasts have one or more ellipsoidal pyrenoids covered with two or three shells of starch. It reproduces asexually via biflagellate zoospores or aplanospores.

== See also ==
- Algaculture
