= Alternative fuel =

Fuels from sources other than fossil fuels

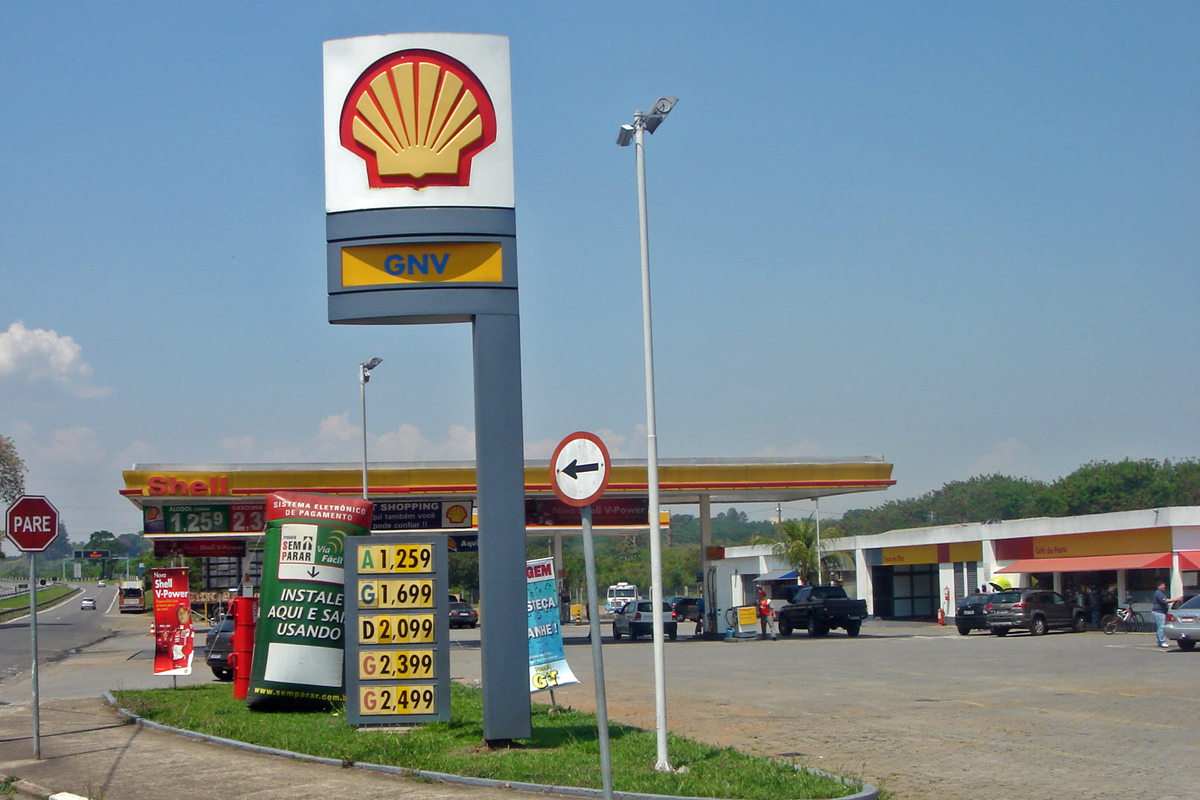
Typical Brazilian filling station with four alternative fuels for sale: biodiesel (B3), gasohol (E25), neat ethanol (E100), and compressed natural gas (CNG). Piracicaba, São Paulo, Brazil.

Alternative fuels, also known as non-conventional and advanced fuels, are fuels derived from sources other than petroleum. Alternative fuels include gaseous fossil fuels like propane, natural gas, methane, and ammonia; biofuels like biodiesel, bioalcohol, and refuse-derived fuel; and other renewable fuels like hydrogen and electricity.

These fuels are intended to substitute for more carbon intensive energy sources like gasoline and diesel in transportation and can help to contribute to decarbonization and reductions in pollution. Alternative fuel is also shown to reduce non-carbon emissions such as the release of nitric oxide and nitrogen dioxide, as well as sulfur dioxide and other harmful gases in the exhaust. This is especially important in industries such as mining, where toxic gases can accumulate more easily.

== Official definitions ==
=== Definition in the European Union ===
In the European Union, alternative fuel is defined by Directive 2014/94/EU of the European Parliament and of the Council of 22 October 2014 on the deployment of alternative fuels infrastructure.

'alternative fuels' means fuels or power sources which serve, at least partly, as a substitute for fossil oil sources in the energy supply to transport and which have the potential to contribute to its decarbonisation and enhance the environmental performance of the transport sector. They include, inter alia:

- electricity,
- hydrogen,
- biofuels as defined in point (i) of Article 2 of Directive 2009/28/EC,
- synthetic and paraffinic fuels,
- natural gas, including biomethane, in gaseous form (compressed natural gas (CNG)) and liquefied form (liquefied natural gas (LNG)), and
- liquefied petroleum gas (LPG);

— Directive 2014/94/EU of the European Parliament and of the Council of 22 October 2014 on the deployment of alternative fuels infrastructure.

=== Definition in the US ===
In the US, the EPA defines alternative fuel as

Alternative fuel including gaseous fuels such as hydrogen, natural gas, and propane; alcohols such as ethanol, methanol, and butanol; vegetable and waste-derived oils; and electricity. These fuels may be used in a dedicated system that burns a single fuel, or in a mixed system with other fuels including traditional gasoline or diesel, such as in hybrid-electric or flexible fuel vehicles.

— EPA

=== Definition in Canada ===
In Canada, since 1996, Alternative Fuels Regulations SOR/96-453 Alternative Fuels Act defined alternative fuel:

For the purposes of the definition alternative fuel in subsection 2(1) of the Act, the following, when used as the sole source of direct propulsion energy of a motor vehicle, are prescribed to be alternative fuels:

(a) ethanol;
(b) methanol;
(c) propane gas;
(d) natural gas;
(e) hydrogen;
(f) electricity;
(g) for the purposes of subsections 4(1) and 5(1) of the Act, any blended fuel that contains at least 50 per cent of one of the fuels referred to in paragraphs (a) to (e); and
(h) for the purposes of subsections 4(2) and 5(2) of the Act, any blended fuel that contains one of the fuels mentioned in paragraphs (a) to (e).

— Alternative Fuels Regulations (SOR/96-453)

=== China ===
In China, alternative fuel vehicles should comply with technical guidelines for the local production of alternative-fuel vehicles: they should have a shelf life of more than 100,000 kilometres (62,000 mi), and a complete charge should take less than seven hours. Up to 80% of a charge must be available after less than 30 minutes of charging. In addition, pure-electric vehicles must consume electric energy of less than 0.16 kWh/km.

== Biofuel ==
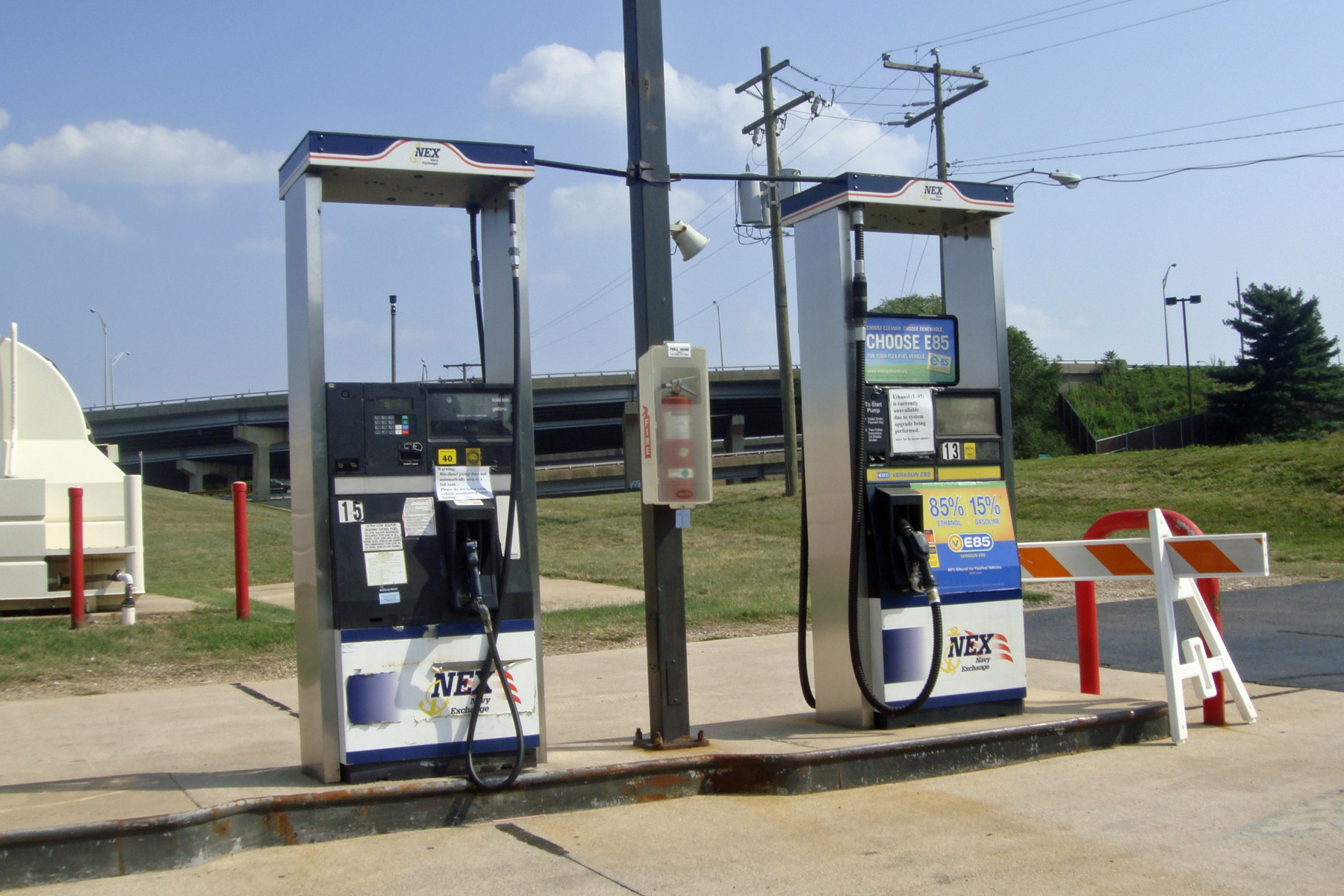
Alternative fuel dispensers at a regular gasoline station in Arlington, Virginia. B20 biodiesel at the left and E85 ethanol at the right.

Biofuels are also considered a renewable source. Although renewable energy is used mostly to generate electricity, it is often assumed that some form of renewable energy or a percentage is used to create alternative fuels. Research is ongoing into finding more suitable biofuel crops and improving the oil yields of these crops. Using the current yields, vast amounts of arable land and fresh water would be needed to produce enough oil to completely replace fossil fuel usage.

=== Biomass ===
Biomass in the energy production industry is living and recently dead biological material which can be used as fuel or for industrial production. It has become popular among coal power stations, which switch from coal to biomass in order to convert to renewable energy generation without wasting existing generating plant and infrastructure. Biomass most often refers to plants or plant-based materials that are not used for food or feed, and are specifically called nitrocellulose biomass. As an energy source, biomass can either be used directly via combustion to produce heat, or indirectly after converting it to various forms of biofuel.

=== Algae fuel ===
Algae-based biofuels have been promoted in the media as a potential panacea to crude oil-based transportation problems. Algae could yield more than 2000 gallons of fuel per acre per year of production. Algae based fuels are being successfully tested by the U.S. Navy Algae-based plastics show potential to reduce waste and the cost per pound of algae plastic is expected to be cheaper than traditional plastic prices.

=== Biodiesel ===
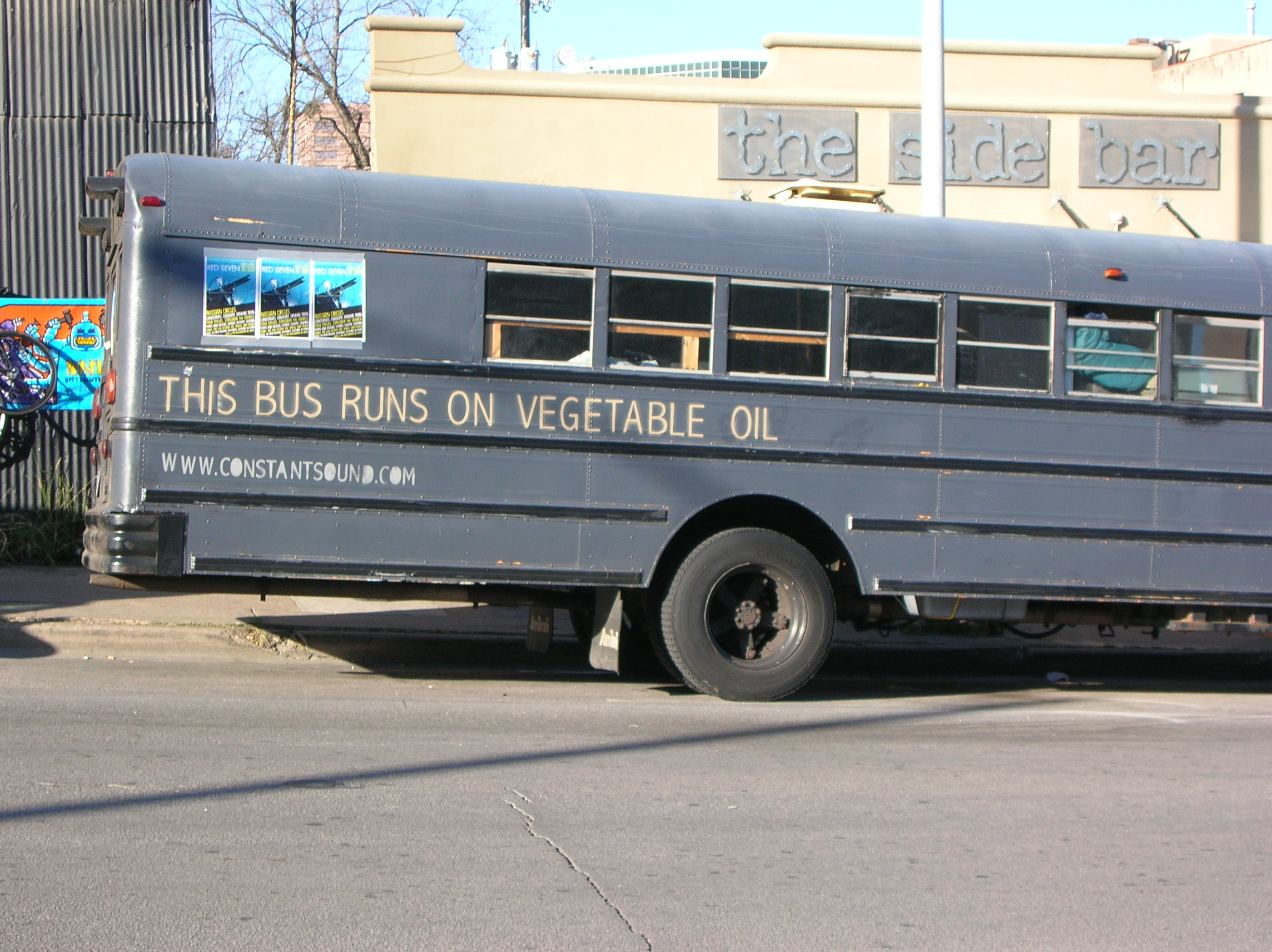
Vegetable oil fuelled bus at South by South West festival, Austin, Texas (March 2008).

Biodiesel is made from animal fats or vegetable oils, renewable resources that come from plants such as atrophy, soybean, sunflowers, corn, olive, peanut, palm, coconut, safflower, canola, sesame, cottonseed, etc. Once these fats or oils are filtered from their hydrocarbons and then combined with alcohol like methanol, diesel is produced from this chemical reaction. These raw materials can either be mixed with pure diesel to make various proportions or used alone. Despite one's mixture preference, biodiesel will release a smaller number of pollutants (carbon monoxide, particulates and hydrocarbons) than conventional diesel, because biodiesel burns both cleanly and more efficiently. Even with regular diesel's reduced quantity of sulfur from the LSD (ultra-low sulfur diesel) invention, biodiesel exceeds those levels because it is sulfur-free.

== Alcohol fuels ==
Methanol and ethanol fuel are primary sources of energy; they are convenient fuels for storing and transporting energy. These alcohols can be used in internal combustion engines as alternative fuels. Butane has another advantage: it is the only alcohol-based motor fuel that can be transported readily by existing petroleum-product pipeline networks, instead of only by tanker trucks and railroad cars.

== Ammonia ==
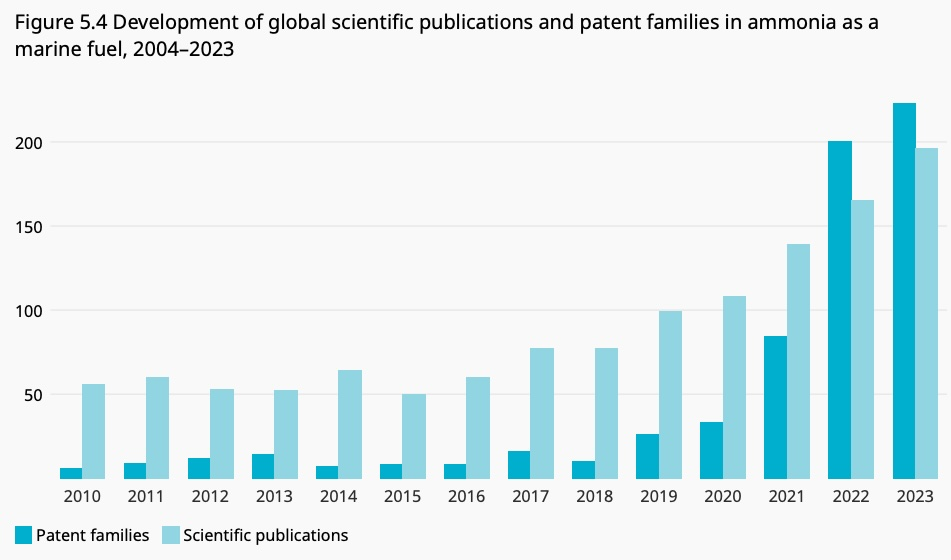
Research and patenting activities into using ammonia as a marine fuel have increased significantly between 2004 and 2023.

Ammonia (NH_{3}) can be used as fuel. Benefits of ammonia for ships include reducing greenhouse gas emissions. Nitrogen reduction is being considered as a possible component for fuel cells and combustion engines through research of conversion of ammonia to nitrogen gas and hydrogen gas.

Ammonia is the simplest molecule that carries hydrogen in a liquid form. It is carbon-free and can be produced using renewable energy. Ammonia can become a transitional fuel soon because of its relative easiness of storage and distribution.

== Emulsion fuel ==
Emulsified fuels include multiple components that are mixed to a water-in-oil emulsion, which are created to improve the fuels combustive properties. Diesel can also be emulsified with water to be used as a fuel. It helps in improving engine efficiency and reducing exhaust emissions.

== Carbon-neutral and negative fuels ==
Carbon-neutral fuel is synthetic fuel—such as methane, gasoline, diesel fuel or jet fuel—produced from renewable or nuclear energy used to hydrogenate waste carbon dioxide recycled from power plant flue exhaust gas or derived from carbolic acid in seawater. Such fuels are potentially carbon neutral because they do not result in a net increase in atmospheric greenhouse gases. To the extent that carbon neutral fuels displace fossil fuels, or if they are produced from waste carbon or seawater carbolic acid, and their combustion is subject to carbon capture at the flue or exhaust pipe, they result in negative carbon dioxide emission and net carbon dioxide removal from the atmosphere, and thus constitute a form of greenhouse gas remediation. Such carbon neutral and negative fuels can be produced by the electrolysis of water to make hydrogen used in the Sabatier reaction to produce methane which may then be stored to be burned later in power plants as synthetic natural gas, transported by pipeline, truck, or tanker ship, or be used in gas to liquids processes such as the Fischer–Tropsch process to make traditional transportation or heating fuels.

Carbon-neutral fuels have been proposed for distributed storage for renewable energy, minimizing problems of wind and solar intermittent, and enabling transmission of wind, water, and solar power through existing natural gas pipelines. Such renewable fuels could alleviate the costs and dependency issues of imported fossil fuels without requiring either electrification of the vehicle fleet or conversion to hydrogen or other fuels, enabling continued compatible and affordable vehicles. Germany has built a 250-kilowatt synthetic methane plant which they are scaling up to 10 megawatts. Audi has constructed a carbon neutral liquefied natural gas (LNG) plant in Werlte, Germany. The plant is intended to produce transportation fuel to offset LNG used in their A3 Sportback g-tron automobiles, and can keep 2,800 metric tons of CO_{2} out of the environment per year at its initial capacity. Other commercial developments are taking place in Columbia, South Carolina, Camarillo, California, and Darlington, England.

The least expensive source of carbon for recycling into fuel is flue-gas emissions from fossil-fuel combustion, where it can be extracted for about US$7.50 per ton. Automobile exhaust gas capture has also been proposed to be economical but would require extensive design changes or retrofitting. Since carbonic acid in seawater is in chemical equilibrium with atmospheric carbon dioxide, extraction of carbon from seawater has been studied. Researchers have estimated that carbon extraction from seawater would cost about $50 per ton. Carbon capture from ambient air is more costly, at between $600 and $1000 per ton and is considered impractical for fuel synthesis or carbon sequestration.

Nighttime wind power is considered the most economical form of electrical power with which to synthesize fuel, because the load curve for electricity peaks sharply during the warmest hours of the day, but wind tends to blow slightly more at night than during the day. Therefore, the price of nighttime wind power is often much less expensive than any alternative. Off-peak wind power prices in high wind penetration areas of the U.S. averaged 1.64 cents per kilowatt-hour in 2009, but only 0.71 cents/kWh during the least expensive six hours of the day. Typically, wholesale electricity costs 2 to 5 cents/kWh during the day. Commercial fuel synthesis companies suggest they can produce fuel for less than petroleum fuels when oil costs more than $55 per barrel. The U.S. Navy estimates that shipboard production of jet fuel from nuclear power would cost about $6 per gallon. While that was about twice the petroleum fuel cost in 2010, it is expected to be much less than the market price in less than five years if recent trends continue. Moreover, since the delivery of fuel to a carrier battle group costs about $8 per gallon, shipboard production is already much less expensive. However, U.S. civilian nuclear power is considerably more expensive than wind power. The Navy's estimate that 100 megawatts can produce 41,000 gallons of fuel per day indicates that terrestrial production from wind power would cost less than $1 per gallon.

== Hydrogen and formic acid ==
Hydrogen is an emissionless fuel. The byproduct of hydrogen burning is water, although some mono-nitrogen oxides NOx are produced when hydrogen is burned with air.

Another fuel is formic acid. The fuel is used by converting it first to hydrogen and using that in a fuel cell. Formic acid is much more easy to store than hydrogen.

== Hydrogen/compressed natural gas mixture ==
HCNG (or H2CNG) is a mixture of compressed natural gas and 4–9 percent hydrogen by energy. Hydrogen could also be used as hydroxy gas for better combustion characteristics of compression-ignition engines. Hydroxy gas is obtained through electrolysis of water.

== Compressed air ==
The air engine is an emission-free piston engine using compressed air as fuel.

== Propane autogas ==
Propane is a cleaner burning, high-performance fuel derived from multiple sources. It is known by many names including propane, LPG (liquified propane gas), LPA (liquid propane autogas), Autogas and others. Propane is a hydrocarbon fuel and is a member of the natural gas family.

Propane as an automotive fuel shares many of the physical attributes of gasoline while reducing tailpipe emissions and well to wheel emissions overall. Propane is the number one alternative fuel in the world and offers an abundance of supply, liquid storage at low pressure, an excellent safety record and large cost savings when compared to traditional fuels.

Propane delivers an octane rating between 104 and 112 depending on the composition of the butane/propane ratios of the mixture. Propane autogas in a liquid injection format captures the phase change from liquid to gas state within the cylinder of the combustion engine producing an "intercooler" effect, reducing the cylinder temperature and increasing air density. The resultant effect allows more advance on the ignition cycle and a more efficient engine combustion.

Propane lacks additives, detergents or other chemical enhancements further reducing the exhaust output from the tailpipe. The cleaner combustion also has fewer particulate emissions, lower NO_{x} due to the complete combustion of the gas within the cylinder, higher exhaust temperatures increasing the efficiency of the catalyst and deposits less acid and carbon inside the engine which extends the useful life of the lubricating oil.

Propane autogas is generated at the well alongside other natural gas and oil products. It is also a by-product of the refining processes which further increase the supply of Propane to the market.

Propane is stored and transported in a liquid state at roughly 5 bar (73 psi) of pressure. Fueling vehicles are similar to gasoline in the speed of delivery with modern fueling equipment. Propane filling stations only require a pump to transfer vehicle fuel and do not require expensive and slow compression systems when compared to compressed natural gas which is usually kept at over 3,000 psi (210 bar).

In a vehicle format, propane autogas can be retrofitted to almost any engine and provide fuel cost savings and lowered emissions while being more efficient as an overall system due to the large, pre-existing propane fueling infrastructure that does not require compressors and the resultant waste of other alternative fuels in well to wheel lifecycles.

== Compressed natural gas ==
Compressed natural gas (CNG) and liquefied natural gas (LNG) are two cleaner combustible alternatives to conventional liquid automobile fuels.

=== Compressed natural gas fuel types ===
CNG vehicles can use both renewable CNG and non-renewable CNG.

Conventional CNG is a fossil fuel. New technologies such as horizontal drilling and hydraulic fracturing to economically access unconventional gas resources, appear to have increased the supply of natural gas in a fundamental way.

Renewable natural gas or biogas is a methane-based gas with similar properties to natural gas that can be used as transportation fuel. Present sources of biogas are mainly landfills, sewage, and animal/agri-waste. Based on the process type, biogas can be divided into the following: biogas produced by anaerobic digestion, landfill gas collected from landfills, treated to remove trace contaminants, and synthetic natural gas (SNG).

=== Practicality ===
CNG powers more than 5 million vehicles worldwide, and just over 150,000 of these are in the U.S. American usage is growing at a dramatic rate.

=== Environmental analysis ===
Because natural gas emits less smog-forming pollutants than other fossil fuels when combusted, cleaner air has been measured in urban localities switching to natural gas vehicles. Tailpipe CO_{2} can be reduced by 15–25% compared to gasoline, diesel. The greatest reductions occur in medium and heavy duty, light duty and refuse truck segments.

CO_{2} reductions of up to 88% are possible by using biogas.

Natural gas and hydrogen are both lighter than air and can be mixed together.

== Nuclear power and radiothermal generators ==
=== Nuclear reactors ===
Nuclear power is any nuclear technology designed to extract usable energy from atomic nuclei via controlled nuclear reactions. Currently, the only controlled method uses nuclear fission in a fissile fuel (with a small fraction of the power coming from subsequent radioactive decay). Use of nuclear fusion for controlled power generation is not yet practical, but is an active area of research.

Nuclear power generally requires a nuclear reactor to heat a working fluid such as water, which is then used to create steam pressure, which is converted into mechanical work for the purpose of generating electricity or propulsion in water. Today, more than 15% of the world's electricity comes from nuclear power, and over 150 nuclear-powered naval vessels have been built.

In theory, electricity from nuclear reactors could also be used for propulsion in space, but this has yet to be demonstrated in a space flight. Some smaller reactors, such as the TOPAZ nuclear reactor, are built to minimize moving parts and use methods that convert nuclear energy to electricity more directly, making them useful for space missions, but this electricity has historically been used for other purposes. Power from nuclear fission has been used in a number of spacecraft, all of them uncrewed. The Soviets up to 1988 orbited 33 nuclear reactors in RORSAT military radar satellites, where electric power generated was used to power a radar unit that located ships on the Earth's oceans. The U.S. also orbited one experimental nuclear reactor in 1965, in the SNAP-10A mission.

=== Thorium fuelled nuclear reactors ===
Thorium-based nuclear power reactors have also become an area of active research in recent years. It is being backed by many scientists and researchers, and Professor James Hansen, the former Director at NASA Goddard Institute for Space Studies has reportedly said, "After studying climate change for over four decades, it's clear to me that the world is heading for a climate catastrophe unless we develop adequate energy sources to replace fossil fuels. Safer, cleaner and cheaper nuclear power can replace coal and is desperately needed as an essential part of the solution". Thorium is 3–4 times more abundant within nature than uranium, and its ore, monazite, is commonly found in sands along bodies of water. Thorium has also gained interest because it could be easier to obtain than uranium. While uranium mines are enclosed underground and thus very dangerous for the miners, thorium is taken from open pits. Monazite is present in countries such as Australia, the United States and India, in quantities large enough to power the earth for thousands of years. As an alternative to uranium-fuelled nuclear reactors, thorium has been proven to add to proliferation, produces radioactive waste for deep geological repositories like technetium-99 (half-life over 200,000 years), and has a longer fuel cycle.

For a list of experimental and presently-operating thorium-fueled reactors, see Thorium fuel cycle § List of thorium-fueled reactors.

=== Radiothermal generators ===
In addition, radioisotopes have been used as alternative fuels, on both lands, and in space. Their use on land is declining due to the danger of theft of isotope and environmental damage if the unit is opened. The decay of radioisotopes generates both heat and electricity in many space probes, particularly probes to outer planets where sunlight is weak, and low temperatures is a problem. Radiothermal generators (RTGs) which use radioisotopes as fuels do not sustain a nuclear chain reaction, but rather generate electricity from the decay of a radioisotope.

== See also ==
- Alcohol fuel – Alcohols used as fuel for internal combustion engines
- Alternative fuel vehicle – Vehicle not powered by petrol or diesel
- Biogas – Gases produced by decomposing organic matter
- Compressed-air vehicle – Car that uses pneumatic motors
- E-diesel – Synthetic diesel fuel
- Energy development – Methods bringing energy into production
- Fischer–Tropsch process – Chemical reactions that convert carbon monoxide and hydrogen into liquid hydrocarbons
- Greasestock – An alternative fuel festival in New York
- Heating value – Amount of heat released by combustion of a quantity of substance
- Heavy metals – Term used for certain metallic elements
- Lead
- List of energy topics – Overview of and topical guide to energy
- Magnesium injection cycle
- Natural gas hydrate – Methane-water lattice compound – A possible future alternative to LNG for transporting natural gas
- Monopropellant – Single-part rocket propellant fuels
- Open burning of waste – Disposal method of waste or garbage often used by third-world countries
- Swiftfuel – Aviation fuel – A potential lead-free alternative to 100LL aviation gasoline.
- Vegetable oil fuel – Alternative fuel in diesel engines
