= Sea6 Energy =

Sea6 Energy Private Ltd.
- Company type: Private
- Industry: Biofuel
- Founded: Chennai, India, July 2010
- Founder: Nelson Vadassery; Sowmya Balendiran; Sailaja Nori; Shrikumar Suryanarayan Sayash Kumar
- Headquarters: Bangalore, India
- Products: Bioplastics, Biostimulants, Food ingredients and Biofuel
- Website: www.sea6energy.com

Sea6 Energy is a seaweed company based in Bangalore, India that focuses on cultivating and processing tropical seaweed species. The company has developed a proprietary cultivation mechanism called the SeaCombine, which can simultaneously harvest and replant seaweed in deep ocean waters, enabling cost-competitive production at scale. The company has also developed proprietary technologies to convert fresh seaweed into environmentally friendly products for a range of industries including agriculture, animal health, food ingredients, bioplastics and renewable chemicals. In 2012, Sea6 Energy was given the title of "Emerging Company of the Year" by the Government of Karnataka.

== Company history ==
As students at the Indian Institute of Technology Madras (IIT Madras) in 2008, the company's four founders—Nelson Vadassery, Sailaja Nori, Sowmya Balendiran, and Sayash Kumar—sought out the help of their professor, Shrikumar Suryanarayan, to aid in entering the iGEM competition hosted by the Massachusetts Institute of Technology. Suryanarayan, now the Managing Director of Sea6 Energy, helped the students enter their project in the competition and spurred their interest in the biofuel industry. Suryanarayan had also previously worked at the Indian biotechnology company, Biocon, where his own interest in studying seaweed as a biofuel was piqued.

The company was founded in July 2010 with funding from a few IIT Madras alumni, Suryanarayan, the Indian Department of Biotechnology, and other investors. The company began operation in Chennai, using laboratories and equipment provided by IIT Madras. The company would later move to their current location in Bangalore to take advantage of facilities and instrumentation at the Centre for Cellular and Molecular Platforms (C-CAMP), a company co-founded by Shrikumar Suryanarayan.

On 31 January 2012, Sea6 Energy signed a deal with Danish biotech company, Novozymes. The goal of the partnership is to facilitate the conversion of seaweed carbohydrates into sugars that can be used to produce ethanol.

== Research and development ==
Traditionally, algal-based biofuels have been derived from microalgae that grow in fresh water sources. Shrikumar Suryanarayan and the 4 co-founders sought to research the viability of macroalgae (seaweed) as a fuel source. To do this, they needed a way to efficiently farm the seaweed, which led to the creation of a farming system built from a marine plastics polymer. Sea6 Energy successfully applied for a patent for their aquatic farming structure in 2012 (one of their two patents that has been published).

Sea6 Energy has successfully converted red seaweed into ethanol and natural gas in their labs. They believe that seaweed can replace fossil fuels and other types of green fuels in a way that is both sustainable and good for the environment. The current goal of Sea6 Energy (along with their partner, Novozymes) is to find an enzyme that breaks down red seaweed carbohydrate into monosaccharides more efficiently. These monosaccharides must undergo fermentation in order to be converted into ethanol.
