= Culture Biosystems =

Renewable energy company

Culture Biosystems, originally known as Culture Fuels, Inc., is a privately owned renewable energy company in the United States. Its technology provides a cultivation platform for large-scale production of algae for conversion into diesel and aviation fuel. Its products provide a hybrid algae cultivation system alternative to open ponds and closed photobioreactors.

== History ==
The company was founded in 2010 by Lawrence A. Walmsley and Dr. Andreas Meiser. Since 2011, the company has partnered with University of South Florida and has been operating a pilot facility.

In 2013, the company received a grant from the state of Florida to increase the production of algae to one acre. Currently, its demonstration facility is in Southwest Florida.

The corporate office is located in New York.

== Technology ==
The firm has developed a hybrid cultivation platforms which are highly-productive, low-cost photobioreactors that float on a body of water or are placed on land. This technology allows the production of different algae strains in a closed cultivation platform for the production of biofuels, aviation fuels, feed, protein, and nutraceuticals. They significantly increase algal biomass density which reduces the capital and energy needed for harvesting equipment. The systems also control and evaporation and the concentration of nutrients, salts and buffers while significantly reducing the amount of water required to grow algae. The firm has combined the two principal ways of growing algae – open ponds and closed photobioreactors – into a hybrid technology system.

== Grants ==
In 2011, the firm received grants from Florida High Tech Corridor Council's Matching Grants Research Program. In 2013, it received its second grant from Florida Department of Agriculture and Consumer Services in partnership with the University of South Florida.
