= Crypthecodinium cohnii =

Scientific classification
- Domain: Eukaryota
- Clade: Sar
- Superphylum: Alveolata
- Phylum: Dinoflagellata
- Class: Dinophyceae
- Order: Peridiniales
- Family: Crypthecodiniaceae
- Genus: Crypthecodinium
- Species: C. cohnii

Binomial name
- Crypthecodinium cohnii (Seligo, 1886) Chatton in Grassé, 1952

Species of single-celled organism

Crypthecodinium cohnii is a species of dinoflagellate microalgae. It is used industrially in the production of docosahexaenoic acid. Crypthecodinium cohnii is a heterotrophic non-photosynthetic Microalgae. C. cohnii can acclimate a higher docosahexaenoic acid to polyunsaturated fatty acids ratio, however current studies are trying to increase the volume of DHA production by creating mutant strains. Studies have shown that an increase in the supply of Dissolved Oxygen results in an increased production of DHA. In addition to oxygen concentration, C. cohnii is known to react to a change in salinity by changing their growth rate. The growth of C. cohnii is highly dependent on their microbiome or environment. Most of the DHA in the Microalgae is found in the phospholipid, phosphatidylcholine. C. cohnii cultures require an organic carbon source to allow for accumulation of DHA. C. cohnii has been shown to accumulate other fatty acids and starch, especially due to nutrient limitation. C. cohnii showed the greatest accumulation of lipids when grown in a pH auxostat culture.
