= LS9, Inc =

Company focused on producing diesel fuel from transgenic organisms (2005-2013)

LS-9 Inc was a venture-funded company focused on producing diesel fuel from transgenic organisms. It launched in 2005, took in $81 million in investment, and in 2013 was sold to Renewable Energy Group for $40 million in cash and stock, and an additional $21.5 million if technology and production milestones were met.

== Process ==
Life Sustain 9-Billion uses a one step consolidated method to engineer biofuels, using microbial metabolism. Their technology allows the selection of carbon chain length, branching, saturation, and chemical functionality of each product. LS9 microbial catalysts carryout all chemical conversions in a single step fermentation and produce an immiscible product that is naturally secreted from the cell. Centrifugation or simple settling recovers the final product from the fermentation medium. No distillation is required, making the process very cost and energy efficient. This process is what distinguishes them from competitors. Their platform is to be able to design a microbial catalyst to produce a purified desired compound in a single step conversion, then using the same equipment to make a different product with a different catalyst.

== Feedstocks ==
LS9 utilizes sugar cane, corn syrup, sweet sorghum syrup, molasses, glycerin and biomass hydrolysate as potential feedstocks for their fuel production. They obtain these feedstocks through numerous partnerships in various countries including the US, Brazil, Australia, and India. Their catalysts enable them to assimilate both pentose and hexose sugars. The ability to leverage multiple feedstocks provides strategic advantages including the option to change feedstock based on economics and availability, the option to scale in diverse geographies local raw materials, and an ability to avoid competition with food.

== Products ==
LS9 has a wide array of products that all stem from their specialty ester product family, which pairs a fatty acid (C8-C18) with a series of alcohols (C1-C14). These currently are added to the fermentation vessel, but ultimately will be made in situ. The modifications to their bacteria fermenters will allow the alteration of chain length, branch points and saturation/unsaturation. Their products currently include LS Diesel (Made from fatty acid methyl or ethyl esters (FAME/FAEE) or alkanes), LS Kerosene (made from low chain length FAME) and LS jet fuel. In the future they plan on engineering long chain molecules for personal care markets, as well as amines/amides for agricultural chemicals and adhesives. Overall, their goal is to create a family of fuel products targeted at the very large diesel market. One particular product towards this endeavour is their UltraClean Diesel

== LS9 UltraClean Diesel ==
One of LS9’s premier products is its UltraClean diesel. This diesel product offers numerous benefits in comparison to both regular diesel fuel, as well as traditional biodiesel. LS9 diesel is above the competition in many varying facets including cetane number, sulphur content, aromatic compound content, cloud point and oxidative stability. In 2010, LS9 UltraClean Diesel was awarded status as an officially registered fuel by the United States Environment Protection Agency (EPA). This fuel contributes to a reduction in carbon footprint by 85% in comparison to other fuels. As a registered fuel, LS9's UltraClean Diesel can be sold commercially in the United States.

=== Cetane Number (CN) ===
A fuel’s cetane number is measurement of the combustion quality of diesel fuel during compression ignition. Fuels with higher cetane number have shorter ignition delays, providing more time for the fuel combustion process to be completed. Generally, diesel engines operate well with a CN from 40 to 55, whereas LS9 UltraClean has a CN of 70. In North America, most states adopt ASTM D975 as their diesel fuel standard and the minimum cetane number is set at 40, with typical values in the 42-45 range. In Europe, with a minimum cetane index of 46 and a minimum cetane number of 51. Premium diesel fuel can have a cetane number as high as 60

=== Sulfur ===
Sulfur is a major contributor to the greenhouse gas sulfur hexafluoride (SF_{6}), a potent greenhouse gas that the Intergovernmental Panel on Climate Change, has evaluated, with a global warming potential of 22,800 times that of carbon dioxide when compared over a 100-year period Sulfur hexafluoride is also extremely long-lived due to being inert in the troposphere and stratosphere, and has an estimated atmospheric lifetime of 800–3200 years. Due to these facts, it is very beneficial to contain low sulfur levels in fuel. LS9 diesel contains just over half (8 vs 15) of the sulfur

=== Aromatic Compounds ===
Aromatic compounds in fuel contribute to soot production. Therefore, they have been under investigation and restrictions. The California Air Resources Board (CARB) and the EU will have limits at 10% and 14% respectively, while the U.S. federal specifications limit aromatics to 35% Soot production plays a major role in smog and environmental concerns, causing for these restrictions to be put in place. LS9 UltraClean diesel has been shown to have no aromatic compounds, whereas fossil fuel diesel contains approximately 10% by volume aromatics.

=== Cloud Point ===
The cloud point of a fuel is the temperature at which solids dissolved within form precipitates, giving the fuel a cloudy appearance. When a fuel is below its cloud point waxes or biowaxes form within the fuel, clogging fuel filters and injectors. The lower the cloud point, the colder temperatures the fuel can be exposed to without fear of waxy build up. Of the biodiesel alternatives pictured, LS9 biodiesel offers the lowest cloud point, increasing its uses within cold climates.

=== Oxidative Stability ===
One of the major technical issue facing biodiesel is its susceptibility to oxidation upon exposure to oxygen in ambient air. This becomes a major issue when stored for extended periods of time. This susceptibility is due to its content of unsaturated fatty acid chains. Besides the presence of air, various other factors influence the oxidation process of biodiesel including presence of light, elevated temperature. Where most commercial biofuels only are stable for 3–5 hours, LS9 biodiesel is stable for greater than 6 hours when exposed to oxygen.

=== LS9 Inc. Patents ===
To date, LS9 has published 29 patents related to the biofuel industry. These patents range from processes detailing the generation of aldehydes, carboxylic acids, esters, alkenes, alkynes, and fatty acid derivatives. It is critical to note that many of the patents published are built upon previous patents and shows a continued commitment by LS9 in the biofuel industry.

Of particular importance to LS9’s potential for success may lie in its diversity in patent publications. This concept is illustrated below through the systematic review of LS9’s most pivotal patent as they relate to the main components of biofuel generation.

In line with LS9's main initiatives of using synthetic microorganisms for the production of biofuel components, LS9 has been, for a period of years (2008–2013) been pushing patents for specific enzymes involved in fatty acid synthesis and metabolism. This is of particular importance since enzymes are key regulators in metabolic pathways and the opportunity to successfully patent such an enzyme may prove of extreme value to a company vested in economic interests being generated in that area of research.

== PPTase ==
One particular component, which LS9 has been successful in patenting is a key regulator in the initiation of fatty acid biosynthesis known as phosphopantetheinyl transferase (PPTase). This enzyme is responsible for transferring 4`-phosphopantetheine (4`-PP) from coenzyme A to a conserved serine residue on acyl carrier protein (ACP), which is responsible for shuttling around 4`-PP. This pathway is essential for the functioning of the Fatty Acid Synthase (FAS) enzyme and allows LS9 a certain degree of monopoly in fatty acid generation from microorganisms since it has patented such an integral component.

=== Legal Implications ===
Another intriguing aspect of this patent is that for LS9 to employ it, they cannot continue using FAS proteins which have been patented by other companies. Therefore, LS9 must be careful in how they implement this patent. Thus far, no conflict-of-interest claims have been filed against this patent.

=== Overview of Patent Specifications ===
The initial patent application contained 43 components which LS9 endeavoured to have covered under this patent. Of these 43 components, 5 are protected under this patent. These include the use of a protein with 80% homology to PPTase for the purposes of generation of fatty acids or aldehydes, culturing a cell expressing such a PPTase under conditions permissive for production of fatty acids or aldehydes, overexpressing PPTase in growth medium selective for fatty acid production, and also delineates a means of overcoming iron-induced inhibition of PPTase. These specifications address pretreatment conditions detailing decreasing iron-inhibition present in the microbes used for this research (See Above).

=== Submission ===
Submitted in 2011, this patent was published under the USPA, under application number 20130035513 on February 7, 2013 under the title of Methods and Compositions for Enhanced Production of Fatty Aldehydes and Fatty Alcohols.

== Gene Cassette and Culture Medium for Commercial Purposes ==
This patent builds upon several other patents filed by LS9 and forms a gene cassette plasmid which has the potential to be taken up by target microorganism and used to generate fatty acids. One of the main components of this patent is that the target microorganism will use the fermentation of carbohydrates for a direct route for the production of fatty esters without producing undesired side-products like glycerin characteristic of conventional fatty ester production. To achieve this, the pathway and enzymes have been engineered from pCLTFW.atfA1, pLoxPcat2, pCLTFWcat, placZ R6K1, and POpAm. These were not the intellectual property of the LS9 before this point. However, after acceptance of this patent, the combination of these plasmids, the final product has achieved a distinction significant enough to warrant the allowance of a patent to this process.

=== Legal Implications ===
There does not exist any legal implications implicit in the application. The assortment of genes encoded on the cassette appear to be a unique cluster engineered from several organisms. At this time, there exists no conflict-of-interest claims filed against this patent.

=== Submission ===
Submitted on April 11, 2010, this patent was published under the USPA, under application number 20100257777 on October 14, 2010 under the title of Production of Commercial Biodiesel from Genetically Modified Organisms.

=== Investment ===
LS9 has been a company very sought after by investors, both at the corporate and governmental level. Numerous firms have invested into their company, realizing the potential of their one-step process. BlackRock, an investment firm, donated 30 million dollars, much of which was used as capital start-up. In 2011, they were recognized by the US Department of Energy and given 9 million dollars in order for them to improve their integrated process to convert biomass feedstocks into fermentable sugars and then into diesel and other fuel and chemical products. In 2012, with the opening of the Florida product testing plant, LS9 was given 4.5 million dollars from the Florida Opportunity fund. This fund invests millions of dollars each year into clean, renewable energy in the state of Florida.

=== Economic Feasibility ===
There exist many biofuel companies which face the harsh challenge of reducing capital investment while trying to increase energy yield generated from their products. To overcome this challenge, LS9 uses microbial fatty acid metabolism pathways in many of its reaction chambers to increase hydrocarbon yields. The rationale behind LS9's commitment to the use of microbial species lies in their resilient nature to have undergone many selective pressures thus having the potential to be used in conditions necessary for biofuel generation. It is these attributes of microbes and leading technologies in genome sequencing and synthetic biology which LS9 has harnessed to yield biofuels which do not suffer from many of the economical pressures that conventional reaction chamber biofuel generation methods suffer from. These are discussed below.

== Separation of Compounds ==
In many current biofuel generation endeavours, the processes of differentiating and separating desired components from undesired ones leads to losses in both net energy yield and capital loss. Due to this, LS9 has developed a process where in their reaction chambers, shown above, utilize the natural properties of their desired components. Using both solvent composition and the realization that most desired components in biofuel generation possess a certain degree of hydrophobicity, LS9 has engineered their microbes to carry out their reactions in the aqueous-like phase, which is of lower hydrophobic character, and their desired components are secreted and float to the top forming a hydrophobic phase. This phase is easily accessible to collection apparatuses and requires little energy to collect.

== Lack of Heat Generation ==
Due to the isolated nature of the microbial metabolism in cell culture, wherein the biofuel components are produced there is no need to increase temperatures to make reactions run at appreciable rates. Rather substrate availability and growth conditions govern the reaction rate of the desired component. This is of critical importance when this principle is juxtaposed with the energy-intensive processes of most biofuel companies.
