= GreenFuel Technologies Corporation =

GreenFuel Technologies Corporation (GFT) was a startup that developed a process of growing algae using emissions from fossil fuels to produce biofuel from algae.

Based in Cambridge, Massachusetts, Greenfuel ceased operations on May 13, 2009, after having raised more than $70 million in investments, citing economic circumstances, and having run out of funds.

== History ==
The GFT president, chief technology officer and the inventor of a newly patented system for growing pollution-digesting algae inexpensively on an industrial scale is Isaac Berzin, who founded the company in April 2001. Time magazine included Berzin in its list of the 100 most influential people in the world in 2008.

A beta emission reduction system was installed at an MIT cogeneration facility in 2004 and after performing beyond expectations was moved to a larger power plant in fall 2005. Pilot units were tested at power plants in Arizona, Massachusetts and New York. Although the algal biomass produced by the process consists of proteins, lipids and carbohydrates which could be used to produce a variety of products, GFT seems to be focusing on biofuel products. GreenFuel's large scale algae to biofuel process at the Arizona Public Service Redhawk power facility won the 2006 Platts Emissions Energy Project of the Year Award.

In November 2006 Arizona Public Service Company (APS) announced that it and its partner GreenFuel Technologies will attempt to replicate their success of creating biofuels from algae grown using carbon dioxide (CO_{2}) emissions from a power plant.

In 2007, the company had to shut down its third-generation bioreactor facility in Arizona after the plant produced more algae than the company's equipment could handle. At the same time, the company learned that its algae harvesting system would cost twice as much as expected. In 2007 they announced a restructuring, some 25 employees, about half the company's staff, were laid off as a result of the plant shutdown.

== Principal investors ==
The principle investors were Access Private Equity, Draper Fisher Jurvetson and Polaris Venture Partners.

== Technology ==
Known as Emissions-to-Biofuels, the process could use a photosynthetic bioreactor supplied with exhaust gases from a fossil fuel combustion source to grow algae. As smokestack emissions are delivered to the algae bioreactor, carbon dioxide and other pollutants are absorbed and utilized by the algae to grow at an exponential rate. Once harvested, the algae is processed to produce a variety of solids such as protein and bioplastics, gases such as methane, and biofuels such as ethanol and biodiesel.

== Application ==
Sources of carbon rich exhaust include manufacturing facilities and electricity generation plants, especially those which burn coal. Once the algal biomass is harvested and processed, the resulting fuel may be sold for additional revenue or utilized on-site.

== Benefits ==
The biofuel yield using the GreenFuel technique is 30 times higher per hectare compared to the yield of oil derived from conventional terrestrial crops. Emissions of carbon dioxide are reduced by 40% and emissions of oxides of nitrogen are reduced by up to 85%. Plant retrofits can be made with minimal disruption to existing facilities.

== Large-scale algae farming plants ==
GreenFuel Technologies had launched the second phase of a major project with Spanish renewable energy firm Aurantia to build a large-scale algae farming plant adjacent to a CO_{2}-spewing cement plant near Jerez, Spain.

== Awards ==
- 2006 Energy Emission Project of the Year - Platts Global Energy Awards
- 2006 Frost Sullivan Bio-based fuels technology Innovation of the Year Award
- 2006 Red Herring
