= BioFields =

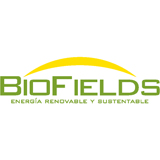
- Industry: Biofuel
- Founded: Mexico City, Mexico (2006)
- Headquarters: Paseo de la Reforma 284, Piso 17. Colonia Juárez. Mexico City, Mexico
- Products: Ethanol
- Website: www.biofields.com

BioFields is a Mexican industrial group that produces biofuels from blue-green algae (cyanobacteria).

The company was founded in 2006, it has a commercial agreement with Algenol Biofuels the company that owns the technology to Direct Ethanol, which allows the production of blue-green algae based biofuels. BioFields got the first license to use such technology in Mexico, specifically in Puerto Libertad, in Pitiquito, Sonora, because the conditions of the place are ideal for the development of this technology (approximately 328 days of sunshine a year), it also has a nearby source of carbon dioxide from the exhaust of a large power plant, it is close to the sea and has great extent of dry, non-arable land.

BioFields’ technology Direct to Ethanol uses non-toxic blue-green algae to produce biofuels in a fully enclosed secure system. This technology optimizes the metabolism of blue-green algae creating a new pathway for the use and fixation of carbon resulting in the synthesis of ethanol. The blue-green algae proliferates rapidly and uses efficiently sunlight, carbon dioxide and inorganic elements, for the production of ethanol or other biofuels.

The capture of carbon dioxide allows to accelerate the process of photosynthesis using the blue-green algae to convert the sun's energy in the form of intracellular sugar, which provides vital energy to grow and reproduce as well as to double its population in a few hours and it can be grown on farms allowing the biofuels production at an industrial level.

Their first project is Sonora Fields, consisting of 22,000 hectares of land in the desert of Sonora, Mexico.
