= Algenol =

American biotechnology company

Algenol Biotech, LLC
- Company type: Private
- Industry: Biofuels
- Founder: Paul Woods, Craig Smith, Ed Legere, Alejandro Gonzalez
- Headquarters: Fort Myers, Florida
- Revenue: US$ 3.1 million
- Number of employees: 127
- Website: www.algenol.com

Algenol is an industrial biotechnology company that is commercializing patented algae technology for production of ethanol and other fuels. The company was founded in 2006 and is headquartered in Fort Myers, Florida. The company uses proprietary technologies to produce various products, including personal care products, food supplements, and industrial products, from a patented strain of cyanobacteria and a proprietary photobioreactor system.

== History ==
Algenol was founded in 2006 by Paul Woods, Craig Smith, and Ed Legere. In 2008 the company announced it would begin commercial production of ethanol by 2009 in the Sonoran Desert in northwest Mexico. However, the company was still not in commercial production by 2015. In October 2015, founder Paul Woods resigned and the company announced they were laying off 25% of the staff and changing focus to “water treatment and carbon capture" and possibly return to fuels in the future.

In 2016, their name changed to Algenol Biotech LLC and the company added other algae-based sustainable products to its portfolio.

== Locations ==
Algenol has a large facility in Southwest Florida, just north of Florida Gulf Coast University in Fort Myers which opened in October 2010. The aim of the facility is to produce commercially viable fuel from algae. The site features research labs including engineering facilities, advanced molecular biology, CO_{2} management, separations, and green chemistry advanced labs and an outdoor process development production unit on 40 acres. In October 2011, Algenol began construction on a pilot-scale Integrated Biorefinery, allowing the company to work with algae from a single strain in the lab all the way to commercial-scale production.

Algenol also has subsidiaries located in Berlin, Germany and Zug, Switzerland.

== Research and projects ==
One of Algenol's primary research goals has been to produce four fuels—ethanol, gasoline, jet, and diesel fuel—at commercial scale from marine cyanobacteria using patented bioreactors. They received $22 million of funding from the U.S. Department of Energy from 2010 through 2013 for a project to prove viability of algal-produced ethanol at commercial scales using carbon dioxide captured from industrial sources. From this project, they built a 2-acre system with over 6,000 photobioreactors and they were able to operate 4,000 of these for over 500 days. While this project made significant progress towards large-scale algal biofuel production, the 2015 report from the Department of Energy notes that it is "unclear whether closed photobioreactors will ever be a viable commercial option".

Algenol licenses the DIRECT TO ETHANOL® technology. One of these licenses is with BioFields SAPI de CV in Mexico, which has access to over 42,000 acres of non-arable land in the Sonoran Desert in Mexico. Algenol has stated that they are discussing commercial "Direct to Ethanol" projects with several partners in the United States, South America, Israel, and Africa.

A 2017 report from Biofuelwatch has criticized Algenol as a case-study of many failed algae biofuel ventures.

== Partnerships and funding ==
Algenol has a number of partners including the United States National Renewable Energy Laboratory, BioFields in Mexico, Reliance Industries Ltd. in Mumbai, India, and Membrane Technology and Research. Algenol also is partnered with Lee County, Florida, the U.S. Department of Energy, and multiple universities including Florida Gulf Coast University, Georgia Tech, and Humboldt University of Berlin.

In December 2009, Algenol received a $25 million United States Department of Energy grant to help build the Integrated Biorefinery Direct to Ethanol project in Lee County, Florida. Algenol also received a $10M grant from Lee County to employ people in Lee County and also build the Integrated Biorefinery Direct to Ethanol project. In 2016, the Office of Energy Efficiency and Renewable Energy (part of the U.S. Department of Energy) announced another $15 million grant to be split between Algenol and two other companies to continue research on commercial-scale biofuel production.
