= Algaemia =

Presence of green algae in the bloodstream

Algaemia is a secondary term that refers to the rare yet emerging condition in which green algae enter the bloodstream. Members of the genus Prototheca are the most common causes of human algaemia. Prototheca and Chlorella are the only two known algae genera capable of inflicting disease on mammals. The majority of cases are observed in dairy cattle as a cause of bovine mastitis as well as other domesticated animals. Cases of algaemia have been observed in dogs and cats as well. Few cases have been observed in humans. Human cases of protothecosis are examined on a case-by-case basis due to the particularity of each case. Protothecosis infection is classified based on the symptoms: (i) cutaneous lesions, (ii) olecranon bursitis, and (iii) disseminated multi-organ infections.

== Symptoms and signs ==
Protothecosis can affect anyone but is most commonly seen with more severe symptoms in those who have preexisting conditions. Individuals with a weak immune system have been shown to experience the worst symptoms. Many symptoms are not specific to this infection and can be hard to differentiate. Prototheca is not included as a typical infection that is screened for and is usually not identified without examination by microscope. Polymerase chain reaction tests have shown to assists in the identification of Prototheca. Symptoms include but are not limited to: numbness in the extremities, olecranon bursitis or general inflammation, cutaneous infections in the hair, skin or fingernails, skin lesions, difficulty breathing, respiratory failure, multiple organ failure, and can result in death if not treated in the early stages of infection.

== Causes ==
The algal cells are commonly found in the soil and water of many regions. Prototheca, especially P. wickerhamii and P. zopfii, can colonize the skin, fingernails, respiratory and digestive tracts. Prototheca algae cells can enter the bloodstream through open wounds, mucous membrane pathways, or the ingestion or inhalation of the cells. Individuals who are immunocompromised begin to see more concerning symptoms as the cells build up within the bloodstream.

== Treatments ==
Treatments for human protothecosis can range from pharmaceutical to surgical efforts. Anti-fungal medications such as ketoconazole, itraconazole, and amphotericin B are commonly given drugs for treatment. Amphotericin B has proven to be the most effective but failure to treat or cure is not uncommon. Surgery is an option in some cases but is only when the infection remains localized in an area that can be excised.

== History ==
Prototheca is a genus of algae first identified by Wilhelm Krüger in 1894. Krüger first classified Prototheca as fungi. It was later reclassified as algae. It is believed that this genus of algae began with photosynthetic ability but over time transitioned to a parasitic form. Unlike most algae, prototheca cells lack chlorophyll and instead rely on a host for nutrients. Two groups within Prototheca have been identified: those typically associated with cattle (P. ciferrii and P. bovis), and those considered human-associated (P. wickerhamii, P. zopfii, and P. miyajii). P. wickerhamii and P. zopfii are the predominant algae associated with algaemia. Prototheca can exist in a variety of environments but have been found frequently in warm and humid regions. This specific algae is more prevalent in the southern and southeastern portions of the United States as well as regions of northeastern Australia, southern portions of Europe, and Japan. The algal cells have been identified in samples from sewage, fresh and saltwater, animal feces, and some foods.
