= Pathogen =

Biological entity that causes disease in its host

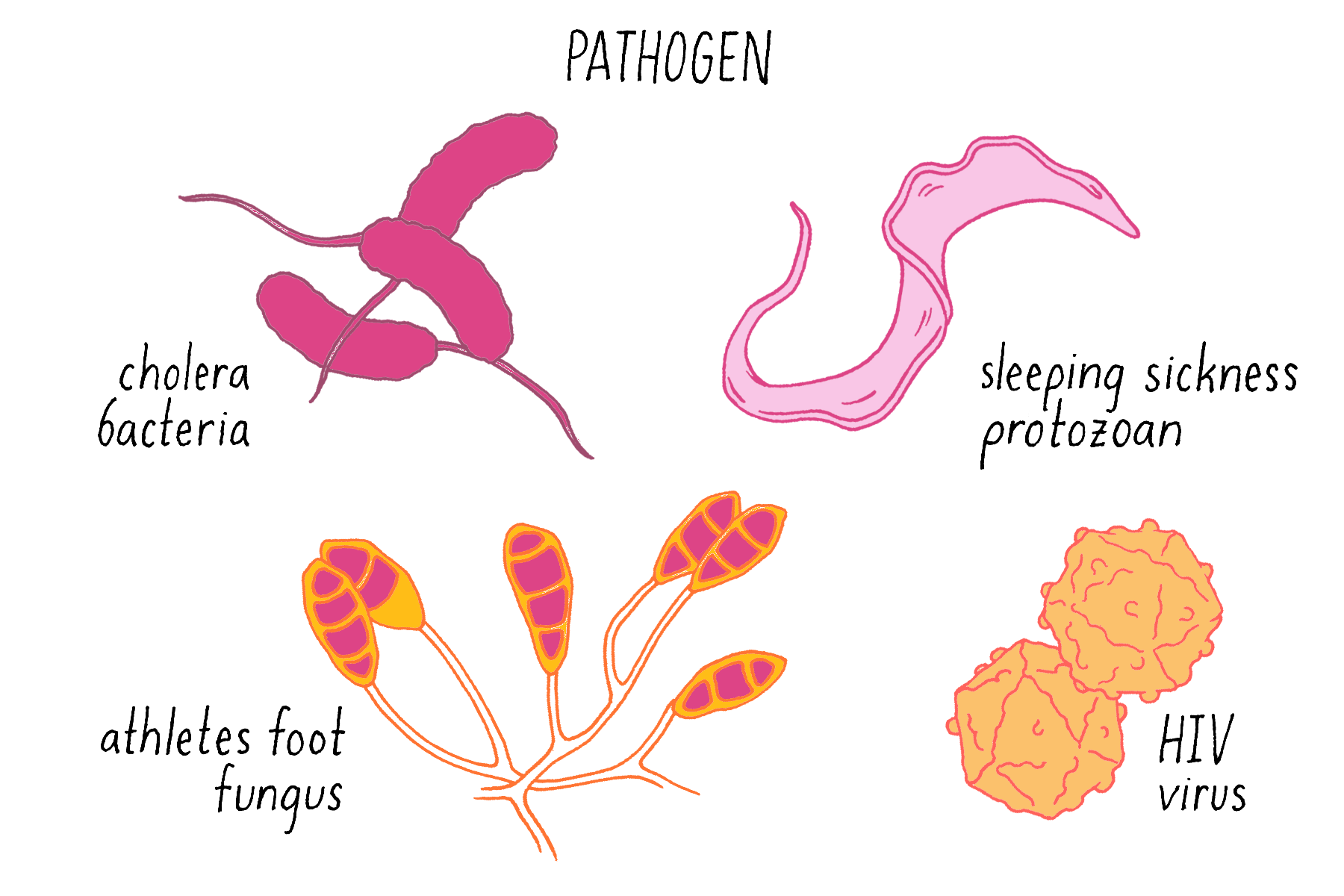
A micro-organism (such as a bacterium, fungus, virus, or protozoan) that can infect a host and cause disease.

In biology, a pathogen (from Greek πάθος (pathos) 'suffering, passion' and -γενής (-genēs) 'producer of'), in the oldest and broadest sense, is any organism, agent or micro-organism that can produce disease. A pathogen may also be referred to as an infectious agent, or simply a germ.

The term pathogen came into use in the 1880s. Typically, the term pathogen is used to describe an infectious microorganism or agent, such as a virus, bacterium, protozoan, prion, viroid, or fungus. Small animals, such as parasitic worm and insects, can also cause or transmit disease. However, these animals are usually referred to as parasites rather than pathogens. The scientific study of microscopic organisms, including microscopic pathogenic organisms, is called microbiology, while parasitology refers to the scientific study of parasites and the organisms that host them.

There are several pathways through which pathogens can invade a host. The principal pathways have different episodic time frames, but soil has the longest or most persistent potential for harboring a pathogen.

Diseases in humans that are caused by infectious agents are known as pathogenic diseases. Not all diseases are caused by pathogens, such as black lung from exposure to the pollutant coal dust, genetic disorders like sickle cell disease, and autoimmune diseases like lupus.

== Pathogenicity ==
Pathogenicity is the potential disease-causing capacity of pathogens, involving a combination of infectivity (pathogen's ability to infect hosts) and virulence (severity of host disease). Koch's postulates are used to establish causal relationships between microbial pathogens and diseases. Whereas meningitis can be caused by a variety of bacterial, viral, fungal, and parasitic pathogens, cholera is only caused by some strains of Vibrio cholerae. Additionally, some pathogens may only cause disease in hosts with an immunodeficiency. These opportunistic infections often involve hospital-acquired infections among patients already combating another condition.

Infectivity involves pathogen transmission through direct contact with the bodily fluids or airborne droplets of infected hosts, indirect contact involving contaminated areas/items, or transfer by living vectors like mosquitos and ticks. The basic reproduction number of an infection is the expected number of subsequent cases it is likely to cause through transmission.

Virulence involves pathogens extracting host nutrients for their survival, evading host immune systems by producing microbial toxins and causing immunosuppression. Optimal virulence describes a theorized equilibrium between a pathogen spreading to additional hosts to parasitize resources, while lowering their virulence to keep hosts living for vertical transmission to their offspring.

== Types ==
=== Algae ===
Algae include single-celled eukaryotes that are generally non-pathogenic. Green algae from the genus Prototheca lack chlorophyll and are known to cause the disease protothecosis in humans, dogs, cats, and cattle, typically involving the soil-associated species Prototheca wickerhamii.

=== Bacteria ===
Bacteria are single-celled prokaryotes that range in size from 0.15 and 700 μM. While the vast majority are either harmless or beneficial to their hosts, such as members of the human gut microbiome that support digestion, a small percentage are pathogenic and cause infectious diseases. Bacterial virulence factors include adherence factors to attach to host cells, invasion factors supporting entry into host cells, capsules to prevent opsonization and phagocytosis, toxins, and siderophores to acquire iron.

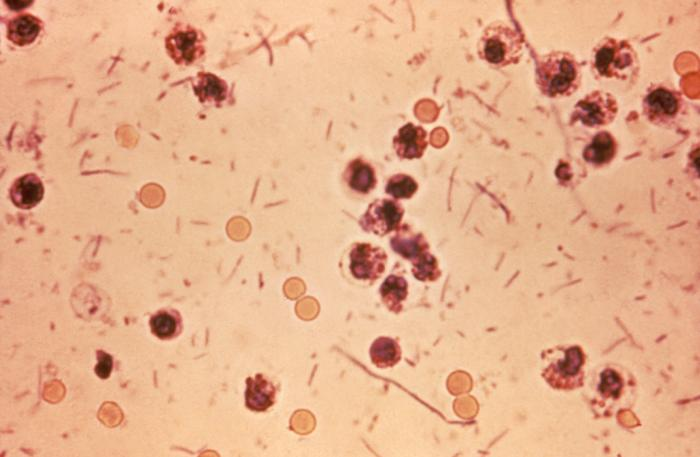
A photomicrograph of a stool that has shigella dysentery. These bacteria typically cause foodborne illness.

The bacterial disease tuberculosis, primarily caused by Mycobacterium tuberculosis, has one of the highest disease burdens, killing 1.6 million people in 2021, mostly in Africa and Southeast Asia. Bacterial pneumonia is primarily caused by Streptococcus pneumoniae, Staphylococcus aureus, Klebsiella pneumoniae, and Haemophilus influenzae. Foodborne illnesses typically involve Campylobacter, Clostridium perfringens, Escherichia coli, Listeria monocytogenes, and Salmonella. Other infectious diseases caused by pathogenic bacteria include tetanus, typhoid fever, diphtheria, and leprosy.

=== Fungi ===
Fungi are eukaryotic organisms that can function as pathogens. There are approximately 300 known fungi that are pathogenic to humans, including Candida albicans, which is the most common cause of thrush, and Cryptococcus neoformans, which can cause a severe form of meningitis. Typical fungal spores are 4.7 μm long or smaller.

=== Prions ===
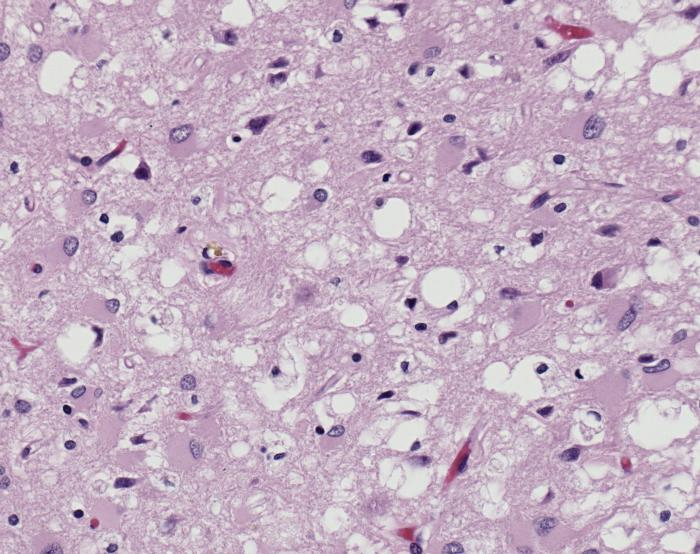
Magnified 100× and stained. This photomicrograph of the brain tissue shows the presence of the prominent spongiotic changes in the cortex, with the loss of neurons in a case of a variant of Creutzfeldt-Jakob disease (vCJD).

Prions are misfolded proteins that transmit their abnormal folding pattern to other copies of the protein without using nucleic acids. Besides obtaining prions from others, these misfolded proteins arise from genetic differences, either due to family history or sporadic mutations. Plants uptake prions from contaminated soil and transport them into their stem and leaves, potentially transmitting the prions to herbivorous animals. Additionally, wood, rocks, plastic, glass, cement, stainless steel, and aluminum have been shown binding, retaining, and releasing prions, showcasing that the proteins resist environmental degradation.

Prions are best known for causing transmissible spongiform encephalopathy (TSE) diseases like Creutzfeldt–Jakob disease (CJD), variant Creutzfeldt–Jakob disease (vCJD), Gerstmann–Sträussler–Scheinker syndrome (GSS), fatal familial insomnia (FFI), and kuru in humans.

While prions are typically viewed as pathogens that cause protein amyloid fibers to accumulate into neurodegenerative plaques, Susan Lindquist led research showing that yeast use prions to pass on evolutionarily beneficial traits.

=== Viroids ===
Not to be confused with virusoids or viruses, viroids are the smallest known infectious pathogens. Viroids are small single-stranded, circular RNA that are only known to cause plant diseases, such as the potato spindle tuber viroid that affects various agricultural crops. Viroid RNA is not protected by a protein coat, and it does not encode any proteins, only acting as a ribozyme to catalyze other biochemical reactions.

=== Viruses ===
Viruses are generally between 20–200 nm in diameter. For survival and replication, viruses inject their genome into host cells, insert those genes into the host genome, and hijack the host's machinery to produce hundreds of new viruses until the cell bursts open to release them for additional infections. The lytic cycle describes this active state of rapidly killing hosts, while the lysogenic cycle describes potentially hundreds of years of dormancy while integrated in the host genome. Alongside the taxonomy organized by the International Committee on Taxonomy of Viruses (ICTV), the Baltimore classification separates viruses by seven classes of mRNA production:

- I: dsDNA viruses (e.g., Adenoviruses, Herpesviruses, and Poxviruses) cause herpes, chickenpox, and smallpox
- II: ssDNA viruses (+ strand or sense) DNA (e.g., Parvoviruses) include parvovirus B19
- III: dsRNA viruses (e.g., Reoviruses) include rotaviruses
- IV: (+)ssRNA viruses (+ strand or sense) RNA (e.g., Coronaviruses, Picornaviruses, and Togaviruses) cause COVID-19, dengue fever, Hepatitis A, Hepatitis C, rubella, and yellow fever
- V: (−)ssRNA viruses (− strand or antisense) RNA (e.g., Orthomyxoviruses and Rhabdoviruses) cause ebola, influenza, measles, mumps, and rabies
- VI: ssRNA-RT viruses (+ strand or sense) RNA with DNA intermediate in life-cycle (e.g., Retroviruses) cause HIV/AIDS
- VII: dsDNA-RT viruses DNA with RNA intermediate in life-cycle (e.g., Hepadnaviruses) cause Hepatitis B

=== Other parasites ===
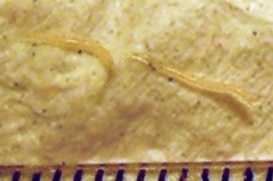
Two pinworms next to a ruler, measuring 6 millimeters in length

Protozoans are single-celled eukaryotes that feed on microorganisms and organic tissues. Many protozoans act as pathogenic parasites to cause diseases like malaria, amoebiasis, giardiasis, toxoplasmosis, cryptosporidiosis, trichomoniasis, Chagas disease, leishmaniasis, African trypanosomiasis (sleeping sickness), Acanthamoeba keratitis, and primary amoebic meningoencephalitis (naegleriasis).

Parasitic worms (helminths) are macroparasites that can be seen by the naked eye. Worms live and feed in their living host, acquiring nutrients and shelter in the digestive tract or bloodstream of their host. They also manipulate the host's immune system by secreting immunomodulatory products which allows them to live in their host for years. Helminthiasis is the generalized term for parasitic worm infections, which typically involve roundworms, tapeworms, and flatworms.

== Pathogen hosts ==
=== Bacteria ===
While bacteria are typically viewed as pathogens, they serve as hosts to bacteriophage viruses (commonly known as phages). The bacteriophage life cycle involves the viruses injecting their genome into bacterial cells, inserting those genes into the bacterial genome, and hijacking the bacteria's machinery to produce hundreds of new phages until the cell bursts open to release them for additional infections. Typically, bacteriophages are only capable of infecting a specific species or strain.

Streptococcus pyogenes uses a Cas9 nuclease to cleave foreign DNA matching the Clustered Regularly Interspaced Short Palindromic Repeats (CRISPR) associated with bacteriophages, removing the viral genes to avoid infection. This mechanism has been modified for artificial CRISPR gene editing.

=== Plants ===
Plants can play host to a wide range of pathogen types, including viruses, bacteria, fungi, nematodes, and even other plants. Notable plant viruses include the papaya ringspot virus, which has caused millions of dollars of damage to farmers in Hawaii and Southeast Asia, and the tobacco mosaic virus which caused scientist Martinus Beijerinck to coin the term "virus" in 1898. Bacterial plant pathogens cause leaf spots, blight, and rot in many plant species. The most common bacterial pathogens for plants are Pseudomonas syringae and Ralstonia solanacearum, which cause leaf browning and other issues in potatoes, tomatoes, and bananas.

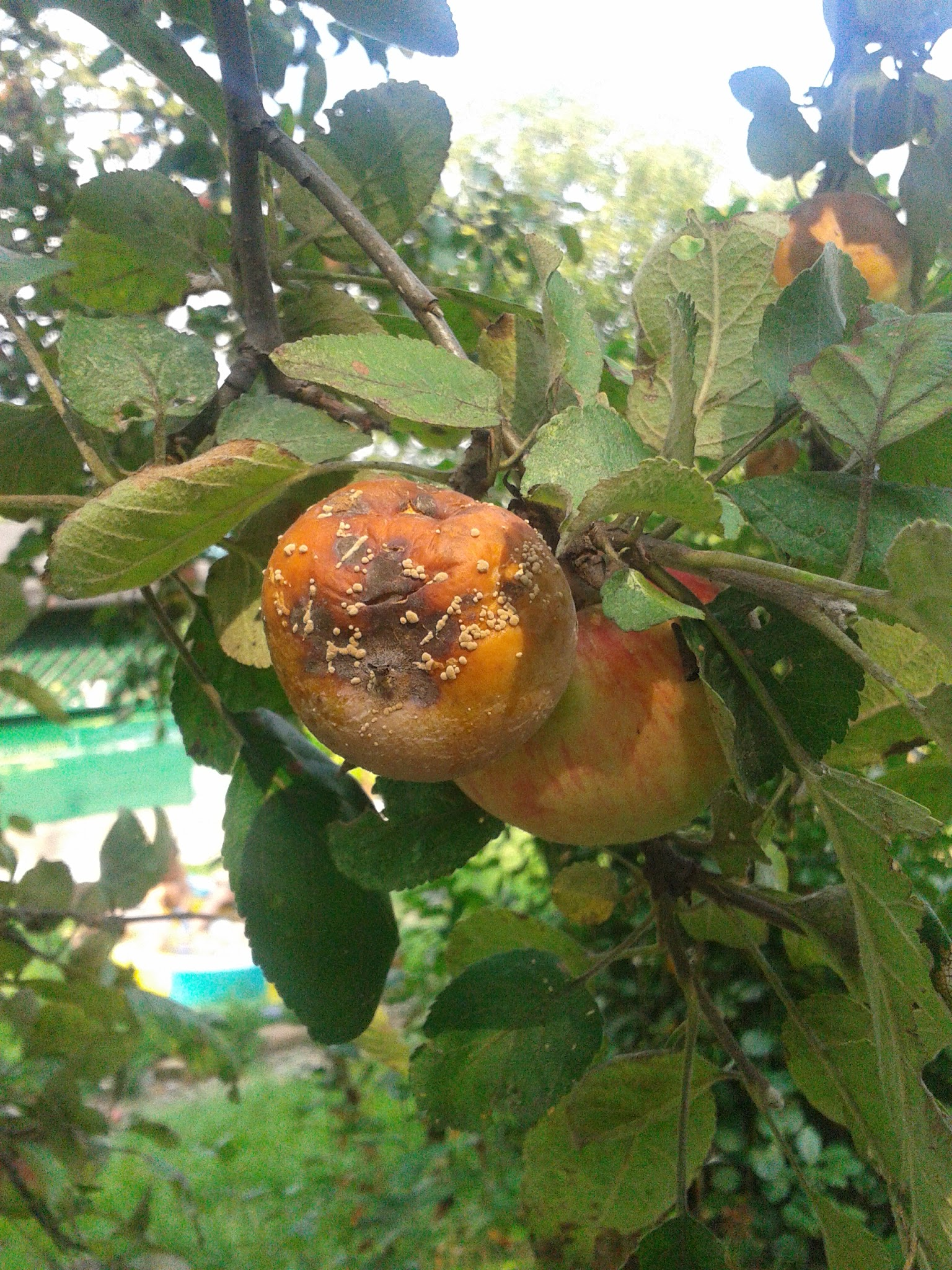
Brown rot fungal disease on an apple. Brown rot typically target a variety of top-fruits.

Fungi are another major pathogen type for plants. They can cause a wide variety of issues such as shorter plant height, growths or pits on tree trunks, root or seed rot, and leaf spots. Common and serious plant fungi include the rice blast fungus, Dutch elm disease, chestnut blight and the black knot and brown rot diseases of cherries, plums, and peaches. It is estimated that pathogenic fungi alone cause up to a 65% reduction in crop yield.

Overall, plants have a wide array of pathogens and it has been estimated that only 3% of the disease caused by plant pathogens can be managed.

=== Animals ===
Animals often get infected with many of the same or similar pathogens as humans including prions, viruses, bacteria, and fungi. While wild animals often get illnesses, the larger danger is for livestock animals. It is estimated that in rural settings, 90% or more of livestock deaths can be attributed to pathogens. Animal transmissible spongiform encephalopathy (TSEs) involving prions include bovine spongiform encephalopathy (mad cow disease), chronic wasting disease, scrapie, transmissible mink encephalopathy, feline spongiform encephalopathy, and ungulate spongiform encephalopathy. Other animal diseases include a variety of immunodeficiency disorders caused by viruses related to human immunodeficiency virus (HIV), such as BIV and FIV.

=== Humans ===
Humans can be infected with many types of pathogens, including prions, viruses, bacteria, and fungi, causing symptoms like sneezing, coughing, fever, vomiting, and potentially lethal organ failure. While some symptoms are caused by the pathogenic infection, others are caused by the immune system's efforts to kill the pathogen, such as feverishly high body temperatures meant to denature pathogenic cells.

== Treatment ==
=== Prions ===
Despite many attempts, no therapy has been shown to halt the progression of prion diseases.

=== Viruses ===
A variety of prevention and treatment options exist for some viral pathogens. Vaccines are one common and effective preventive measure against a variety of viral pathogens. Vaccines prime the immune system of the host, so that when the potential host encounters the virus in the wild, the immune system can defend against infection quickly. Vaccines designed against viruses include annual influenza vaccines and the two-dose MMR vaccine against measles, mumps, and rubella. Vaccines are not available against the viruses responsible for HIV/AIDS, dengue, and chikungunya.

Treatment of viral infections often involves treating the symptoms of the infection, rather than providing medication to combat the viral pathogen itself. Treating the symptoms of a viral infection gives the host immune system time to develop antibodies against the viral pathogen. However, for HIV, highly active antiretroviral therapy (HAART) is conducted to prevent the viral disease from progressing into AIDS as immune cells are lost.

=== Bacteria ===
A structure of Doxycycline a tetracycline-class antibiotic

Much like viral pathogens, infection by certain bacterial pathogens can be prevented via vaccines. Vaccines against bacterial pathogens include the anthrax vaccine and pneumococcal vaccine. Many other bacterial pathogens lack vaccines as a preventive measure, but infection by these bacteria can often be treated or prevented with antibiotics. Common antibiotics include amoxicillin, ciprofloxacin, and doxycycline. Each antibiotic has different bacteria that it is effective against and has different mechanisms to kill that bacteria. For example, doxycycline inhibits the synthesis of new proteins in both gram-negative and gram-positive bacteria, which makes it a broad-spectrum antibiotic capable of killing most bacterial species.

Due to misuse of antibiotics, such as prematurely ended prescriptions exposing bacteria to evolutionary pressure under sublethal doses, some bacterial pathogens have developed antibiotic resistance. For example, a genetically distinct strain of Staphylococcus aureus called MRSA is resistant to the commonly prescribed beta-lactam antibiotics. A 2013 report from the Centers for Disease Control and Prevention (CDC) estimated that in the United States, at least 2 million people get an antibiotic-resistant bacterial infection annually, with at least 23,000 of those patients dying from the infection.

Due to their indispensability in combating bacteria, new antibiotics are required for medical care. One target for new antimicrobial medications involves inhibiting DNA methyltransferases, as these proteins control the levels of expression for other genes, such as those encoding virulence factors.

=== Fungi ===
Infection by fungal pathogens is treated with anti-fungal medication. Athlete's foot, jock itch, and ringworm are fungal skin infections that are treated with topical anti-fungal medications like clotrimazole. Infections involving the yeast species Candida albicans cause oral thrush and vaginal yeast infections. These internal infections can either be treated with anti-fungal creams or with oral medication. Common anti-fungal drugs for internal infections include the echinocandin family of drugs and fluconazole.

=== Algae ===
While algae are commonly not thought of as pathogens, the genus Prototheca causes disease in humans. Treatment for protothecosis is currently under investigation, and there is no consistency in clinical treatment.

== Sexual interactions ==
Many pathogens are capable of sexual interaction. Among pathogenic bacteria, sexual interaction occurs between cells of the same species by the process of genetic transformation. Transformation involves the transfer of DNA from a donor cell to a recipient cell and the integration of the donor DNA into the recipient genome through genetic recombination. The bacterial pathogens Helicobacter pylori, Haemophilus influenzae, Legionella pneumophila, Neisseria gonorrhoeae, and Streptococcus pneumoniae frequently undergo transformation to modify their genome for additional traits and evasion of host immune cells.

Eukaryotic pathogens are often capable of sexual interaction by a process involving meiosis and fertilization. Meiosis involves the intimate pairing of homologous chromosomes and recombination between them. Examples of eukaryotic pathogens capable of sex include the protozoan parasites Plasmodium falciparum, Toxoplasma gondii, Trypanosoma brucei, Giardia intestinalis, and the fungi Aspergillus fumigatus, Candida albicans and Cryptococcus neoformans.

Viruses may also undergo sexual interaction when two or more viral genomes enter the same host cell. This process involves pairing of homologous genomes and recombination between them by a process referred to as multiplicity reactivation. The herpes simplex virus, human immunodeficiency virus, and vaccinia virus undergo this form of sexual interaction.

These processes of sexual recombination between homologous genomes supports repairs to genetic damage caused by environmental stressors and host immune systems.

== See also ==
- Antigenic escape
- Ecological competence
- Emerging Pathogens Institute
- Germ theory of disease
- Human pathogen
- Pathogen-Host Interaction Database (PHI-base)
