= Friedrich Wilhelm Zopf =

German botanist and mycologist

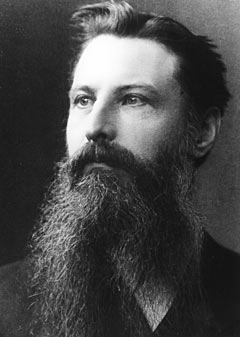
- Born: 12 December 12 1846
- Died: 24 June 1909 (aged 63)
- Scientific career
- Fields: Botany and Mycology

Friedrich (or Friederich) Wilhelm Zopf (12 December 1846 – 24 June 1909) was a German botanist and mycologist. He dedicated his career to fungal biology, particularly to classification of fungi and dye production of fungi and lichens. His 1890 textbook on fungi called “Die Pilze in morphologischer, physiologischer, biologischer und systematischer Beziehung (Translation: The mushrooms in morphological, physiological, biological and systematic relationship)” was an influential work in the field of mycology for many decades. The unicellular achlorophic microalgae Prototheca zopfii is named after him because of his contributions to Krüger's pioneering work in Prototheca.

== Early life ==
Wilhelm Zopf was born in Roßleben in Thuringia in 1846. Before going into biological science area, he has been an elementary school teacher in Thondorf at Mansfeld when he was 21-year-old.

== Education and research career ==
In 1874, Wilhelm Zopf decided to leave his teaching position and turned to studying natural sciences at the University of Berlin.

Also in 1874, Gottlob Ludwig Rabenhorst published Zopfia, which is a genus of fungi in the family Zopfiaceae and was named after Wilhelm Zopf.

He then received his PhD with a dissertation entitled “Die Conidienfrüchte von Fumago (Translation: Conidia of Fumago)” at the University of Halle in 1878.

As Wilhelm Zopf obtained his degree, simultaneously, he also went back to Berlin as an adjunct professor teaching at the Agricultural College for a few years. At that time, in 1880, he issued the exsiccata Mycotheca Marchica with Paul Sydow as co-editor. In 1883, he was invited to be a head of the cryptogamic laboratory at the University of Halle. In the period of 1883 to 1899, he made extensive studies on Chytridiales and other small aquatic fungi parasitic in algae and small animals. Likewise, he also published an authoritative fungal textbook in which he followed a classification similar in part to that of Julius Oscar Brefeld but placed Ascomycetes last in 1890. In this group, he made them went from the simple forms, like Saccharomyces, Endomyces, Gymnoascaceae, to Pezizales. In addition, he recognized the formation of ascogonia in many ascomycetes and even the union of these in Pyronema, with club-shaped “pollinodia”, but expressed doubt as to their real sexual function.

In 1884, Heinrich Georg Winter published Zopfiella which is a genus of fungi within the Lasiosphaeriaceae family and also named in Zopf's honour.

In 1899, Wilhelm Zopf became a professor and a director of the botanical garden at the University of Münster. He continued the research on fungal biology and systematics. During his work on fungal biology, he became more interested in secondary chemistry of these organisms, particularly the lichens. He published on more general problems related to lichen biology, particularly in the genus Cladonia. He died in Münster in 1909, and his name was further commemorated by Edvard Vainio in the naming of Cladonia zopfii (a species of lichen) in 1919.

Lastly, Wilhelm Kirschstein in 1939 published Zopfinula (another genus of fungi).

== Other scientific contributions ==
Wilhelm Zopf was the first to carry out experiments on the chemical differences in lichens. In 1907, his book “Die Flechtenstoffe in chemischer, botanischer, pharmakologischer und technischer Beziehung (Translation: The lichen substances in chemical, botanical, pharmacological and technical relationship)” was published. This book contained descriptions of over 150 chemical compounds found in lichens. Little was known about the actual structures of many of those compounds, but his work gave a sounder basis for the use of chemistry in the taxonomy of lichens.

Although nematode-trapping fungus have been known since 1839, its predatory habit was first observed by Wilhelm Zopf as well. This recorded observation of Arthrobotrys oligospora’s behavior was attributed to him in 1888. This kind of fungi actively captures small worms, generally classified as nematodes or roundworms.

== Selected publications ==
- Zopf, W. 1890: Die pilze in morphologischer, physiologischer, biologischer und systematischer Beziehung. Jena: E. Trewendt. 500 pp.
- Zopf, W. 1897: Zur Kenntniss der Flechtenstoffe (Vierte Mittheilung). Liebigs Annalen der Chemie 297: 271–312.
- Zopf, W. 1905: Biologische und morphologische Beobachtungen an Flechten. I. Berichte der Deutschen Botanischen Gesellschaft 23: 497–504.
- Zopf, W. 1906: Biologische und morphologische Beobachtungen an Flechten. II. 1. Über Ramalina kullensis n. sp. Berichte der Deutschen Botanischen Gesellschaft 24: 574 –580.
- Zopf, W. 1907: Die Flechtenstoffe in chemischer, botanischer, pharmakologischer und technischer Beziehung. Jena: G. Fischer. 450 pp.
- Zopf, W. 1908: Beiträge zu einer chemischen Monographie der Cladoniaceen. Berichte der Deutschen Botanischen Gesellschaft 26: 51–113.

== See also ==
- Category:Taxa named by Friedrich Wilhelm Zopf
