= Prototheca cutis =

Scientific classification
- Kingdom: Plantae
- Division: Chlorophyta
- Class: Trebouxiophyceae
- Order: Chlorellales
- Family: Chlorellaceae
- Genus: Prototheca
- Species: P. cutis

Binomial name
- Prototheca cutis Satoh et al., 2010

Species of algae

Prototheca cutis is a species of achlorophyllic green alga in the genus Prototheca. It is an opportunistic pathogen that causes cutaneous infections in humans and has also been reported in animals. The species was first described in 2010 after its isolation from chronic dermatitis in an immunosuppressed patient in Japan.

== Description ==
Prototheca cutis is a non-photosynthetic (achlorophyllic) green alga that forms white to ivory, smooth colonies on Sabouraud dextrose agar. Vegetative cells are ovoid and measure 2-8 μm in diameter. Reproduction occurs through formation of sporangia containing endospores, a characteristic feature of the genus.

The species grows optimally at 28-30 °C, exhibits weak growth at 37 °C, and does not grow at 40 °C.

== Disease ==
=== Humans ===
The species was originally described from a case of ulcerative cellulitis-like dermatitis in an immunosuppressed patient receiving corticosteroid therapy for psoriasis. The infection remained localized to the skin and improved following prolonged itraconazole therapy. Human disease appears to be rare, and P. cutis is considered an opportunistic pathogen causing cutaneous protothecosis. Because commercial identification systems may incorrectly identify the organism as P. wickerhamii, its true incidence is uncertain.

=== Animals ===
In 2021, P. cutis was reported as the cause of severe nasal protothecosis in an 11 year old domestic cat in the United States. The cat developed progressive rhinitis with destructive pyogranulomatous inflammation affecting the nasal planum and turbinates.
