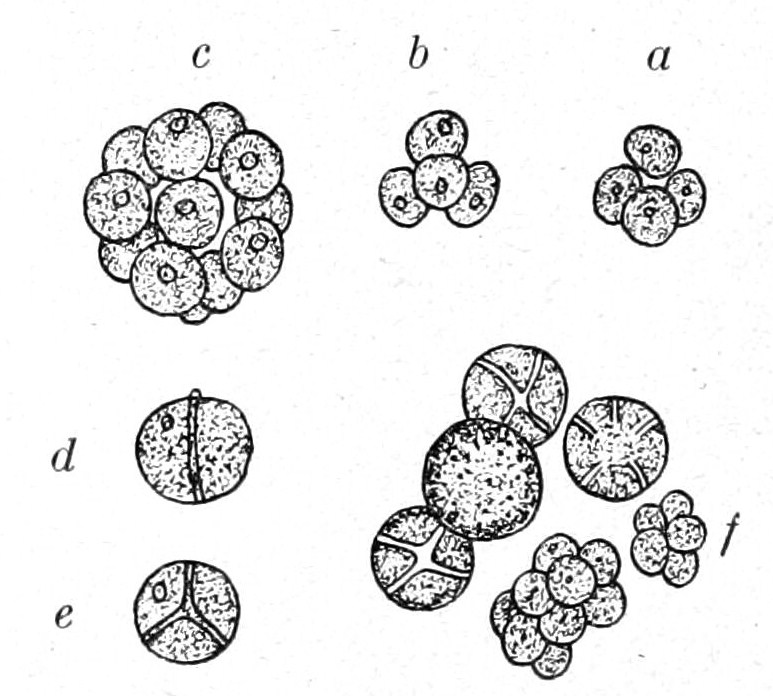

Scientific classification
- Clade: Viridiplantae
- Division: Chlorophyta
- Class: Trebouxiophyceae
- Order: Chlorellales
- Family: Chlorellaceae
- Genus: Chlorella
- Species: C. autotrophica

Binomial name
- Chlorella autotrophica Shihira & R.W.Krauss

= Chlorella autotrophica =

Species of green alga

Chlorella autotrophica, or Chlorella sp. (580), is a species of euryhaline, unicellular microalga in the Division Chlorophyta. It is found in brackish waters and was first isolated in 1956 by Ralph A. Lewin. The species is defined by its inability to use organic carbon as a food source, making the species an obligate autotroph. It is sometimes considered a variety of Chlorella vulgaris.

== Uses ==
C. autotrophica has many uses. The species has been used as a feedstock for rearing bivalves and fry in aquaculture and as source of the amino acid L-Proline. German and Russian scientists investigated the possibility of using the species as a food source for astronauts. The algal species is also a candidate feedstock for biodiesel production due to its ability to accumulate triglycerides under nitrogen limitation.
