= Chlorella volutis =

Scientific classification
- Clade: Viridiplantae
- Division: Chlorophyta
- Class: Trebouxiophyceae
- Order: Chlorellales
- Family: Chlorellaceae
- Genus: Chlorella
- Species: C. volutis

Binomial name
- Chlorella volutis Bock, Krienitz & Pröschold, 2011

Species of green alga

Chlorella volutis is a species of euryhaline, unicellular microalga in the Division Chlorophyta. It is spherical to oval-shaped, is solitary and lacks a mucilaginous envelope.
