= Chlorellosis =

Infectious disease of mammals and fish

Chlorellosis is a disease caused by the infection of Chlorella, a type of microalgae containing large amount of chloroplasts. It is mainly found in sheep and cattle, while cases in humans, dogs, antelopes, beavers, camels and fish, have also reported. Symptoms of Chlorellosis including focal cutaneous lesions, lymphadenitis, and peritonitis.

== See also ==
- Protothecosis
