= Fatty acid photodecarboxylase =

Fatty acid photodecarboxylase (FAP) is an enzyme able to decarboxylate saturated and unsaturated free fatty acids into alkane and alkene respectively (carbon dioxide being the co-product). FAP uses continuous blue light to catalyze decarboxylation, making it a photoenzyme (the third well described). The photoenzyme FAP has been initially discovered in the chloroplast membrane of a microalgae called Chlorella variabilis NC64A; The enzyme was also shown to be well conserved in microalgae in general. Others photoenzymes examples include flavin‐dependent DNA‐repair enzyme and protochlorophyllide oxidoreductases.

== Structure ==
The crystallized structure of FAP shows a hydrophobic tunnel consisting of three domains. The inner FAP binding site is flanked by the domain loops that protect it from interacting with solvent. The C-terminal regulates interactions with other proteins and the N-terminal residues on the helical end stabilizes the neighboring tricyclic ring FAD cofactor.

== Function ==
Flavin adenine dinucleotide (FAD) is found to be responsible for capturing light photons that drive the reaction, with the overall FAP efficiency being dependent on both its enzyme concentration and the light intensity. Experimental studies show photon excited FAD react most favorably under continuous blue light (400-520 nm) which produce carbon dioxide from the hydrolysis of fatty acid chains.

FAP's catalytic activity is proportional to the length of the fatty acid chain due to the number of hydrophobic chains present in the hydrophobic tunnel that stabilize substrates. FAP preference to long-chain fatty acid produces higher turnover rate for hydrocarbons, which can then, in principle, be produced as biofuel as a favored alternative.
