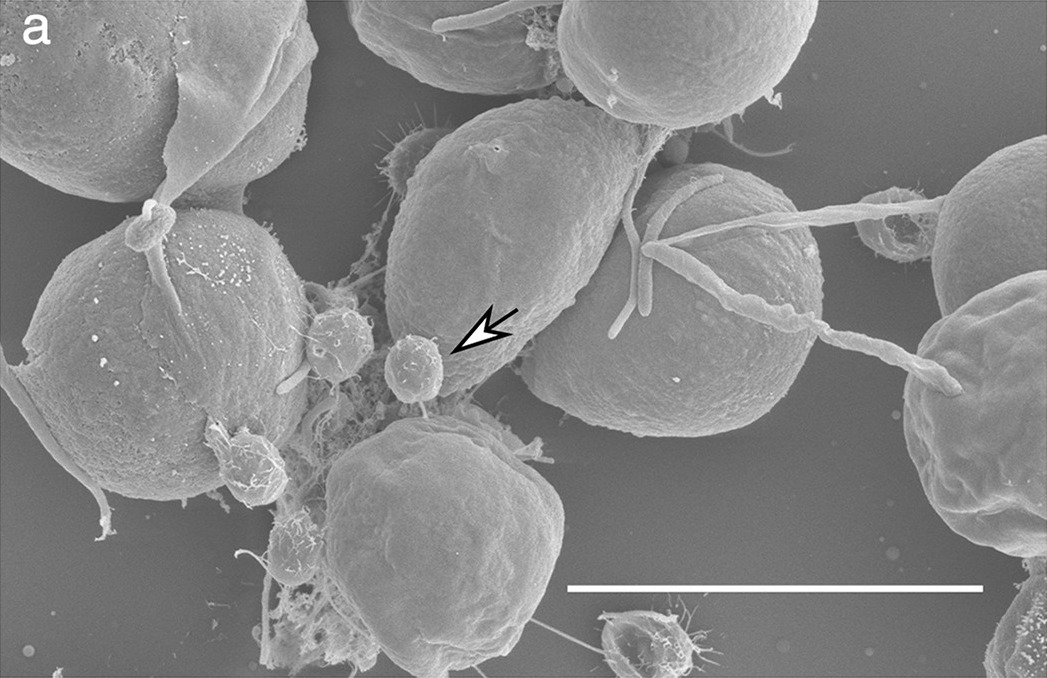
- SEM image of V. chlorellavorus (white arrow) attached to Chlorella sorokiniana. Scale bar 5 μm.

Scientific classification
- Domain: Bacteria
- Kingdom: Bacillati
- Phylum: Cyanobacteriota
- Class: Vampirovibrionophyceae
- Order: Vampirovibrionales; Chuvochina et al. 2024
- Family: Vampirovibrionaceae; Chuvochina et al. 2024
- Genus: Vampirovibrio; Gromov and Mamkayeva 1980
- Species: V. chlorellavorus

Binomial name
- Vampirovibrio chlorellavorus (ex Gromov and Mamkayeva 1972) Gromov and Mamkayeva 1980

Synonyms
- "Bdellovibrio chlorellavorus" Gromov and Mamkayeva 1972

= Vampirovibrio chlorellavorus =

Gram-negative bacteria, algae predator

Vampirovibrio chlorellavorus is a 0.6 μm pleomorphic coccus with a gram negative cell wall, and is one of the few known predatory bacteria. Unlike many bacteria, V. chlorellavorus is an obligate parasite, attaching to the cell wall of green algae of the genus Chlorella. The name Vampirovibrio originates from the Serbian vampir (Cyrillic: вампир). meaning vampire (due to the nature of sucking out cellular contents of its prey) and vibrio referring to the bacterial genus of curved rod bacterium. Chlorellavorus is named for the algal host of the bacterium (Chlorella) and the Latin voro meaning "to devour" (Chlorella-devouring).

== Classification ==
The bacterium, first described by Gromov and Mamkayeva in 1972, was originally classified in the genus Bdellovibrio. It was then reclassified as its own genus Vampirovibrio in 1980 after being excluded from the genus Bdellovibrio for some essential discrepancies. The most significant difference was that members of Bdellovibrio are intracellular parasites, both residing and dividing in the periplasmic space in its host, whereas Vampirovibrio is an extracellular parasite, attaching to the cell wall of green algae in the genus Chlorella. It was also originally thought that the bacterium utilized a flagellum for motility. However, it was later discovered that the bacterium was non-motile, further differentiating it from members of Bdellovibrio.

By analyzing the genome of V. chlorellavorus, Soo and Hugenholtz determined that the organism was more accurately a Cyanobacterium rather than a Proteobacterium. Using 16S rRNA analysis, scientists have estimated that this bacterium most closely belongs to the SM1D11 lineage of bacteria, which has now been classified as the order Vampirovibrionales. Vampirovibrio chlorellavorus was formerly regarded as related to the family Bdellovibrionacae, which has been described as Bdellovibrio and like organisms or BALOs. However, when compared to other Cyanobacteria, Vampirovibrio is non-photosynthetic and seems to belong to Melainabacteria, from Greek root words meaning "nymph of dark waters". It was later decided that phylum Cyanobacteria, class Melainabacteria, order Vampirovibrionales, and family Vampirovibrionaceae more accurately classified the organism.

== Preliminary characterization ==
Vampirovibrio chlorellavorus is a gram-negative obligate aerobic and epibiotic parasitic bacterium with a curved comma shape. The bacterium attaches to the surface of green algae of the genus Chlorella. V. chlorellavorus is an extracellular parasite and remains attached to the cell wall. Once attached to its host, V. chlorellavorus divides by binary fission, destroying its host in the process by "sucking out" all of the cellular contents via peripheral vacuoles much like a vampire (hence the name Vampirovibrio). V. chlorellavorus leaves behind only the cell wall and cytoplasmic membrane of Chromatium along with a few intracytoplasmic inclusions. V. chlorellavorus will not grow in axenic cultures, depending on access to living cells of its preferred algae host, Chlorella vulgaris for reproduction. The Vampirovibrio life cycle consists of: prey location, attachment, ingestion, binary division, and release.

== Discovery and isolation ==
Gromov and Mamkaeva first isolated Bdellovibrio chlorellavorus in a lysis experiment with the algae Chlorella vulgaris from Ukrainian reservoir waters from a mass culture of the algae in 1966. In a later experiment, the scientists were then able to cultivate B. chlorellavorus together with Chlorella vulgaris at 24 °C (75 °F) and pH 6.8 in a liquid agar solution under fluorescent lighting (at an average of 2100 lux).

== Culture status ==
The type strain of bacterium is deposited as a lyophilised co-culture with C. vulgaris in three culture collections (ATCC 29753; NCIB 11383; NCIMB 11383), but all attempts to revive these cultures have failed as of 2015.

Live co-cultures have been established from samples collected in the USA, where this bacterium has greatly disrupted the growth of C. sorokiniana microalgae in outdoor bioreactors.

== Genomics ==
Although the original lyophilized culture of V. chlorellavourus with C. vulgaris from Ukraine (deposited as NCIB 11383) could not be revived, it contained enough DNA. Dr. Hugenholtz and colleagues from the University of Queensland in Australia performed shotgun sequencing of these projects. Subsequently, Soo and Hugenholtz's team reconstructed the genome from the shotgun reads and published their results in 2015. The bacterium's genome consists of 1 circular chromosome and 2 circular plasmids. The Soo team assembled not three whole molecules, but 26 contigs totaling 2.91 Mbp. The GC content was 51.4%.

Soo et al. found that V. chlorellavorus uses a type IV secretion system (T4SS), similar to that of Agrobacterium tumefaciens for host invasion, which is conserved in all three copies of the V. chlorellavorus genome. To locate its prey, V. chlorellavorus seems to be equipped with possible genes for aerotaxis and light activated kinase (moving towards light), suggesting that it might be motile as was originally thought. To digest its algal prey, V. chlorellavorus has over 100 hydrolytic enzymes including proteases and peptidases. In keeping with its description as non-photosynthetic and parasitic microorganism, V. chlorellavorus does not have its own genes for photosynthesis or carbon fixation. V. chlorellavorus is however capable of synthesizing its own nucleotides, certain cofactors and vitamins, and 15 different amino acids. Its bacterial genome also includes coding for a complete glycolysis pathway as well as an electron transport chain.

The genomes for the US bioreactor strains were published in 2020. No plasmids were found in these two strains. Vc_AZ_1 assembled into 11 contigs totaling 2.78 Mbp via metagenome, with 54.8% GC. Vc_AZ_2 assembled into 38 contigs totaling 2.98 Mbp via Hi-C, with 53.0% GC.

GTDB splits RS226 currently-sequenced V. chlorellavorus genomes into four species-sized clusters. V. chlorellavorus includes Soo's type strain sequence. V. chlorellavorus_A includes Vc_AZ_2. V. chlorellavorus_B includes Vc_AZ_1. V. chlorellavorus_D includes a few Swedish samples. Four additional unnamed species-sized clusters were identified in Vampirovibrio.
