= Chlorella rotunda =

Scientific classification
- Kingdom: Plantae
- Division: Chlorophyta
- Class: Trebouxiophyceae
- Order: Chlorellales
- Family: Chlorellaceae
- Genus: Chlorella
- Species: C. rotunda

Binomial name
- Chlorella rotunda Bock, Krienitz & Pröschold, 2011

Species of green alga

Chlorella rotunda is a euryhaline, unicellular microalga in the Division Chlorophyta. It is spherical to oval-shaped, is solitary and lacks a mucilaginous envelope.
