= Chlorella colonialis =

Scientific classification
- Clade: Viridiplantae
- Division: Chlorophyta
- Class: Trebouxiophyceae
- Order: Chlorellales
- Family: Chlorellaceae
- Genus: Chlorella
- Species: C. colonialis

Binomial name
- Chlorella colonialis Bock, Krienitz & Pröschold, 2011

Species of green alga

Chlorella colonialis (also spelled Chlorella coloniales) is a euryhaline, unicellular microalga in the Division Chlorophyta. It is spherical to oval-shaped and is solitary.
