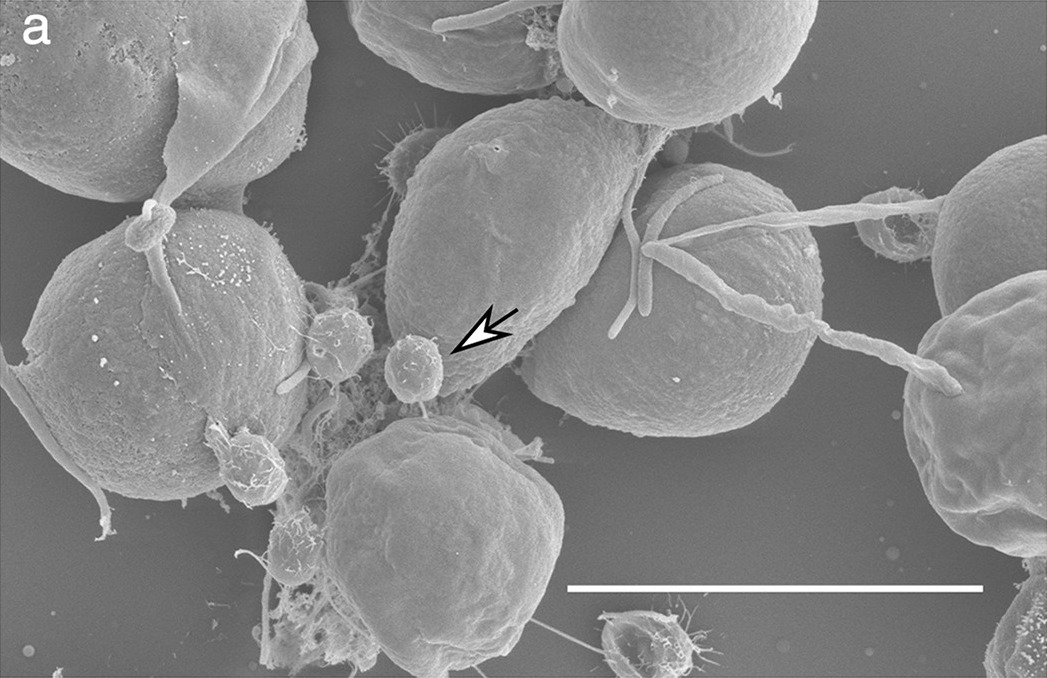
- SEM of Chlorella sorokiniana and attached Vampirovibrio chlorellavorus cells. Scale bar, 5.0 μm.

Scientific classification
- Domain: Bacteria
- Kingdom: Bacillati
- Phylum: Cyanobacteriota
- Class: Vampirovibrionophyceae corrig. Strunecký & Mareš 2023

Orders
- "Ca. Caenarcaniphilales"; "Ca. Gastranaerophilales"; "Ca. Obscuribacterales"; Vampirovibrionales

Synonyms
- "Ca. Melainabacteria" Di Rienzi et al. 2013; "Ca. Melainabacteria" Soo et al. 2014; Vampirovibrionia Chuvochina et al. 2024; Vampirovibriophyceae Strunecký & Mareš 2023

= Vampirovibrionophyceae =

Melainabacteria

Non-photosynthetic class of cyanobacteria

Vampirovibrionophyceae is a class of non-photosynthetic cyanobacteria.

Vampirovibrio chlorellavorus is the only species of the class that has been grown in cell culture. Candidatus species of melainabacteria have been discovered through DNA and RNA sequence analysis of samples from soil, the human gut, and various aquatic habitats such as groundwater. By analyzing genomes of melainabacteria, predictions are possible about their cell structure and metabolic abilities. The deduced structure of the bacterial cell is similar to cyanobacteria in being surrounded by two membranes. It differs from cyanobacteria in its predicted ability to move by flagella (like gram-negative flagella), though some members (e.g. "Candidatus Gastranaerophilales") appear to lack flagella. It is predicted that melainabacteria are not able to perform photosynthesis, but obtain energy by fermentation.

== Treatments ==
Melainabacteria has been treated as:

- The phylum "Candidatus Melainabacteria" when its DNA was discovered in 2013.
- The class "Candidatus Melainabacteria" under Cyanobacteria in Soo et al. (2014).
- The phylum "Candidatus Melainobacteriota", the 2013 name corrected to match new bacteriological rules.
- The class Vampirovibriophyceae under Cyanobacteria in Strunecký and Mareš 2023, with the corrected spelling Vampirovibrionophyceae.
- The class Vampirovibrionia under Cyanobacteria in 2023.

It was not realized until 2015 that this group actually includes one cultured bacterium. Names proposed prior to this point are written under the assumption that they describe an uncultured group and are Candidatus. Names proposed without Candidatus after this point use the cultured species in the description. Removal of the Candidatus prefix does not happen automatically; instead, an author must make a separate valid publication.

Treating this group as a phylum would place it at the same taxonomic rank as Cyanobacteriota.

== Phylogeny ==
16S rRNA based LTP_10_2024

- "Cyanobacteriota"
  - Cyanobacteria
  - "Melainabacteria"
    Vampirovibrio

120 marker proteins based GTDB 10-RS226

- "Cyanobacteriota"
  - "Sericytochromatia"
  - - Cyanobacteria
    - - "Melainabacteria"
        - - "Caenarcanales"
            - "Caenarcanaceae"
              "Ca. Caenarcanum"
          - "Obscuribacterales"
            - "Obscuribacteraceae"
              "Ca. Obscuribacter"
        - - Vampirovibrionales
            - Vampirovibrionaceae
              Vampirovibrio chlorellavorus
          - "Gastranaerophilales"
            - "Adamsellaceae"
              "Ca. Adamsella"
            - "Gastranaerophilaceae"
              - - Ca. Spyradomonas"
                - - Ca. Avigastranaerophilus"
                  - Ca. Limenecus"
              - - "Ca. Galligastranaerophilus"
                - - Ca. Gastranaerophilus"
                  - - Ca. Stercorousia"
                    - - Ca. Scatenecus"
                      - Ca. Scatousia"

== Classification ==
- Class Vampirovibrionophyceae Strunecký and Mareš 2023 (ACD20)
  - Order "Caenarcanales" corrig. Soo et al. 2014 ["Caenarcaniphilales" Soo et al. 2014]
    - Family "Caenarcanaceae" Chuvochina et al. 2023
      - Genus "Ca. Caenarcanum" Soo et al. 2014
        - "Ca. C. bioreactoricola" Soo et al. 2014
  - Order "Obscuribacterales" Soo et al. 2014
    - Family "Obscuribacteraceae" Chuvochina et al. 2023
      - Genus "Ca. Obscuribacter" Soo et al. 2014
        - "Ca. O. phosphatis" Soo et al. 2014
  - Order Vampirovibrionales Chuvochina et al. 2024
    - Family Vampirovibrionaceae Chuvochina et al. 2024
      - Genus Vampirovibrio Gromov & Mamkayeva 1972 ex Gromov & Mamkaeva 1980
        - V. chlorellavorus Gromov & Mamkayeva 1972 ex Gromov & Mamkaeva 1980
  - Order "Gastranaerophilales" Soo et al. 2014
    - Family "Adamsellaceae" Pallen, Rodriguez-R & Alikhan 2022 [CAJFVJ01]
      - Genus "Ca. Adamsella" Glendinning et al. 2020
        - "Ca. A. avium" Glendinning et al. 2020
    - Family "Gastranaerophilaceae" Gilroy et al. 2021
      - Genus "Ca. Avigastranaerophilus" Gilroy et al. 2021
        - "Ca. A. faecigallinarum" Gilroy et al. 2021
      - Genus "Ca. Galligastranaerophilus" Gilroy et al. 2021
        - "Ca. G. faecipullorum" Gilroy et al. 2021
        - "Ca. G. gallistercoris" Gilroy et al. 2021
        - "Ca. G. intestinavium" Gilroy et al. 2021
        - "Ca. G. intestinigallinarum" Gilroy et al. 2021
      - Genus "Ca. Gastranaerophilus" Soo et al. 2014
        - "Ca. G. phascolarctosicola" Soo et al. 2014
        - "Ca. G. termiticola" Utami et al. 2018
      - Genus "Ca. Limenecus" Gilroy et al. 2021
        - "Ca. L. avicola" Gilroy et al. 2021
      - Genus "Ca. Scatenecus" Gilroy et al. 2021
        - "Ca. S. faecavius" Gilroy et al. 2021
      - Genus "Ca. Scatousia" Gilroy et al. 2021
        - "Ca. S. excrementigallinarum" Gilroy et al. 2021
        - "Ca. S. excrementipullorum" Gilroy et al. 2021
      - Genus "Ca. Spyradomonas" Gilroy et al. 2021
        - "Ca. S. excrementavium" Gilroy et al. 2021
      - Genus "Ca. Stercorousia" Gilroy et al. 2021
        - "Ca. S. faecigallinarum" Gilroy et al. 2021

== Ecological niche ==
Melainabacteria nucleic acids can be found in a range of environments, including soil, water, and animal habitats. They can often be found in the gut of humans and in the respiratory tract, oral environments, and skin surface, though rarely. Melainabacteria nucleic acids are often found in natural environments such as groundwater aquifers and lake sediment, soil, and the aphotic zone of aquatic environments such as lake sediment and aquifers. Cyanobacteria bloom in freshwater systems as a result of excess nutrients and high temperatures, resulting in a scum on the water surface that resembles spilled paint. Because melainabacteria is a type of cyanobacteria, it has raised concern because melainabacteria thrive in groundwater systems. The genomes of melainabacteria were found to be bigger when found in aquifer systems and algal cultivation ponds than when in the mammalian gut environment.

== Origin ==
The Great Oxygenation Event (GOE) increased the abundance of oxygen in the atmosphere. Bacteria that existed before the GOE did not rely on oxygen, such as the billion-year-old cyanobacteria. Melainabacteria do not photosynthesize. Cyanobacteria produced atmospheric oxygen and supported the development of early plant cells.

== Genome ==
The genomes of melainabacteria organisms isolated from ground water indicate that the organism has the capacity to fix nitrogen. Melainabacteria are predicted to lack linked electron transport chains, but have multiple methods to generate a membrane potential which can then produce ATP via ATP synthase. They are thought to be able to use Fe hydrogenases for H_{2} production that can be consumed by other microorganisms. Melainabacteria from the human gut also are thought to synthesize several B and K vitamins, which suggests that these bacteria are beneficial to their host because they are consumed along with plant fibers.

== Animal habitats ==
Melainabacteria may play a role in digesting fiber in the human gut, and their nucleic acids are more commonly found in herbivorous mammals and those with plant-rich diets. Because plant diets require more fiber break-down, melainabacteria may aid in this digestive function. However, scientists do not know why these microbes are in the gut and how they got there.

== See also ==
- List of bacteria genera
- List of bacterial orders
