= Chlorella pituita =

Scientific classification
- Clade: Viridiplantae
- Division: Chlorophyta
- Class: Trebouxiophyceae
- Order: Chlorellales
- Family: Chlorellaceae
- Genus: Chlorella
- Species: C. pituita

Binomial name
- Chlorella pituita Bock, Krienitz & Pröschold, 2011

Species of green alga

Chlorella pituita is a species of euryhaline, unicellular microalga in the Division Chlorophyta. It is spherical to oval-shaped and is solitary
