= Cycloartenol 24-C-methyltransferase =

Identifiers
- EC no.: 2.1.1.142

Databases
- IntEnz: IntEnz view
- BRENDA: BRENDA entry
- ExPASy: NiceZyme view
- KEGG: KEGG entry
- MetaCyc: metabolic pathway
- PRIAM: profile
- PDB structures: RCSB PDB PDBe PDBsum
- Gene Ontology: AmiGO / QuickGO
Search
- PMC: articles
- PubMed: articles
- NCBI: proteins

Cycloartenol 24-C-methyltransferase (EC 2.1.1.142) is an enzyme that catalyzes the chemical reaction

cycloartenol
+ SAM
cyclolaudenol
+ SAH

This is a methylation reaction in which the phytosterol, cycloartenol, is converted to cyclolaudenol. The methyl group comes from the cofactor, S-adenosyl methionine (SAM), which becomes S-adenosyl-L-homocysteine (SAH). The enzyme was characterised from the green alga Prototheca wickerhamii.

This enzyme belongs to the family of transferases, specifically those transferring one-carbon group methyltransferases. The systematic name of this enzyme class is S-adenosyl-L-methionine:cycloartenol 24-C-methyltransferase. This enzyme is also called sterol C-methyltransferase.
