= Aquaculture in Timor-Leste =

Aquaculture in Timor-Leste is not a large industry; however, World Vision has expressed an interest in organizing aquaculture development projects in the country in order to help those who suffer food shortages in the upland areas. Research has demonstrated that Timor-Leste has great potential for both fresh- and salt-water aquaculture, including microphyte production.
