= Chlorella miniata =

Scientific classification
- Kingdom: Plantae
- Division: Chlorophyta
- Class: Trebouxiophyceae
- Order: Chlorellales
- Family: Chlorellaceae
- Genus: Chlorella
- Species: C. miniata

Binomial name
- Chlorella miniata (Kützing) Oltmanns, 1904

Synonyms
- Protococcus miniatus Kützing, 1849

Species of alga

Chlorella miniata is a species of green microalga in the family Chlorellaceae. Its name is a Latin adjective meaning bright red as if painted with vermillion. This species has been researched in a preliminary manner for possible algal bioremediation use.
