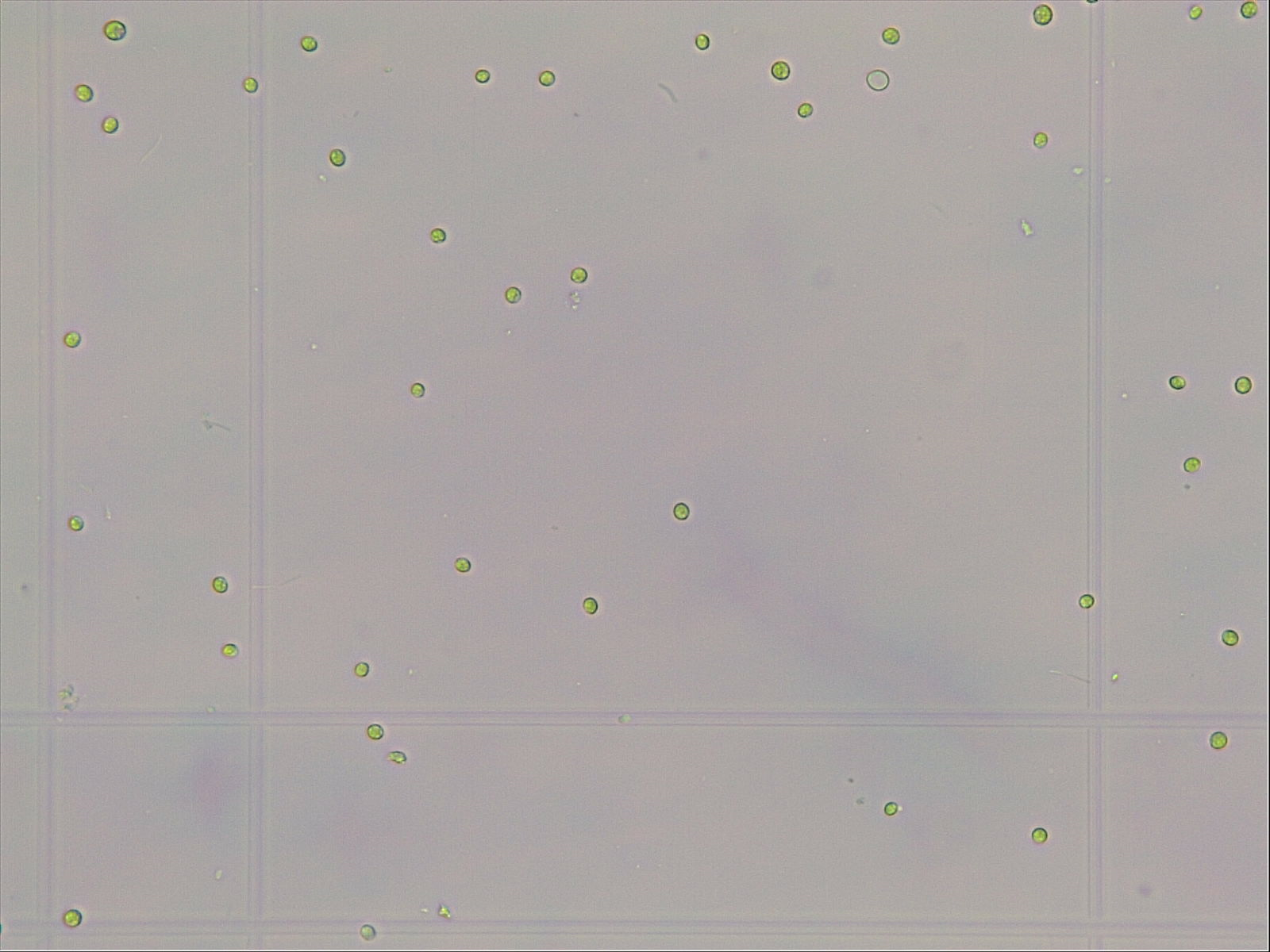
- C. sorokiniana cells 400× magnification

Scientific classification
- Clade: Viridiplantae
- Division: Chlorophyta
- Class: Trebouxiophyceae
- Order: Chlorellales
- Family: Chlorellaceae
- Genus: Chlorella
- Species: C. sorokiniana

Binomial name
- Chlorella sorokiniana Shihira & R.W.Krauss

= Chlorella sorokiniana =

Species of green alga

Chlorella sorokiniana is a species of freshwater green microalga in the division Chlorophyta. The original strain of C. sorokiniana was first isolated by Constantine A. Sorokin in 1951 from a freshwater stream on the University of Texas campus in Austin, Texas; he labeled it as Chlorella pyrenoidosa strain 7-1 1-05. In 1965, Ikuko Shihira and Robert W. Krauss reinvestigated the strain and found it to be its own species, naming it after Sorokin.

Chlorella sorokiniana consists of single, spherical cells that grow up to 5.5 μm in diameter. The chloroplast (chromatophore) inside the cell is single, bowl-shaped and green but often turns white in old cultures. A pyrenoid is present in the chloroplast. Cells grow rapidly on agar without organic nutrients, and grows well on glucose in light and to a lesser extent in darkness. Other sugars such as galactose and mannose may stimulate its growth less or not help it grow at all.

== Uses ==
Chlorella sorokiniana grows rapidly, like the related Chlorella vulgaris, and in particular is able to attain a maximum growth rate of 9.2 doublings per day at 39 °C. Therefore, this microalga has been used extensively as a model system, for example to study enzymes involved in higher plant metabolism. In 1951, the Rockefeller Foundation in collaboration with the Japanese Government and Hiroshi Tamiya developed the technology to grow, harvest and process Chlorella sorokiniana on a large, economically feasible scale. A faster-growing mutant was reported in 2014 and turned out to have smaller antenna complexes.

Chlorella sorokiniana is one candidate for producing biofuel from microalgae. Chlorella sorokiniana is also eaten as a food supplement. It effectively extracts nutrients (phosphorus, nitrogen) and heavy metals from waste water. With relatively low-heavy-metal wastewater, it provides a way to recover these plant nutrients into useful biomass.

Growth of Chlorella sorokiniana in bioreactors can be threatened by Vampirovibrio chlorellavorus, a bacterial predator of Chlorella.
