= Protothecosis =

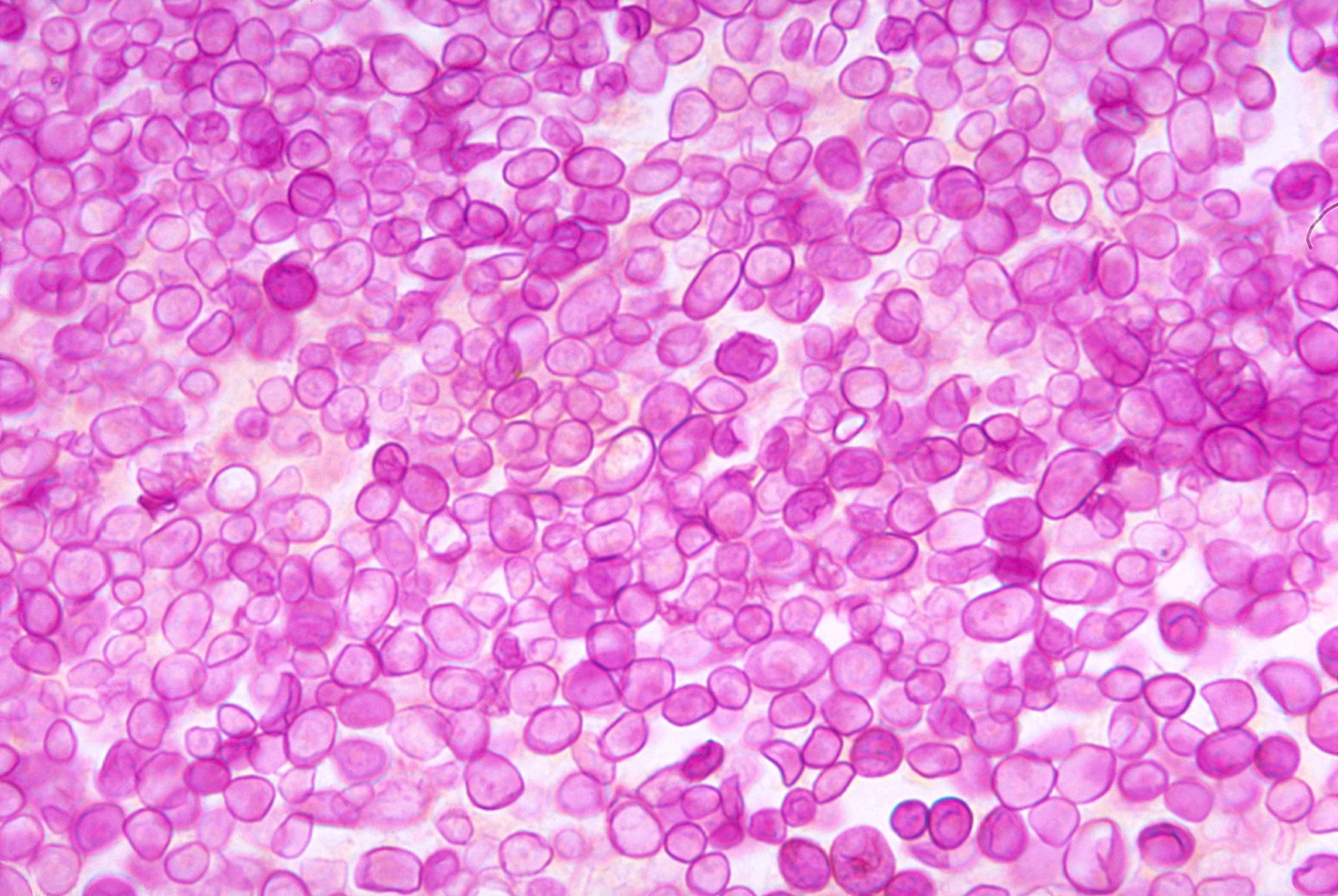
- Histologic stain of a Prototheca zopfii infection in a dog
- Specialty: Infectious diseases

Protothecosis, otherwise known as Algaemia, is a disease found in dogs, cats, cattle, and humans caused by a type of green alga known as Prototheca that lacks chlorophyll and enters the human or animal bloodstream. It and its close relative Helicosporidium are unusual in that they are actually green algae that have become parasites. The two most common species are Prototheca wickerhamii and Prototheca zopfii. Both are known to cause disease in dogs, while most human cases are caused by P. wickerhami. Prototheca is found worldwide in sewage and soil. Infection is rare despite high exposure, and may be related to a defective immune system. In dogs, female collies are most commonly affected.

The first human case was identified in 1964 in Sierra Leone.

== Cause ==
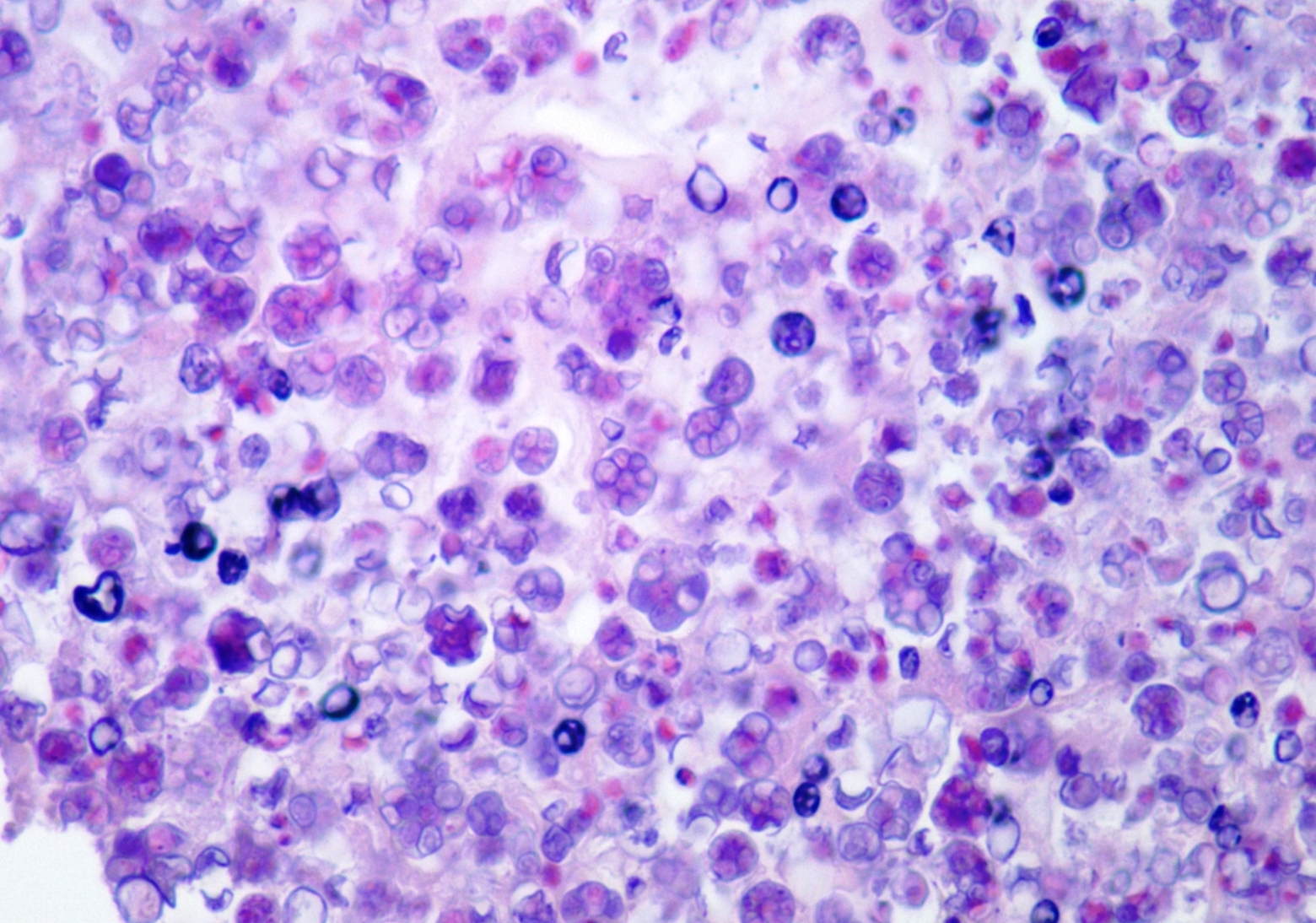
Photomicrograph of Prototheca wickerhamii infection in a human. Note the floret-like arrangements. Hematoxylin and eosin stain.

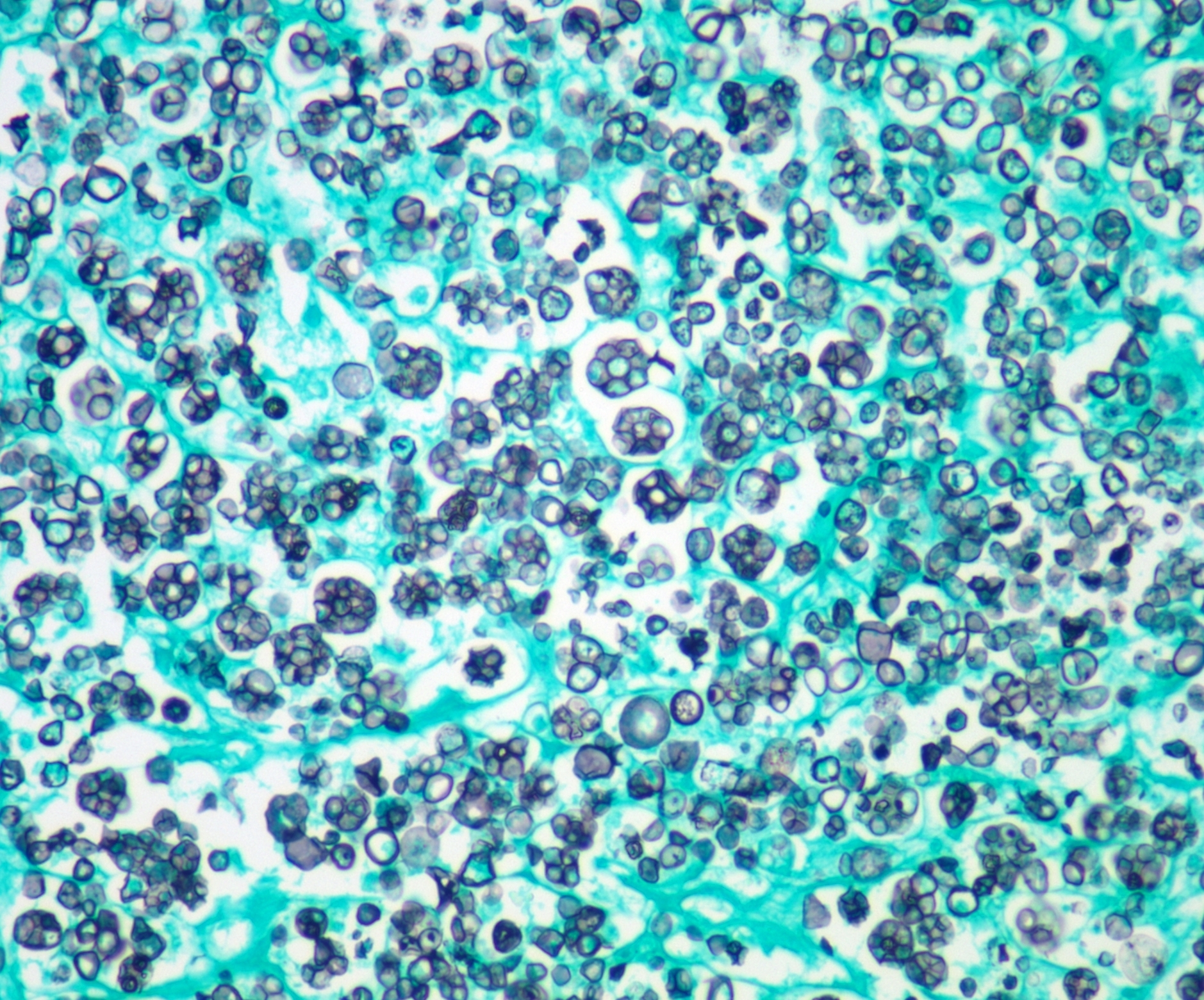
Photomicrograph of Prototheca wickerhamii infection in a human. Note the floret-like arrangements. Gomori methenamine silver (GMS) stain.

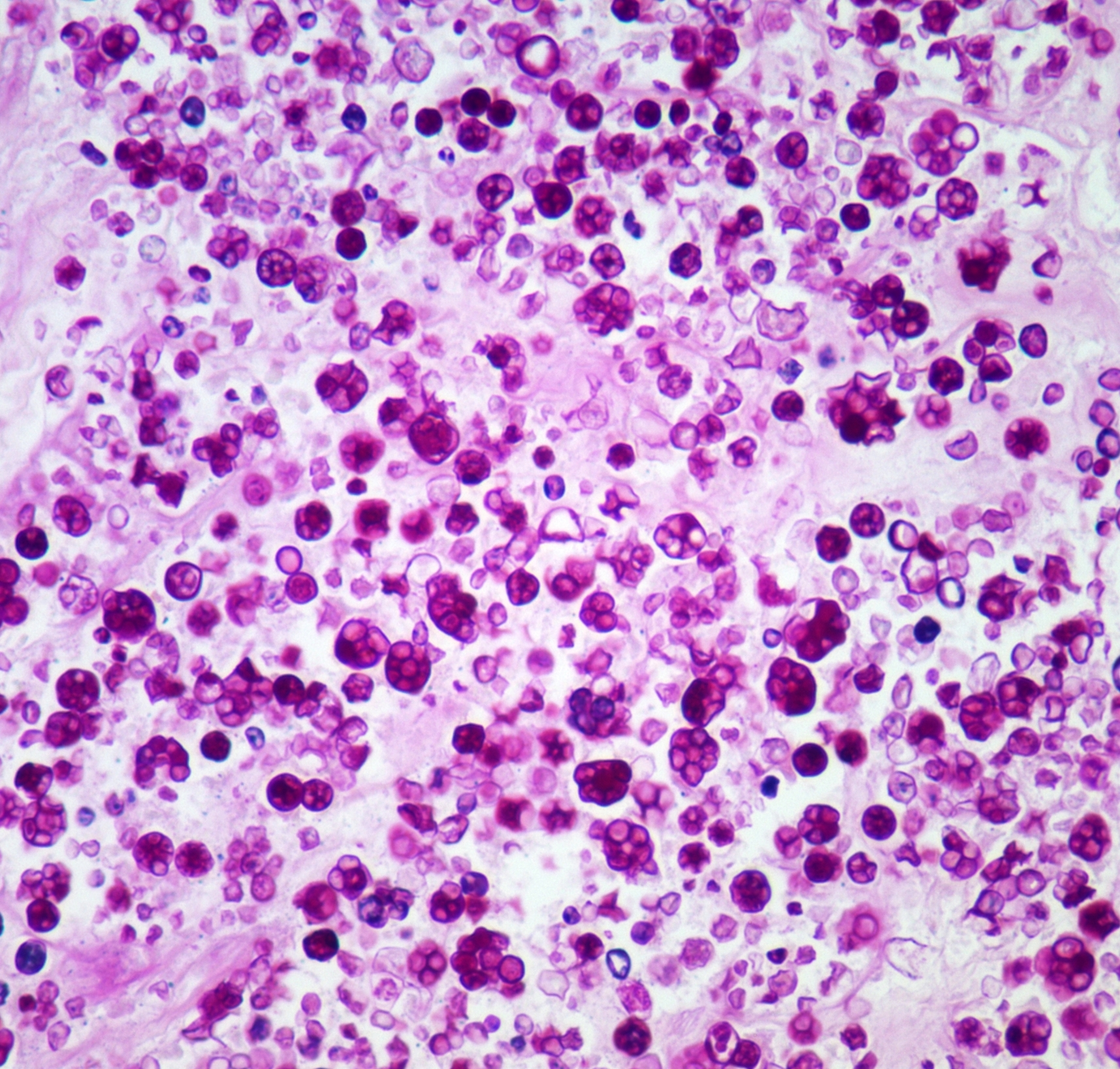
Photomicrograph of Prototheca wickerhamii infection in a human. Note the floret-like arrangements. Periodic acid-Schiff (PAS) stain.

Prototheca has been thought to be a mutant of Chlorella, a type of single-celled green alga. However, while Chlorella contains galactose and galactosamine in the cell wall, Prototheca lacks these. Also, Chlorella obtains its energy through photosynthesis, while Prototheca is saprotrophic, feeding on dead and decaying organic matter. When Prototheca was first isolated from slime flux of trees in 1894, it was thought to be a type of fungus. Its size varies from 2 to 15 micrometres.

== Treatment ==
Treatment with amphotericin B has been reported.

== In cattle ==
Cattle can be affected by protothecal enteritis and mastitis. Protothecal mastitis occurs worldwide, although most cases of have been reported from Germany, the United States, and Brazil.

== In dogs ==
Disseminated protothecosis is most commonly seen in dogs. The algae enters the body through the mouth or nose and causes infection in the intestines. From there it can spread to the eye, brain, and kidneys. Symptoms can include diarrhea, weight loss, weakness, inflammation of the eye (uveitis), retinal detachment, ataxia, and seizures.

Dogs with acute blindness and diarrhea that develop exudative retinal detachment should be assessed for protothecosis. Diagnosis is through culture or finding the organism in a biopsy, cerebrospinal fluid, vitreous humour, or urine. Treatment of the disseminated form in dogs is very difficult, although use of antifungal medication has been successful in a few cases. Prognosis for cutaneous protothecosis is guarded and depends on the surgical options. Prognosis for the disseminated form is grave. This may be due to delayed recognition and treatment.

== See also ==
- Progressive disseminated histoplasmosis
- List of cutaneous conditions
- Chlorellosis
