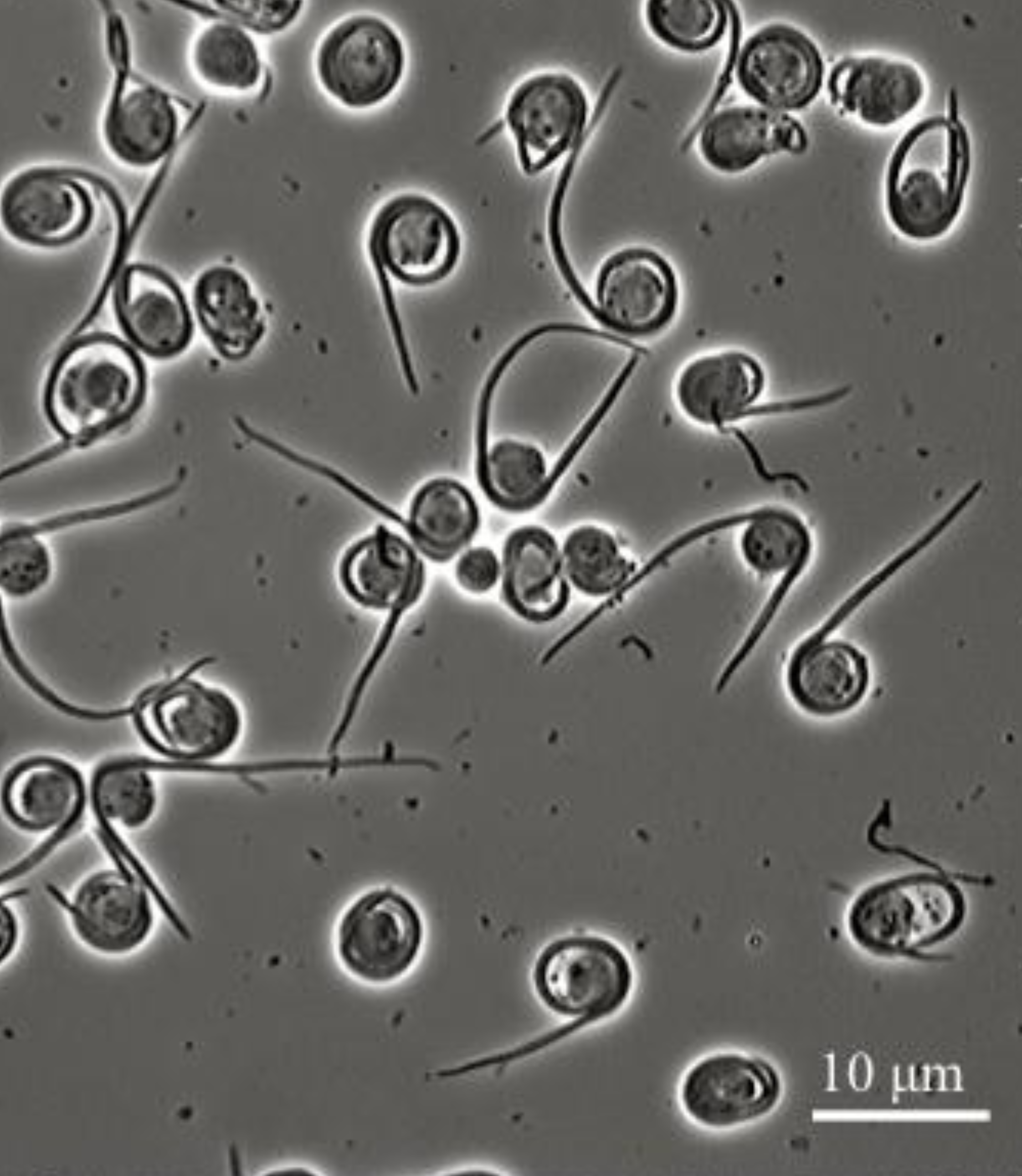
- Helicosporidium under a light microscope

Scientific classification
- Kingdom: Plantae
- Division: Chlorophyta
- Class: Trebouxiophyceae
- Order: Chlorellales
- Family: Chlorellaceae
- Genus: Helicosporidium; Keilin, 1921

Species
- Helicosporidium sp. ex Simulium jonesii; Helicosporidium sp. ex Cyrtobagous salviniae

= Helicosporidium =

Genus of algae

Helicosporidium is a genus of colorless, pathogenic algae in the class Trebouxiophyceae of the green algae. It is a parasite found in the gut of insects, and a close relative of Prototheca.

== History of knowledge ==
The genus Helicosporidium was first described in England by David Keilin in 1921. He isolated the parasite from the ceratopogonid fly Dasyhelea obscura, and named the species Helicosporidium parasiticum. In 1931, the genus and species names were validated, it was placed in its own order Helicosporidia. In 1970, Helicosporidium was discovered from Argentina infecting a lepidopteran. Helicosporidium infections, although rare, have been discovered around the world and in a diverse range of host organisms.

The unique morphology of Helicosporidium has made it easy to identify, but difficult to classify. Helicosporidium has at various points been considered to be a protozoan or an ascomycete fungus. It was not until molecular phylogenetics demonstrated that Helicosporidium was a relative of the green algae that had lost its plastids and thus the ability to perform photosynthesis. It is closely related and similar to Prototheca, another non-photosynthetic genus that is parasitic.

== Biology ==
The key morphological feature of Helicosporidium is the presence of four-celled structures, termed cysts (also known as spores in the older literature). The cyst is barrel-shaped and contains three ovoid cells (called sporoplasms) stacked on each other, as well as a fourth cell which is elongated and filamentous; the fourth cell wraps around the other three.

=== Life cycle ===
Invertebrates become infected with Helicosporidium after ingestion, less commonly by wounds in their cuticle. After entering the body, the cysts enter the gut lumen and undergo dehiscence, wherein the cysts split open and release the sporoplasms and filamentous cells.

The sporoplasms develop into elongated cells, about 11.5 μm long, which divide to form four spherical vegetative cells. Vegetative cells of Helicosporidium are characterized by the production of two, four or eight daughter cells in an outer wall (also known as a pellicle), and may undergo this cycle (termed autosporulation) a number of times. After about 3 to 6 days, the vegetative cells develop into cysts, secrete an outer spore wall (or pellicle), and differentiate into the three sporoplasms and filamentous cell.

=== Hosts ===
Helicosporidium is currently the only known genus of algae that infects insects (other algae such as Coccomyxa infect invertebrates such as mussels and starfish). Helicosporidium is known to infect insects in three orders: Diptera, Coleoptera, and Lepidoptera, but does not appear to be able to infect orthopterans and hymenopterans. Isolates of Helicosporidium are able to be horizontally transferred; for examples, isolates from dipterans can easily infect coleopterans and lepidopterans, and vice versa. It can also infect mites and collembolans, and has been detected in trematodes and cladocerans.

== Genome ==
=== Plastids ===
Despite not performing photosynthesis, Helicosporidium retains vestigial plastid-like organelles. The plastid has not been directly observed in ultra-thin sections, but its whole genome has been sequenced. The plastid genome is very small (about 37.5 kilo-base pairs long); it lacks all genes that code for proteins that function in photosynthesis, but also has very little non-coding DNA. Its 16S rRNA sequences are similar to those of Prototheca, and cluster with it in phylogenetic analyses. The overall structure of its genome is somewhat similar to those of apicomplexan parasites.

=== Mitochondria ===
The mitochondrial genome of Helicosporidium is highly similar to that of Prototheca. However, its introns are very unusual in that their group I introns are trans-spliced, and contain two open reading frames which may be degenerate maturase/endonuclease genes.
