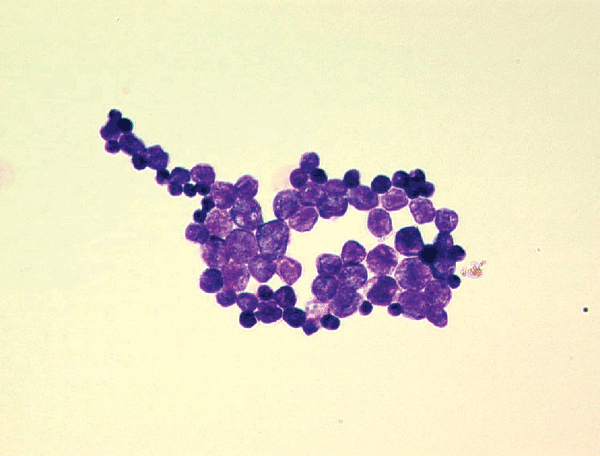
- Prototheca wickerhamii, with Gram stain

Scientific classification
- Domain: Eukaryota
- Clade: Archaeplastida
- Clade: Viridiplantae
- Division: Chlorophyta
- Class: Trebouxiophyceae
- Order: Chlorellales
- Family: Chlorellaceae
- Genus: Prototheca; Krüger, 1894

Species
- Prototheca blaschkeae; Prototheca bovis; Prototheca cerasi; Prototheca ciferrii; Prototheca cookei; Prototheca cutis; Prototheca miyajii; Prototheca moriformis; Prototheca pringsheimii; Prototheca stagnora; Prototheca tumulicola; Prototheca wickerhamii; Prototheca xanthoriae; Prototheca zopfii

= Prototheca =

Genus of algae

Prototheca is a genus of algae in the family Chlorellaceae. While this genus is a green algae, their plastids no longer have chlorophyll and therefore their photosynthetic ability have been lost. Some species can cause protothecosis in humans and various vertebrates.

== Etymology ==
From the Greek proto- (first) + thēkē (sheath), Prototheca is a genus of variably shaped spherical cells of achloric algae in the family Chlorellaceae. Wilhelm Krüger, a German expert in plant physiology and sugar production, reported Prototheca microorganisms in 1894, shortly after spending 7 years in Java studying sugarcane. He isolated Prototheca species from the sap of 3 tree species. Krüger named these organisms as P. moriformis and P. zopfii, the second name as a tribute to Friedrich Wilhelm Zopf, a renowned botanist, mycologist, and lichenologist.

== Biology ==
Prototheca consists of microscopic, single cells, which may sometimes be clustered to form irregular packets. The cell is generally spherical, ellipsoidal or reniform in shape, with a thin and delicate cell wall. Chloroplasts are absent.

With the lack of chloroplasts and photosynthetic ability, Prototheca grow heterotrophically and some exhibit parasitism. Other groups of photosynthetic organisms have undergone similar functional losses in photosynthetic ability and shifted to a parasitic lifestyle, such as in apicomplexans.

== Evolution and taxonomy ==
Although Prototheca lack chloroplasts, they were recognized early on as closely related to other Chlorellaceae based on other morphological and physiological traits similar to the group. Phylogenetics confirm that Prototheca species are closely related to Chlorella and other genera, although it is not yet clear whether Prototheca is a monophyletic group.

== Pathogenicity ==
Some species in the genus Prototheca are known to cause protothecosis, one of the few researched diseases caused by algae, which are categorized as algaemia. P. wickerhamii is the main causing agent of protothecosis in humans, and was first identified as such in 1964. A strain of P. bovis (formerly classified under P. zopfii) is known to cause this disease in cattle, dogs, buffalo, and horses.

Symptoms include: Cutaneous lesions, Olecranon bursitis.
