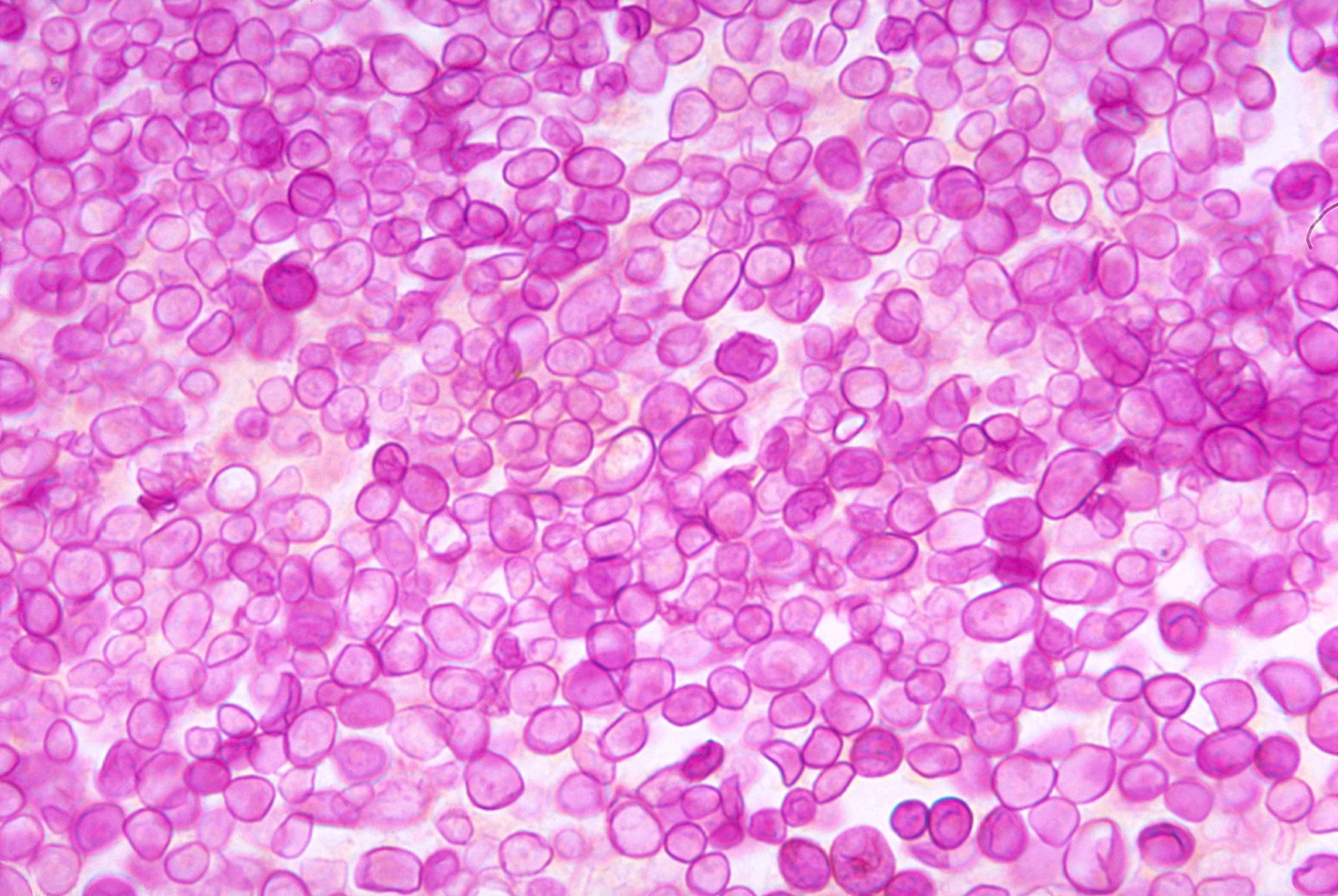
- Photomicrograph depicting the histopathology associated with protothecosis in a dog due to Prototheca zopfii

Scientific classification
- Domain: Eukaryota
- Supergroup: Archaeplastida
- Clade: Viridiplantae
- Division: Chlorophyta
- Class: Trebouxiophyceae
- Order: Chlorellales
- Family: Chlorellaceae
- Genus: Prototheca
- Species: P. zopfii

Binomial name
- Prototheca zopfii W.Krüger

= Prototheca zopfii =

Species of alga

Prototheca zopfii is a ubiquitous achlorophyllic (without chlorophyll) green alga. It is a known cause of mastitis in cattle.

== Taxonomy ==
The genome of this organism's mitochondrion and plastid were first sequenced in 2018. Polymerase chain reaction and restriction fragment length polymorphism analysis are useful tool for rapid confirmative diagnosis.

== Biology ==
Prototheca zopfii is ubiquitous in nature, but mainly associated with wet areas and places with high amounts of organic matter. It can be found in tanks, well water, teat-dip containers, and milking machines.

Prototheca zopfii grows in aerobic conditions and reproduce asexually by endosporulation. Sabouraud agar is used as a cultural medium.

== Pathogenicity ==
Prototheca zopfii is an opportunistic environmental pathogen. The species can infect man and animal, causing mastitis. P. zopfii can cause bovine clinical mastitis in high milk-yielding cows. Genotypes I and III, traditionally, are thought not to be involved in the pathogenicity of mastitis and to be pollutants of milk, whereas genotype II is believed the main cause of mastitis. However, in 2017, three cases of human protothecosis due to P. zopfii genotype I have been reported in China.

== Outbreaks ==
Bovine mastitis outbreaks by P. zopfii is a global problem. It is reported from Europe, Asia, North America, and South America.

== Antimicrobial therapy ==
Prototheca zopfii is less susceptible or completely resistant to clotrimazole, fluconazole, econazole, flucytosine, cefoperazone, cephalexin, enrofloxacin, lincomycin, oxytetracycline, miconazole, colistin, a combination of amoxicillin with clavulanic acid, enrofloxacin, amoxicillin, tetracycline, penicillin, lincomycin, and novobiocin, whereas drugs such as nystatin, ketoconazole, and amphotericin B are effective against algae isolated from milk of mastitis-affected cows.
