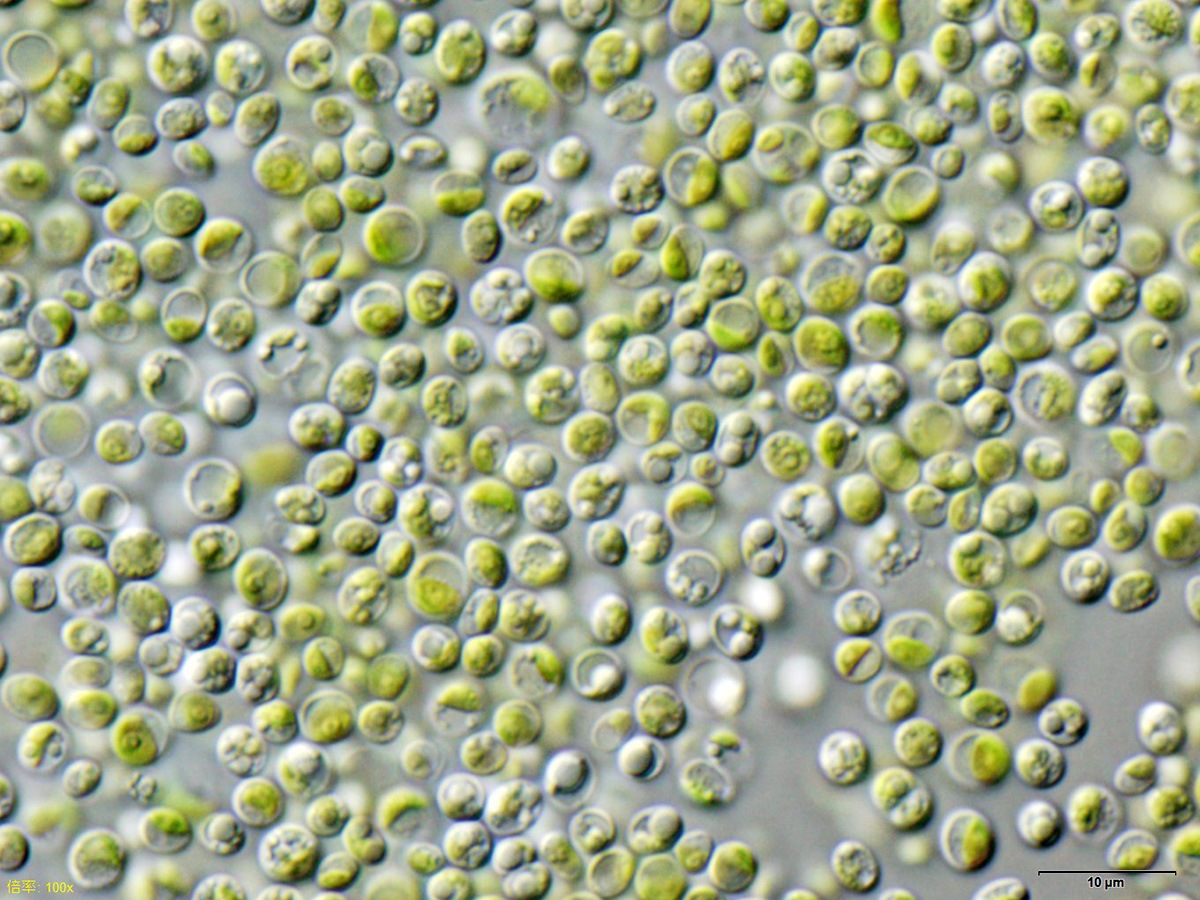
- Chlorella vulgaris

Scientific classification
- Domain: Eukaryota
- Supergroup: Archaeplastida
- Clade: Viridiplantae
- Division: Chlorophyta
- Class: Trebouxiophyceae
- Order: Chlorellales
- Family: Chlorellaceae
- Genus: Chlorella; M.Beijerinck, 1890

Type species
- Chlorella vulgaris Beijerinck

Other species
- Chlorella acuminata; Chlorella autotrophica; Chlorella botryoides; Chlorella colonialis; Chlorella conglomerata; Chlorella elongata; Chlorella faginea; †Chlorella godinezii; Chlorella heliozoae; Chlorella infusionum; Chlorella lewinii; Chlorella miniata; Chlorella nocturna; Chlorella oocystoides; Chlorella pachyderma; Chlorella peruviana; Chlorella photophila; Chlorella pituita; Chlorella pulchelloides; Chlorella rotunda; Chlorella rugosa; Chlorella salina; Chlorella singularis; Chlorella sorokiniana; Chlorella stigmatophora; Chlorella terrestris; Chlorella vannielii; Chlorella variabilis; Chlorella volutis; Chlorella vulgaris

= Chlorella =

Genus of green algae

Chlorella is a genus of about thirteen species of single-celled or colonial green algae of the division Chlorophyta. The cells are spherical in shape, about 2 to 10 μm in diameter, and are without flagella. Their chloroplasts contain the green photosynthetic pigments chlorophyll-a and -b. In ideal conditions cells of Chlorella multiply rapidly, requiring only carbon dioxide, water, sunlight, and a small amount of minerals to reproduce.

The name Chlorella is taken from the Greek χλώρος, chlōros/ khlōros, meaning green, and the Latin diminutive suffix -ella, meaning small. German biochemist and cell physiologist Otto Heinrich Warburg, awarded with the Nobel Prize in Physiology or Medicine in 1931 for his research on cell respiration, also studied photosynthesis in Chlorella. In 1961, Melvin Calvin of the University of California received the Nobel Prize in Chemistry for his research on the pathways of carbon dioxide assimilation in plants using Chlorella.

Chlorella has been considered as a source of food and energy because its photosynthetic efficiency can reach 8%, which exceeds that of other highly efficient crops such as sugar cane.

== Description ==
Chlorella consists of small, rounded cells which are spherical, subspherical, or ellipsoidal, and may be surrounded by a layer of mucilage. The cells contain a single chloroplast which is parietal (lying against the inner side of the cell membrane), with a single pyrenoid that is surrounded by grains of starch.

=== Reproduction ===
Reproduction occurs by the formation of autospores; zoospores or gametes are not known to be produced in Chlorella. In autosporulation, the contents of the cell divide into two, four or sometimes eight protoplasts. Each daughter protoplast rounds off, and are liberated by the rupture of the parent cell wall. On release, each autospore grows to become a new individual. The daughter cell may remain attached to the parent cell wall, thereby forming colonies of cells. The presence of sulphur in the culture medium is considered essential for cell division. It takes place even in the dark with sulphur alone as the source material but under light conditions nitrogen also required in addition. Pearsall and Loose (1937) reported the occurrence of motile cells in Chlorella. Bendix (1964) also observed that Chlorella produces motile cells which might be gametes. These observations have an important bearing on the concept of the life cycle of Chlorella, which at present is considered to be strictly asexual in character.

Asexual reproduction in Chlorella ellipsoides has been studied in detail and the following four phases have been observed during the asexual reproduction.

1. Growth phase: During this phase the cells grow in size by utilizing the photosynthetic products.
2. Ripening phase: In this phase the cells mature and prepare themselves for division.
3. Post ripening phase: During this phase, each mature cell divides twice either in dark or in light. The cells formed in dark are known as dark to light phase, cells again grow in size.
4. Division phase: During this phase the parent cell wall ruptures and unicells are released.

=== Symbiosis ===
A collection of unnamed Chlorella, only identified by strain names such as K10, serve as photosynthetic endosymbionts in the animal Hydra viridissima (more broadly, the whole "green hydra" clade) and the ciliate Pseudoblepharisma tenue. The genome of a strain called A99, attached to H. viridissima A99, was sequenced in 2018. Among all Chlorella with full genomes available at the time of sequencing, A99 is most similar to C. variabilis. On the other hand, the K10 strain appears closer to C. vulgaris on the basis of 18S rRNA and rbcL.

== Taxonomy ==
Chlorella was first described by Martinus Beijerinck in 1890. Since then, over a hundred taxa have been described within the genus. However, biochemical and genomic data has revealed that many of these species were not closely related to each other, even being placed in a separate class Chlorophyceae. In other words, the "green ball" form of Chlorella appears to be a product of convergent evolution and not a natural taxon. Identifying Chlorella-like algae based on morphological features alone is generally not possible.

Some strains of "Chlorella" used for food are incorrectly identified, or correspond to genera that were classified out of true Chlorella. For example, Heterochlorella luteoviridis is typically known as Chlorella luteoviridis which is no longer considered a valid name.

== As a food source ==
When first harvested, Chlorella was suggested as an inexpensive protein supplement to the human diet. According to the American Cancer Society, "available scientific studies do not support its effectiveness for preventing or treating cancer or any other disease in humans".

Under certain growing conditions, Chlorella yields oils that are high in polyunsaturated fats—Chlorella minutissima has yielded eicosapentaenoic acid at 39.9% of total lipids.

=== History ===
Following global fears of an uncontrollable human population boom during the late 1940s and the early 1950s, Chlorella was seen as a new and promising primary food source and as a possible solution to the then-current world hunger crisis. Many people during this time thought hunger would be an overwhelming problem and saw Chlorella as a way to end this crisis by providing large amounts of high-quality food for a relatively low cost.

Many institutions began to research the algae, including the Carnegie Institution, the Rockefeller Foundation, the NIH, UC Berkeley, the Atomic Energy Commission, and Stanford University. Following World War II, many Europeans were starving, and many Malthusians attributed this not only to the war, but also to the inability of the world to produce enough food to support the increasing population. According to a 1946 FAO report, the world would need to produce 25 to 35% more food in 1960 than in 1939 to keep up with the increasing population, while health improvements would require a 90 to 100% increase. Because meat was costly and energy-intensive to produce, protein shortages were also an issue. Increasing cultivated area alone would go only so far in providing adequate nutrition to the population. The USDA calculated that, to feed the U.S. population by 1975, it would have to add 200 million acres (800,000 km^{2}) of land, but only 45 million were available. One way to combat national food shortages was to increase the land available for farmers, yet the American frontier and farm land had long since been extinguished in trade for expansion and urban life. Hopes rested solely on new agricultural techniques and technologies. Because of these circumstances, an alternative solution was needed.

To cope with the upcoming postwar population boom in the United States and elsewhere, researchers decided to tap into the unexploited sea resources. Initial testing by the Stanford Research Institute showed Chlorella (when growing in warm, sunny, shallow conditions) could convert 20% of solar energy into a plant that, when dried, contains 50% protein. In addition, Chlorella contains fat and vitamins. The plant's photosynthetic efficiency allows it to yield more protein per unit area than any plant—one scientist predicted 10,000 tons of protein a year could be produced with just 20 workers staffing a 1000-acre (4-km^{2}) Chlorella farm. The pilot research performed at Stanford and elsewhere led to immense press from journalists and newspapers, yet did not lead to large-scale algae production. Chlorella seemed like a viable option because of the technological advances in agriculture at the time and the widespread acclaim it got from experts and scientists who studied it. Algae researchers had even hoped to add a neutralized Chlorella powder to conventional food products, as a way to fortify them with vitamins and minerals.

When the preliminary laboratory results were published, the scientific community at first backed the possibilities of Chlorella. Science News Letter praised the optimistic results in an article entitled "Algae to Feed the Starving". John Burlew, the editor of the Carnegie Institution of Washington book Algal Culture: From Laboratory to Pilot Plant, stated, "the algae culture may fill a very real need", which Science News Letter turned into "future populations of the world will be kept from starving by the production of improved or educated algae related to the green scum on ponds". The cover of the magazine also featured Arthur D. Little's Cambridge laboratory, which was a supposed future food factory. A few years later, the magazine published an article entitled "Tomorrow's Dinner", which stated, "There is no doubt in the mind of scientists that the farms of the future will actually be factories." Science Digest also reported, "common pond scum would soon become the world's most important agricultural crop." However, in the decades since those claims were made, algae have not been cultivated on that large of a scale.

=== Current status ===
Since the growing world food problem of the 1940s was solved by better crop efficiency and other advances in traditional agriculture, Chlorella has not seen the kind of public and scientific interest that it had in the 1940s. Chlorella has only a niche market for companies promoting it as a dietary supplement.

==== Production difficulties ====
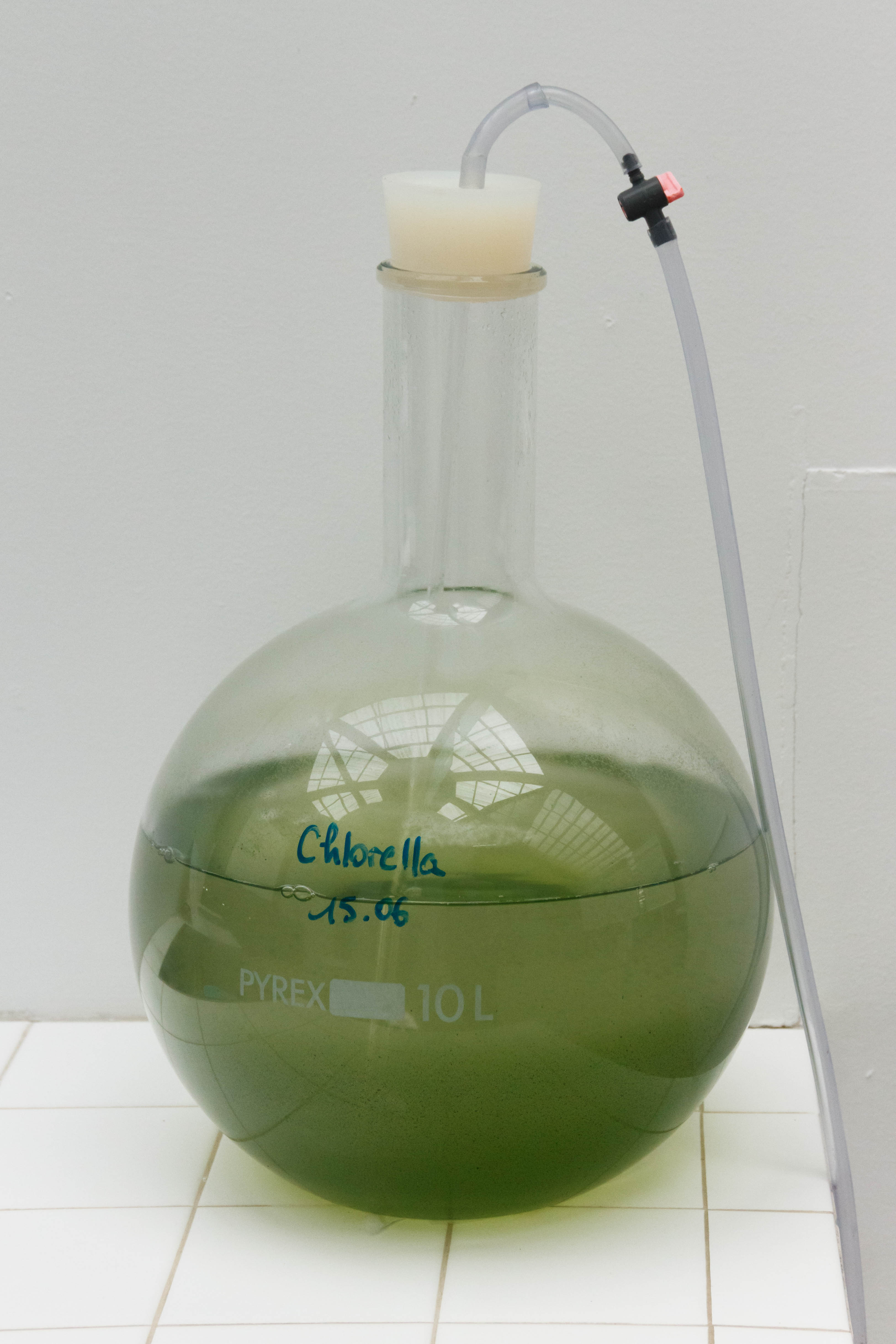
Chlorella culture, L'Eclosarium, Houat.

The experimental research was carried out in laboratories, rather than in the field, and scientists discovered that Chlorella would be much more difficult to produce than previously thought. To be practical, the algae grown would have to be placed either in artificial light or in shade to produce at its maximum photosynthetic efficiency. In addition, for the Chlorella to be as productive as the world would require, it would have to be grown in carbonated water, which would have added millions to the production cost. A sophisticated process, and additional cost, was required to harvest the crop and for Chlorella to be a viable food source, its cell walls would have to be pulverized. The plant could reach its nutritional potential only in highly modified artificial situations. Another problem was developing sufficiently palatable food products from Chlorella.

Although the production of Chlorella looked promising and involved creative technology, it has not to date been cultivated on the scale some had predicted. It has not been sold on the scale of Spirulina, soybean products, or whole grains. Costs have remained high, and Chlorella has for the most part been sold as a health food, for cosmetics, or as animal feed. After a decade of experimentation, studies showed that following exposure to sunlight, Chlorella captured just 2.5% of the solar energy, not much better than conventional crops. Chlorella, too, was found by scientists in the 1960s to be impossible for humans and other animals to digest in its natural state due to the tough cell walls encapsulating the nutrients, which presented further problems for its use in American food production.

== Use in carbon dioxide reduction and oxygen production ==
In 1965, the Russian CELSS experiment BIOS-3 determined that 8 m^{2} of exposed Chlorella could remove carbon dioxide and replace oxygen within the sealed environment for a single human. The algae were grown in vats underneath artificial light.

== Dietary supplement ==
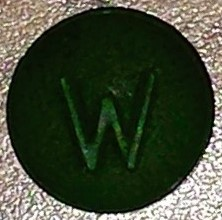
Chlorella in pill form.

Chlorella is consumed as a dietary supplement. Some manufacturers of Chlorella products have falsely asserted that it has health benefits, including an ability to treat cancer, for which the American Cancer Society stated "available scientific studies do not support its effectiveness for preventing or treating cancer or any other disease in humans". The United States Food and Drug Administration has issued warning letters to supplement companies for falsely advertising health benefits of consuming chlorella products, such as one company in October 2020.

There is some support from animal studies of chlorella's ability to detoxify insecticides. Chlorella protothecoides accelerated the detoxification of rats poisoned with chlordecone, a persistent insecticide, decreasing the half-life of the toxin from 40 to 19 days. The ingested algae passed through the gastrointestinal tract unharmed, interrupted the enteric recirculation of the persistent insecticide, and subsequently eliminated the bound chlordecone with the feces.

== Health concerns ==
A 2002 study showed that Chlorella cell walls contain lipopolysaccharides, endotoxins found in Gram-negative bacteria that affect the immune system and may cause inflammation. However, more recent studies have found that the lipopolysaccharides in organisms other than Gram-negative bacteria, for example in cyanobacteria, are considerably different from the lipopolysaccharides in Gram-negative bacteria.

== See also ==
- Calvin cycle
- Chlorellosis, a disease caused by the infection of Chlorella
- List of ineffective cancer treatments
- Quorn: food made from mycoprotein
- Soyuz 28, a 1978 space mission which included experiments on Chlorella
- Spirulina (dietary supplement)
