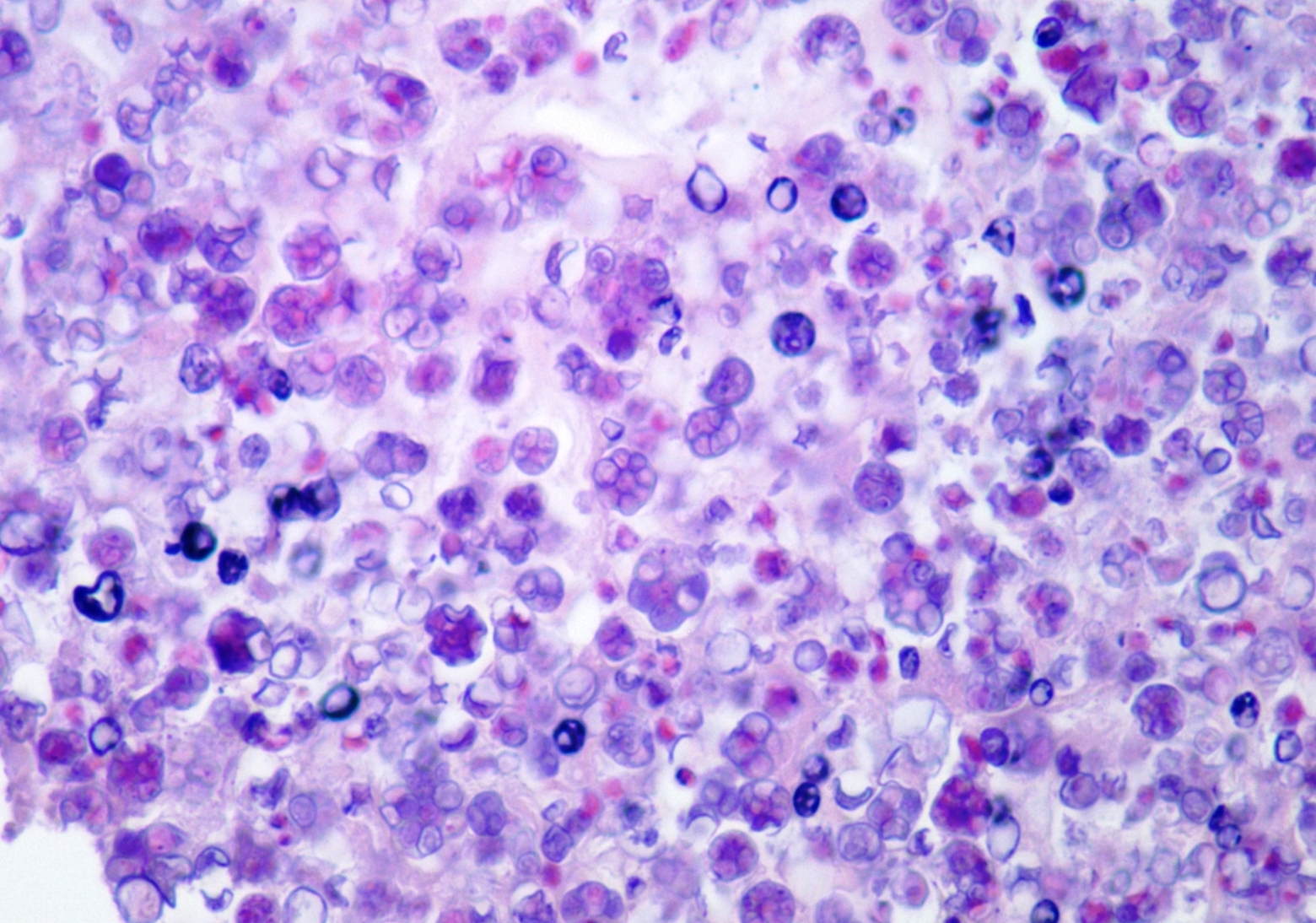

Scientific classification
- Kingdom: Plantae
- Division: Chlorophyta
- Class: Trebouxiophyceae
- Order: Chlorellales
- Family: Chlorellaceae
- Genus: Prototheca
- Species: P. wickerhamii

Binomial name
- Prototheca wickerhamii K.Tubaki & M.Soneda

= Prototheca wickerhamii =

Species of alga

Prototheca wickerhamii is a ubiquitous green alga that does not have chlorophyll. The species is widely present in the environment but is a cause of a rare opportunistic infection in humans and livestock known as protothecosis.

== Biology ==
P. wickerhamii has a round to elliptical cell shape measuring 3–11 μm in diameter. The organism has thick wall (theca) with internal septations that form the small wedge-shaped endospores, which are arranged radially and moulded (morula-like form). Reproduction is asexual by release of the spores from the sporangia, which can occur every 5–6 hours in ideal conditions.

P. wickerhamii can be found ubiquitously in the environment as Prototheca species have been found associated with plants, fresh and sea water as well as the soil. P. wickerhamii can be cultured on Sabouraud dextrose agar.

== Infection ==
P. wickerhamii can cause opportunistic infections, commonly in individuals with a suppressed immune system due to disease or medication. It is the primary cause of protothecosis in humans. Infection usually results by direct traumatic inoculation and most commonly presents as nodules of the skin.

Diagnosis can be made through culture of diseased tissue in Sabouraud dextrose agar or by visualization of sporangia containing sporangiospores on tissue biopsy (using hematoxylin/eosin, GMS, or PAS histochemical stains). The organism incites a chronic granulomatous inflammation with infiltrate of histiocytes, lymphocytes, giant cells and occasional eosinophils.

Differential diagnosis: This organism may be confused with Coccidioides immitis, which is much larger

== Antimicrobial therapy ==
There is currently no standardized for infection with P. wickerhamii. Successful treatment with Voriconazole and amphotericin B have been reported. Some strains have also showed susceptibility to itraconazole and posaconazole.
