= Microalgae =

Microscopic algae

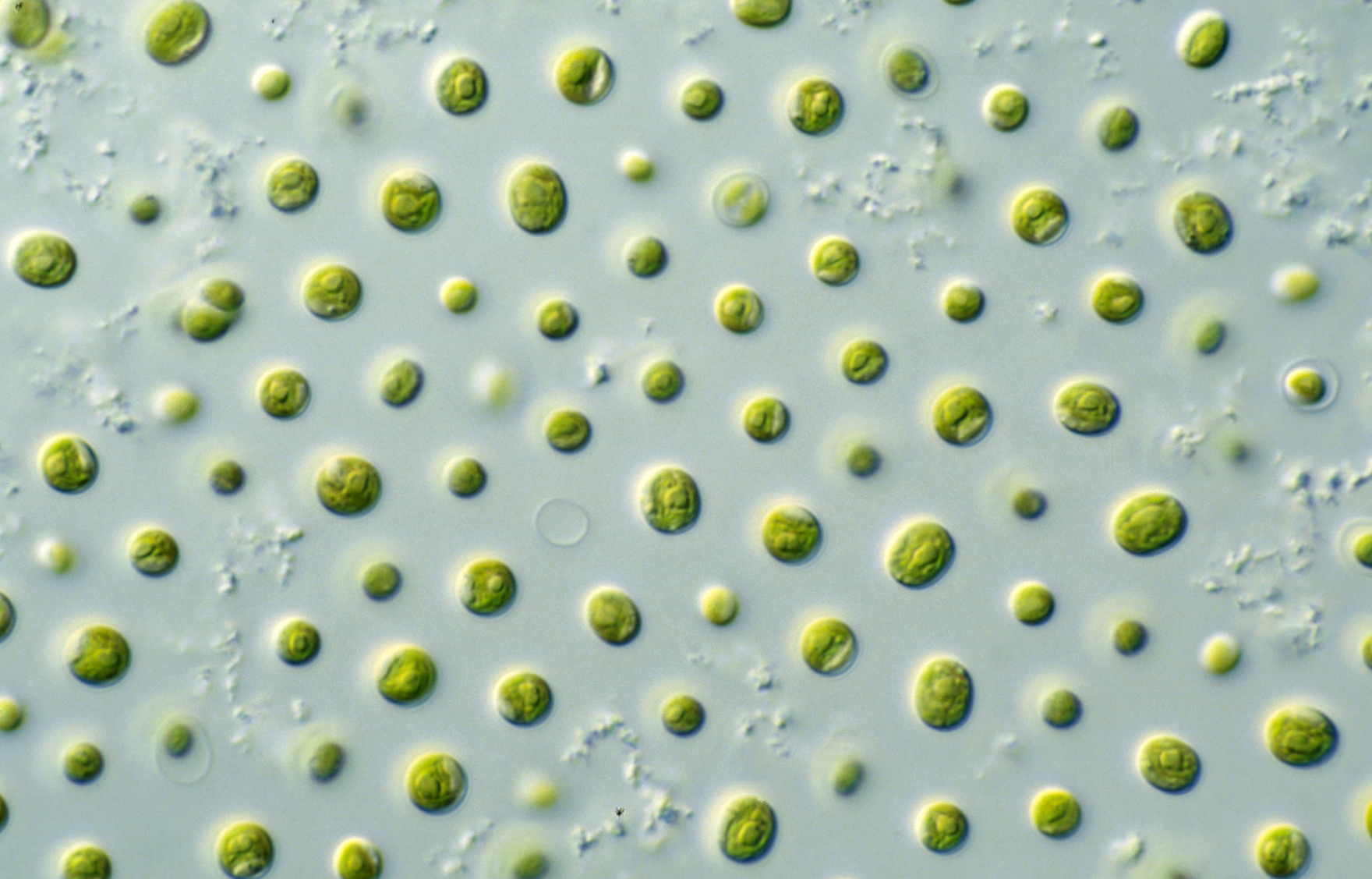
Nannochloropsis microalgae

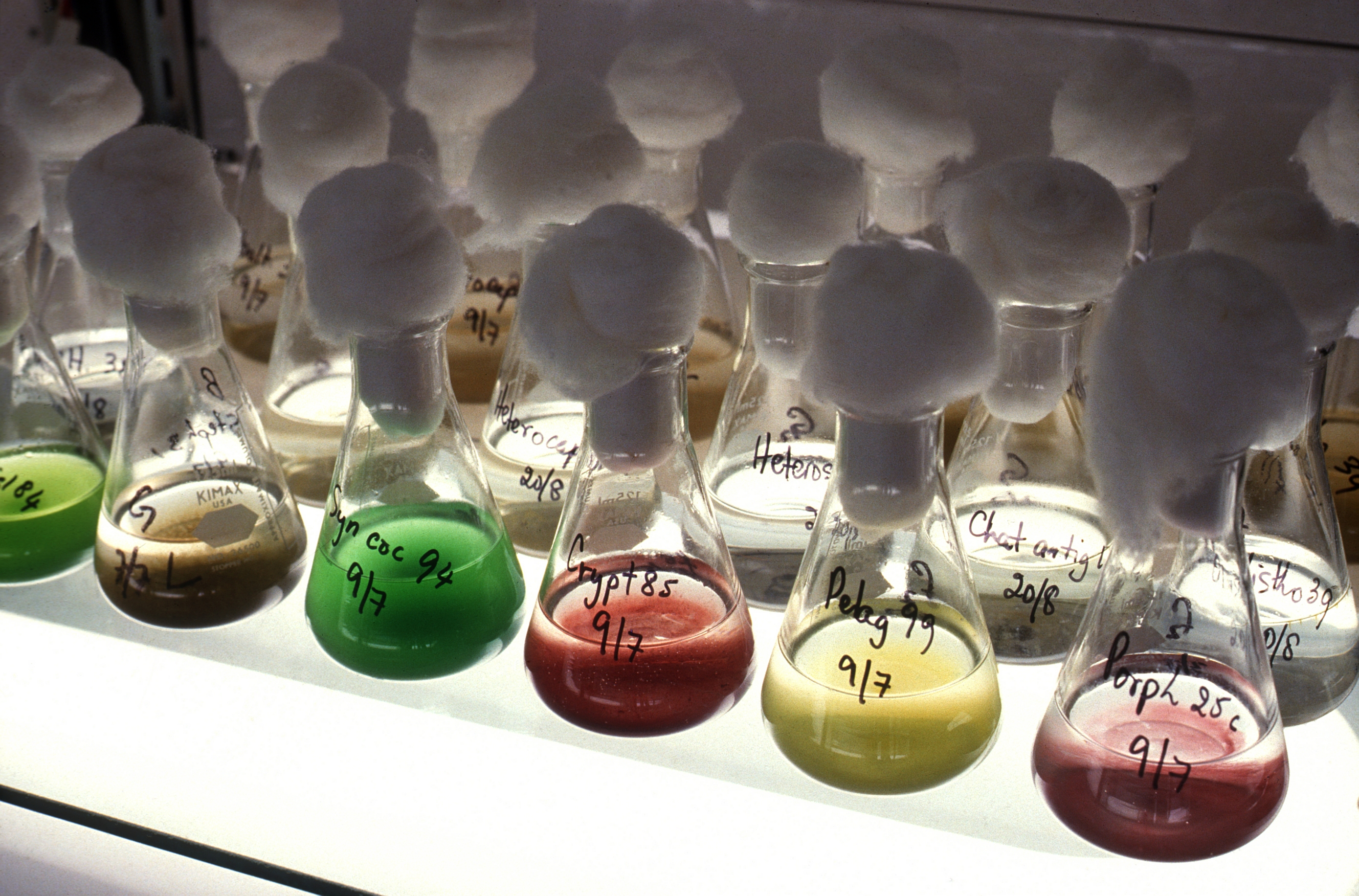
Collection of microalgae cultures in CSIRO's lab

Microalgae or microphytes are microscopic algae invisible to the naked eye. They are phytoplankton typically found in freshwater and marine systems, living in both the water column and sediment. They are unicellular species which exist individually, or in chains or groups. Depending on the species, their sizes can range from a few micrometers (μm) to a few hundred micrometers. Unlike higher plants, microalgae do not have roots, stems, or leaves. They are specially adapted to an environment dominated by viscous forces.

Microalgae, capable of performing photosynthesis, are important for life on earth; they produce approximately half of the atmospheric oxygen and use the greenhouse gas carbon dioxide to grow photoautotrophically. "Marine photosynthesis is dominated by microalgae, which together with cyanobacteria, are collectively called phytoplankton." Microalgae, together with bacteria, form the base of the food web and provide energy for all the trophic levels above them. Microalgae biomass is often measured with chlorophyll a concentrations and can provide a useful index of potential production. Microalgae are very similar to terrestrial plants because they contain chlorophyll, so also requiring sunlight in order to grow and live. They can often be found floating in the top part of the ocean, which is where sunlight touches the water. Microalgae require nitrates, phosphates, and sulfur which they convert into carbohydrates, fats, and proteins. Due to this converting ability, they are known to have health and nutritional benefits. It has been found to work as an ingredient in some foods, as well as a biostimulant in agricultural products.

The biodiversity of microalgae is enormous and they represent an almost untapped resource. It has been estimated that about 200,000-800,000 species in many different genera exist of which about 50,000 species are described. Over 15,000 novel compounds originating from algal biomass have been chemically determined. Examples include carotenoids, fatty acids, enzymes, polymers, peptides, toxins and sterols. Besides providing these valuable metabolites, microalgae are regarded as a potential feedstock for biofuels and has also emerged as a promising microorganism in bioremediation. Microalgae is an aquatic organism that has a lot of different bioactive compounds that compose it, including carotenoids, peptides, phenolics, and vitamin B_{12}. Many of them have been found to have positive health effects, which includes anticancer, antihypertensive, anti-obesity, antioxidative, and cardiovascular protection. It has faced lots of challenges due to species diversity and variations in biomass and cultivation factors.

An exception to the microalgae family is the colorless Prototheca which are devoid of any chlorophyll. These achlorophic algae switch to parasitism and thus cause the disease protothecosis in human and animals.

== Characteristics and uses ==
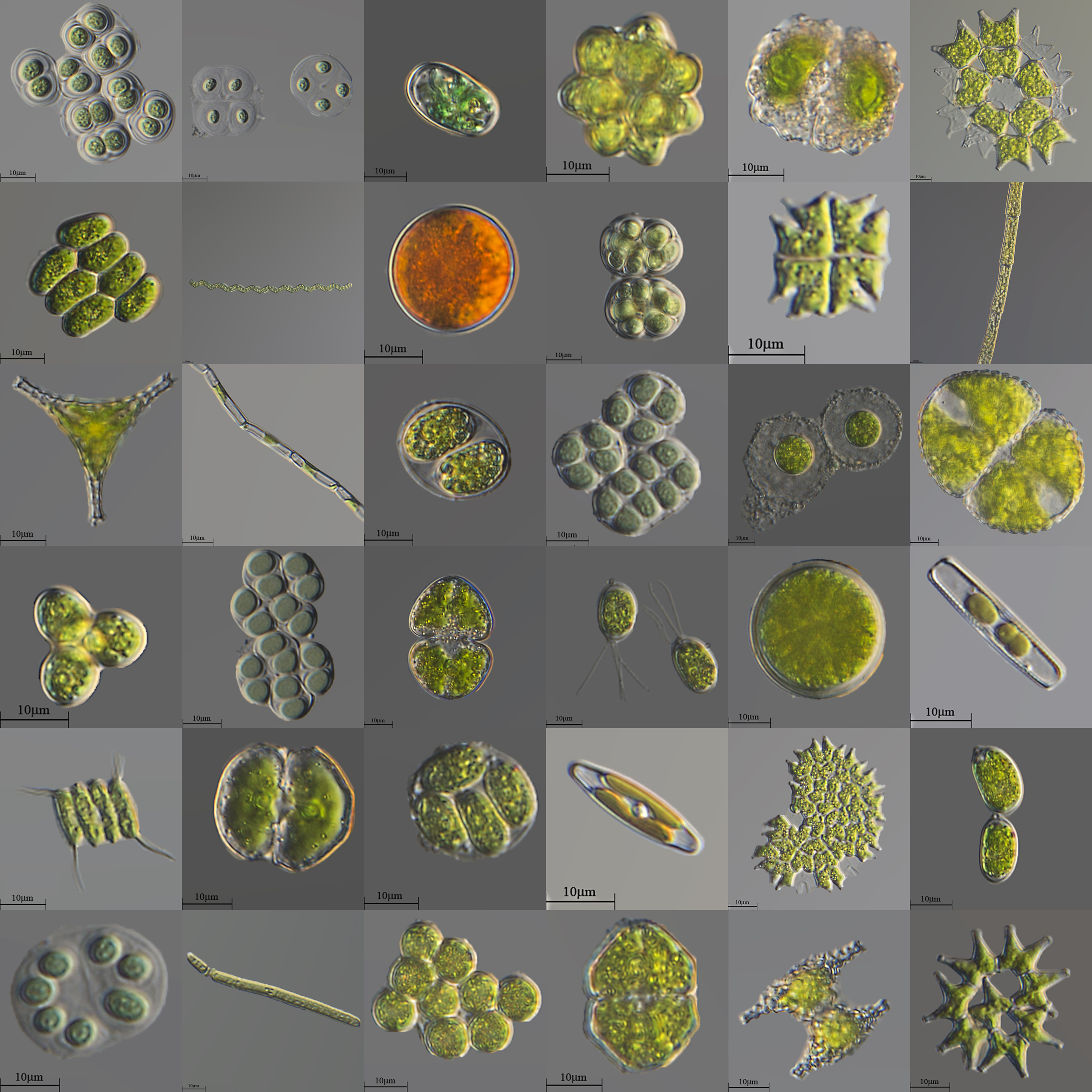
A variety of unicellular and colonial freshwater microalgae

The chemical composition of microalgae is not an intrinsic constant factor but varies over a wide range of factors, both depending on species and on cultivation conditions. Some microalgae have the capacity to acclimate to changes in environmental conditions by altering their chemical composition in response to environmental variability. A particularly dramatic example is their ability to replace phospholipids with non-phosphorus membrane lipids in phosphorus-depleted environments. It is possible to accumulate the desired products in microalgae to a large extent by changing environmental factors, like temperature, illumination, pH, CO_{2} supply, salt and nutrients.

Microphytes also produce chemical signals which contribute to prey selection, defense, and avoidance. These chemical signals affect large scale tropic structures such as algal blooms but propagate by simple diffusion and laminar advective flow. Microalgae such as microphytes constitute the basic foodstuff for numerous aquaculture species, especially filtering bivalves.

The majority of microalgae is not edible, so most of its uses are not connected to food or energy aside from connections to microbial electrochemical technologies when utilizing microalgae to create biodiesel from lipidic food waste. Instead, they are used in various biofertilizers, cosmetics, and pharmaceuticals. Microalgae are seen as valuable biofertilizers because they help to improve both plant growth and soil fertilization. They are known to be a more sustainable option compared to agrochemicals due to their ability to decrease the usage of synthetic fertilizers, improve soil fertility, and optimize nutrients. The use of microalgae in cosmetic products is also becoming more prevalent. This is due to some of the benefits that arise from microalgae's compounds, including anti-aging, skin brightening, and UV protection. Algal can be found in many cosmetic products that people use on a daily basis. The compounds are used in antioxidants, moisturizing agents, skin sensitizers, sunscreens, thickening agents, etc. There are many different uses for microalgae in the pharmaceutical world. They produce bioactive compounds which possess therapeutic properties and serve as a drug delivery system. The extracellular-vesicles, which are derived from the microalgae, can be used for drug delivery. They are capable of crossing biological barriers, encapsulating proteins, nucleic acids, and small molecules.

=== Photo- and chemosynthetic algae ===
Photosynthetic and chemosynthetic microbes can also form symbiotic relationships with host organisms. They provide them with vitamins and polyunsaturated fatty acids, necessary for the growth of the bivalves which are unable to synthesize it themselves. Microalgae also is a rich source of bioactive compounds and nutrients. They are considered to be valuable in environmental applications, food, and pharmaceuticals due to the presence of lipids, proteins, and vitamins found within. In addition, because the cells grow in aqueous suspension, they have more efficient access to water, CO_{2}, and other nutrients.

Microalgae play a major role in nutrient cycling and fixing inorganic carbon into organic molecules and expressing oxygen in marine biosphere.

While fish oil has become famous for its omega-3 fatty acid content, fish do not actually produce omega-3s, instead accumulating their omega-3 reserves by consuming microalgae. These omega-3 fatty acids can be obtained in the human diet directly from the microalgae that produce them.

Microalgae can accumulate considerable amounts of proteins depending on species and cultivation conditions. Due to their ability to grow on non-arable land microalgae may provide an alternative protein source for human consumption or animal feed. Microalgae proteins are also investigated as thickening agents or emulsion and foam stabilizers in the food industry to replace animal based proteins.

Some microalgae accumulate chromophores like chlorophyll, carotenoids, phycobiliproteins or polyphenols that may be extracted and used as coloring agents.

== Cultivation of microalgae ==
Microalgae cultivation can take place in closed systems and open ponds. Open ponds are often seen as a more economically sound choice for production in a commercial setting. A range of microalgae species are produced in hatcheries and are used in a variety of ways for commercial purposes, including for human nutrition, as biofuel, in the aquaculture of other organisms, in the manufacture of pharmaceuticals and cosmetics, and as biofertiliser. However, the low cell density is a major bottleneck in commercial viability of many microalgae derived products, especially low cost commodities.

Studies have investigated the main factors in the success of a microalgae hatchery system to be:

- Geometry and scale of cultivation systems (referred as photobioreactors);
- Light intensity;
- Concentration of carbon dioxide (CO_{2}) in the gas phase
- Nutrient levels (mainly N, P, K)
- Mixing of culture

== See also ==
- AlgaeBase
- Raceway pond
