= Algal nutrient solution =

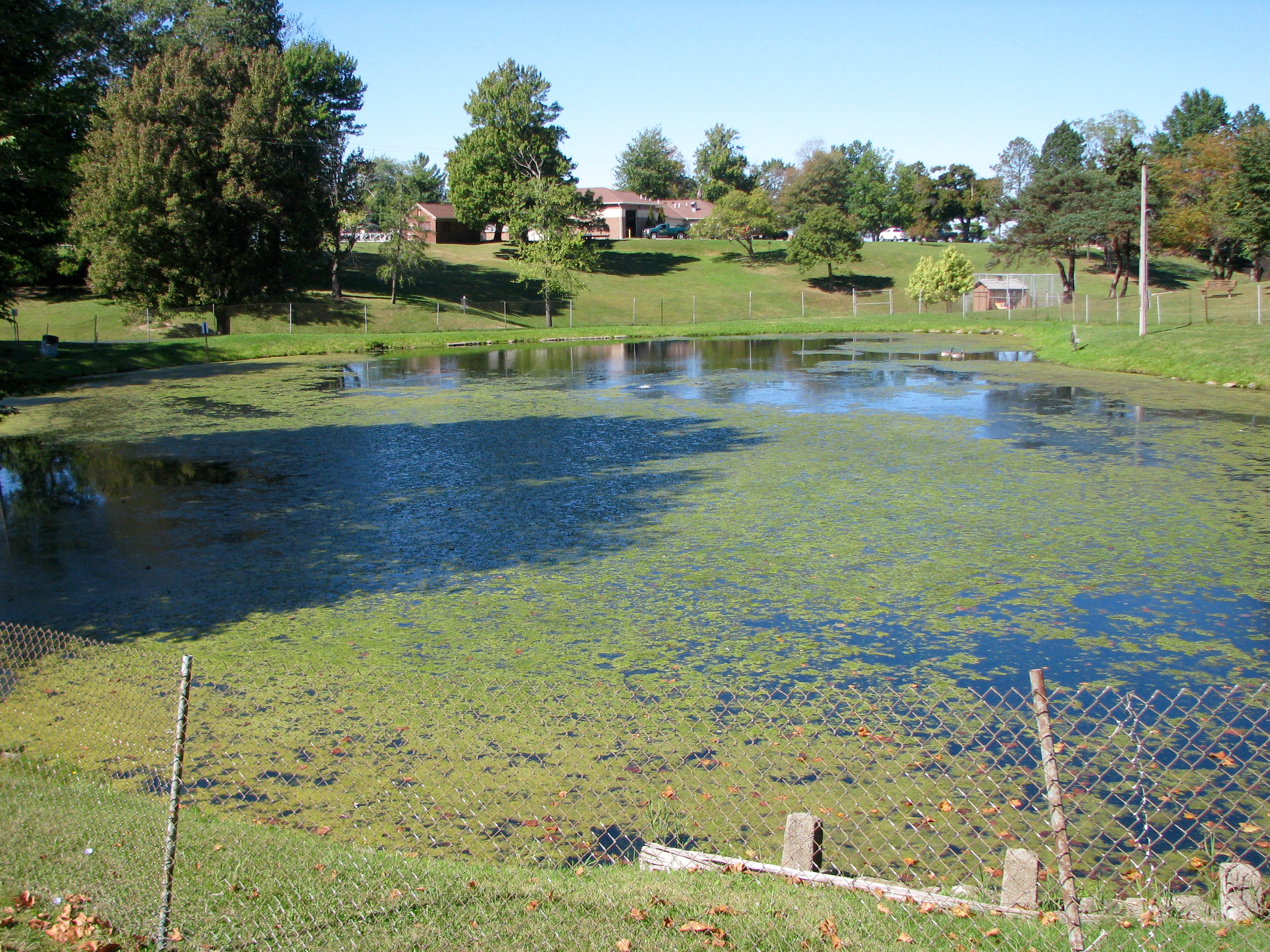
Algae Covered Pond

Algal nutrient solutions are made up of a mixture of chemical salts and seawater. Sometimes referred to as "Growth Media", nutrient solutions (e.g., the Hoagland solution, along with carbon dioxide and light), provide the materials needed for algae to grow. Nutrient solutions, as opposed to fertilizers, are designed specifically for use in aquatic environments and their composition is much more precise. In a unified system, algal biomass can be collected by utilizing carbon dioxide emanating from power plants and wastewater discharged by both industrial and domestic sources. This approach allows for the concurrent exploitation of the microalgae's capabilities in both carbon dioxide fixation and wastewater treatment. Algae, macroalgae, and microalgae hold promise in addressing critical global challenges. Sustainable development goals can be advanced through algae-based solutions, to promote a healthy global ecosystem.

== Infrastructure ==
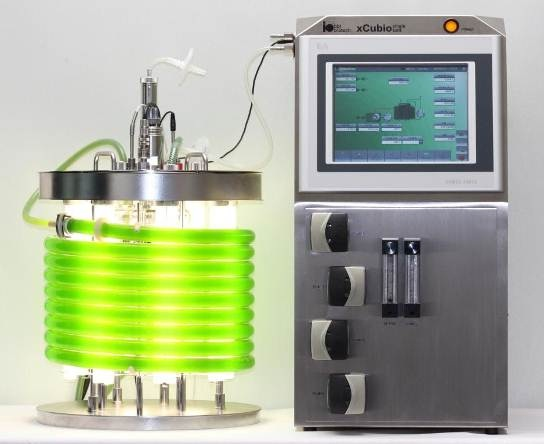
Algae Photo-Bio Reactor

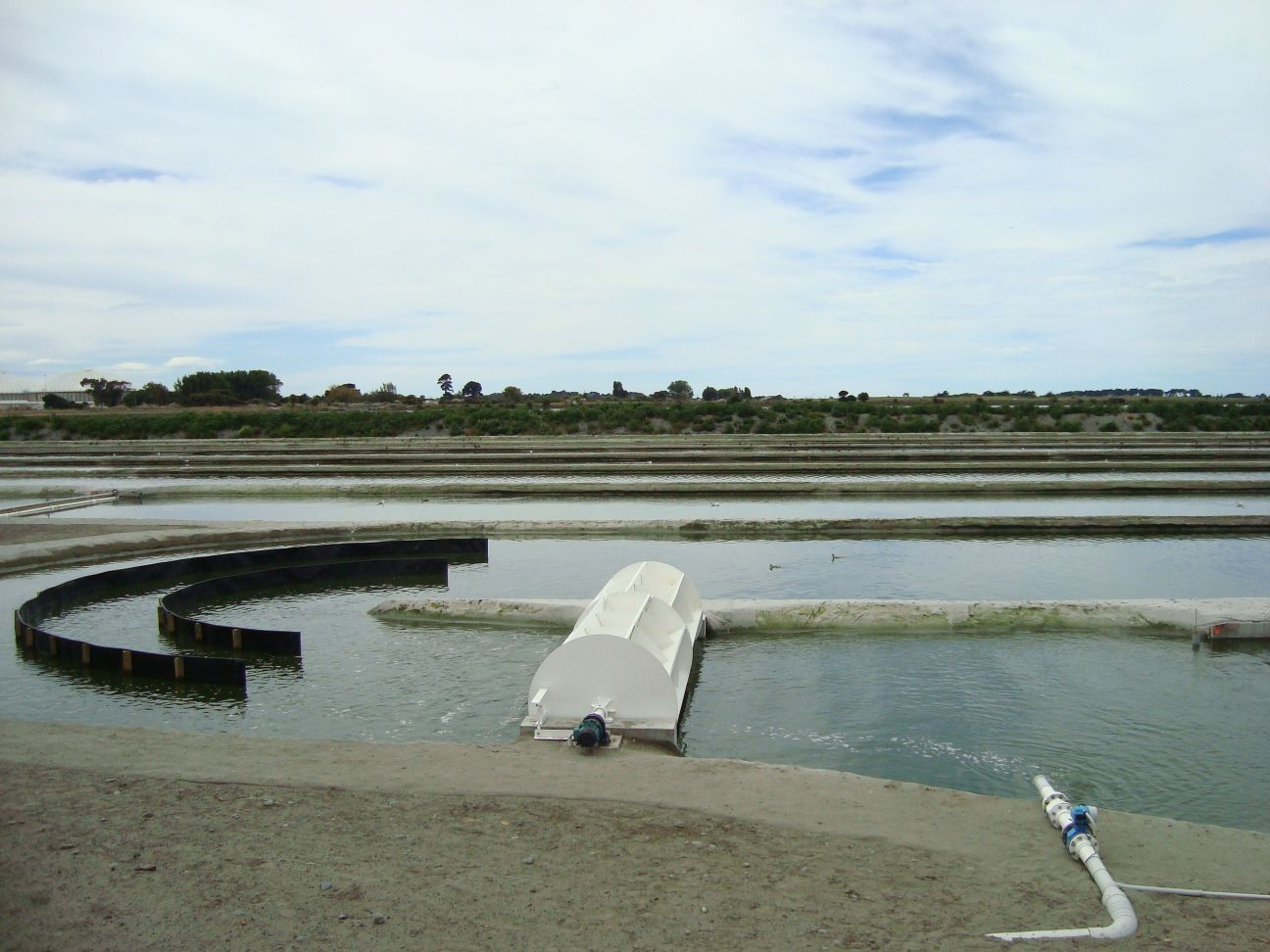
Algae Raceway Pond

There are two infrastructures for creating algae-based solutions: open ponds/raceway ponds or Photo-Bio Reactors (PBRs).

== Photo-bio reactors ==
Photobioreactors are becoming more prevalent in the cultivation of algae, particularly for the production of valuable resources and small-scale experimental applications. Recently, there has been an increased consideration of using photobioreactors for large-scale algal biomass production, driven by their ability to create ideal growth conditions. Enclosed reactors offer protection against bacterial contamination, and the use of shallow tubing ensures effective utilization of light. The infusion of CO_{2} through bubbling enhances the efficiency of carbon uptake, while the design minimizes water loss. In comparison to raceway ponds, photobioreactors exhibit significantly higher rates of productivity.

== Raceway (open) ponds ==
Raceway ponds, much like the oxidation ditches utilized in wastewater treatment systems, are expansive open basins distinguished by their shallow depths and lengths that far exceed their widths. Typically, they are constructed with a concrete shell lined with polyvinyl chloride (PVC), boasting dimensions that vary from 10 to 100 meters in length and 1 to 10 meters in width, with depths ranging from 10 to 50 centimeters. William J. Oswald, was a figure in the field of environmental engineering, particularly known for his contributions to wastewater treatment and algal cultivation. William J. Oswald is renowned for his research on the use of algae in wastewater treatment. He advocated for the integration of algal ponds with wastewater treatment plants as a cost-effective and environmentally friendly method for nutrient removal and biomass production. In the 1950s, Oswald championed the open pond as the most feasible approach to integrate algal cultivation with wastewater treatment. His work in the 1950s and beyond helped pave the way for the development and implementation of algal-based treatment systems worldwide.

== Process ==
To make the most of the biomass, it's crucial to efficiently gather the algae at the start of the processing stage. The method chosen for harvesting depends on the type of algae being grown. Microalgae, with their small cell size, need more advanced harvesting techniques compared to larger macroalgae. Often, a combination of methods is used to achieve a final biomass that has the right moisture content. Common ways to harvest algae include using microfilters, causing particles to clump together (flocculation), allowing them to settle (sedimentation), using flotation, and employing centrifuges.

== Benefits ==
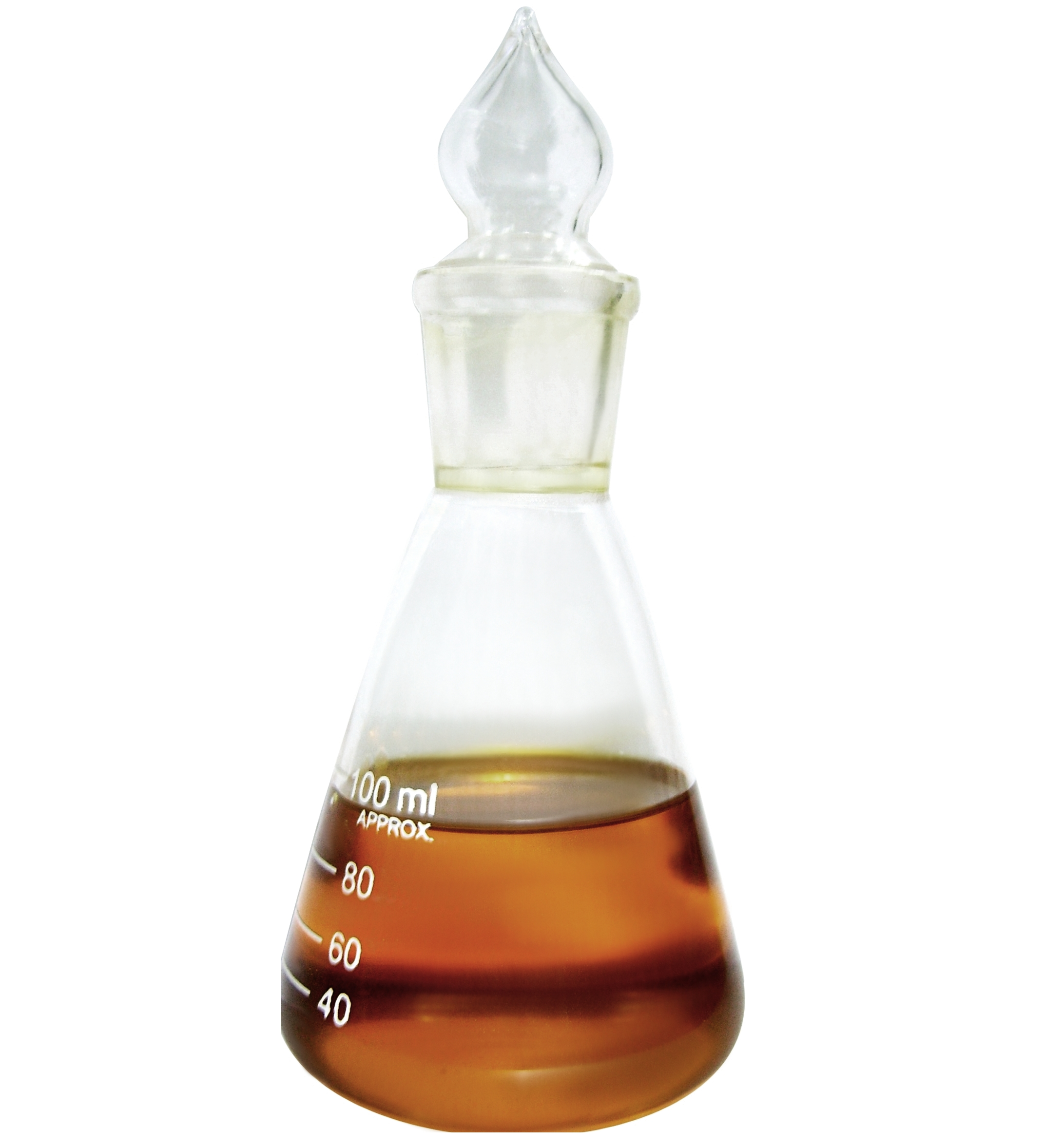
Biodiesel

Biodiesel stands as a promising contender in relation to traditional fossil diesel fuel. The rapid growth, boasting up to 4–6 harvest cycles annually, presents a notable advantage. Unlike predecessors in biofuel production, macroalgae thrive in aquatic environments, sidestepping concerns over land use and freshwater consumption. It surpasses terrestrial biomass in several aspects: yielding higher levels of carbohydrates and biomass, enjoying widespread availability, and avoiding competition with food crops or arable land. The quality of their by-products adds to their appeal. Notably, their capacity to sequester CO_{2} and integrate seamlessly into wastewater treatment processes enhances the sustainable energy initiative aspect. Macroalgae thrive in diverse environments, from saltwater to municipal wastewater, requiring neither arable land nor industrial fertilizers. Moreover, they can be harnessed for biomethane production through thermal or biological gasification, offering flexibility in biomass selection.

== Nutritional value and alternative uses ==
In recent years, significant attention has focused on the potential of microalgae as a biofuel source. Microalgae, yielding between 19,000 – 57,000 liters of oil per acre annually, surpassing other forms of biodiesel resources. This oil is then transformed into biodiesel using conventional transesterification methods. The residual biomass harbors valuable components such as lipids, proteins, and soluble polysaccharides. These components can be leveraged for the production of bio-oil, bioethanol, biohydrogen, and biogas through diverse thermochemical and biochemical pathways, thereby enhancing the overall energy balance.

Algae can also serve as an alternative food source for humans. It typically boasts abundant protein levels, particularly in red varieties like Pyropia tenera, where it may constitute as much as 47% of the dry mass. These proteins are valuable not only as a dietary protein source, providing essential amino acids, but also for their bioactive properties, including specific enzymes. Algae is an alternative for gelatin and can also be a much more natural/healthier source for creating low carb, gluten and fat-free foods.

Algae presents a distinct advantage over traditional food and feed sources, as it does not compete with them and does not require changes in land use. This characteristic makes algal-based fuels a promising solution to alleviate the food versus fuel dilemma in the future. Unlike other biofuels, algal feedstock remains unaffected by fluctuations in food market prices, ensuring greater price stability for consumers of algal-based fuel. Algae possess significant promise due to their rapid growth rate and exceptional yield per hectare, surpassing that of land-based biomass by a considerable margin. Renowned as the swiftest proliferating organisms on Earth, they can reproduce within mere hours. Research conducted underscores their remarkable capacity, demonstrating growth rates 20–30 times faster than food crops and yielding up to 30 times more fuel than alternative biofuel sources.

== Environmental sustainability ==
Algae exhibits geographical versatility, capable of thriving in diverse climates, including the most severe environments on Earth. They demonstrate adaptability across varying altitudes, latitudes, and geographies, without the need for agriculturally productive or environmentally sensitive land for reproduction. Unlike energy crops like oil palm and rapeseed, which have sparked sustainability concerns due to food versus fuel competition and land occupation. Algae does not compete with crops for arable land and can utilize wastelands unsuitable for agriculture owing to their ability to adapt to harsh environments. Furthermore, the adaptability enables survival in industrial, municipal, and agricultural wastewaters, as well as on landfills, facilitating wastewater treatment by nutrient removal such as nitrogen (N) and phosphorus (P), thereby contributing to community access to clean water.

== Environmental impact and management challenges ==
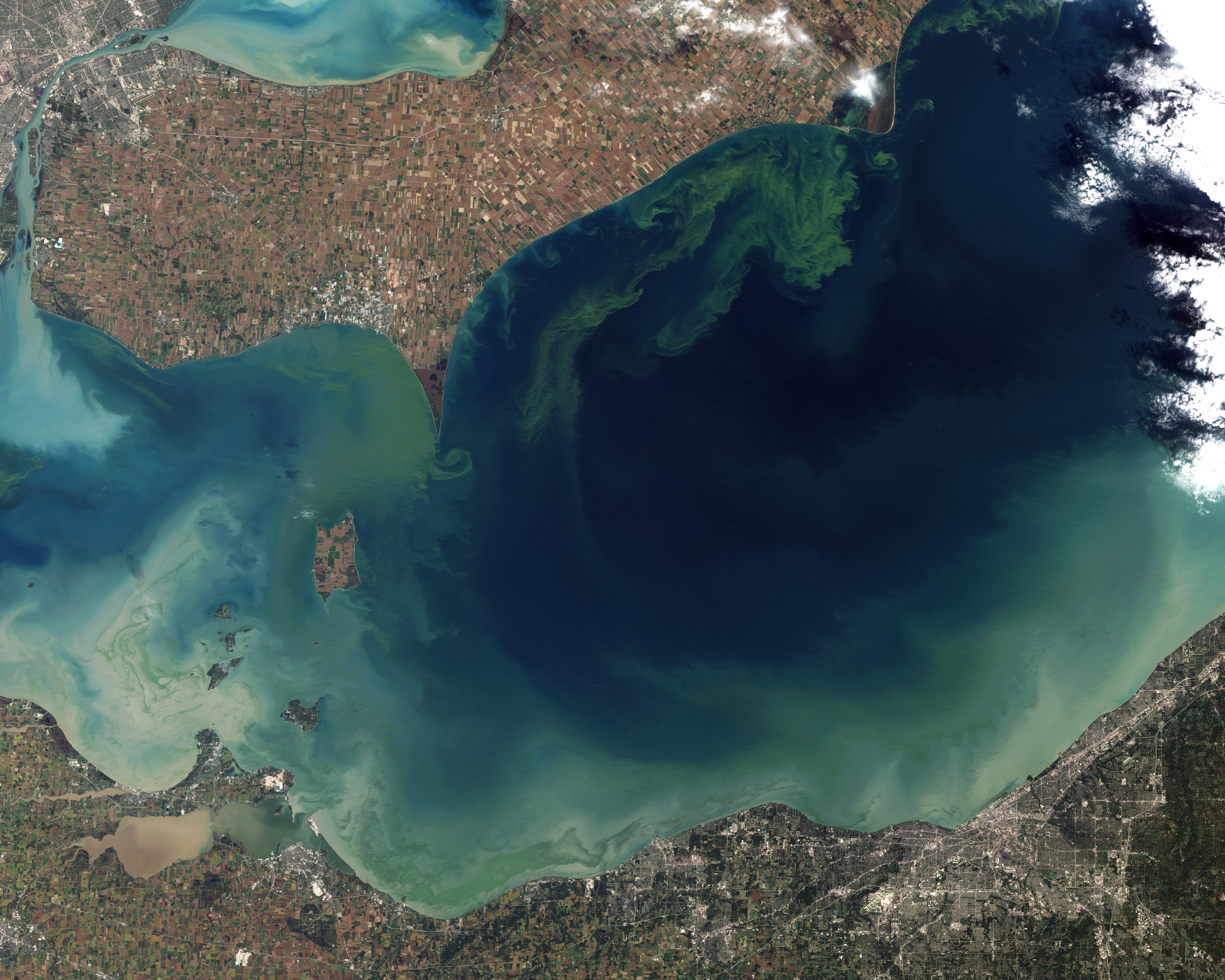
The green scum shown in this image is the algae bloom in Lake Erie.

Within aquatic ecosystems, algae assumes a pivotal role by utilizing photosynthesis to transform water and carbon dioxide into sugar, concurrently releasing oxygen as a by-product. However, inadequate management can create significant environmental consequences. One outcome is the manifestation of algae blooms or eutrophication, primarily triggered by runoff from land sources. This leads to an excessive nutrient influx, fostering the overgrowth of algae. Upon the decay of these algal blooms, bacteria consume a substantial amount of dissolved oxygen, depleting oxygen levels in the water. This occurrence can result in the formation of dead zones or hypoxia, characterized by minimal or no oxygen, rendering them unsuitable for aquatic life.

== Challenges in algae cultivation infrastructure ==
Although open ponds can be used for algae cultivation, they are low production which can take year-round development.PBRs are mainly for small scale use despite their high-productivity. The limitations also stem from their high energy and cost demands during both production and operation phases. Unlike alternative infrastructure, PBRs require significantly larger surface areas for the volume of algal broth, leading to greater material volumes and subsequent spikes in capital energy input. These factors elevate environmental impacts associated with their implementation.

== Production cost and technological barriers ==
Despite the immense potential of both macro- and microalgae in various fields, the production cost of algal fuel remains higher compared to fossil fuels. Although strides have been made in reducing nutrient costs by utilizing wastewater and flue gases, the expenses associated with mechanical equipment and technologies remain substantial. Essentially, the foundational processes involved in the production and commercialization of algae biofuels persist as significant barriers. Similarly, effectively utilizing chemicals, technology, electricity, and labor for microalgal biofuel production poses considerable challenges. Cultivating microalgae in both closed and open reactors under optimal pH, temperature, and light conditions is crucial for achieving rapid biomass doubling and high productivity.

== Processing challenges and resource availability ==
The complex procedures involved in processing algae cells pose limitations on their use as a feedstock for biodiesel production. Hence, researchers must prioritize addressing these challenges and enhancing production efficiency. Essential for algal development are solar light, carbon dioxide, water, and various nutrients such as nitrogen, sulfur, phosphorus, and iron. However, ensuring the availability of these nutrient sources and maintaining suitable environmental conditions amidst changing climatic patterns presents sustainability challenges. Cost is another significant hurdle, as the expenses associated with growing and harvesting algae are considerable. Utilizing wastewater for cultivating algae emerges as one cost-effective strategy.

== See also ==
- List of algal culture collections
- Algaculture
- Algal fuel
- Aquatic Species Program
- Hydroponics
- Seri microalgae culture collection
- Chu 13, an algal growth medium
