= Raceway pond =

Pond for cultivating algae

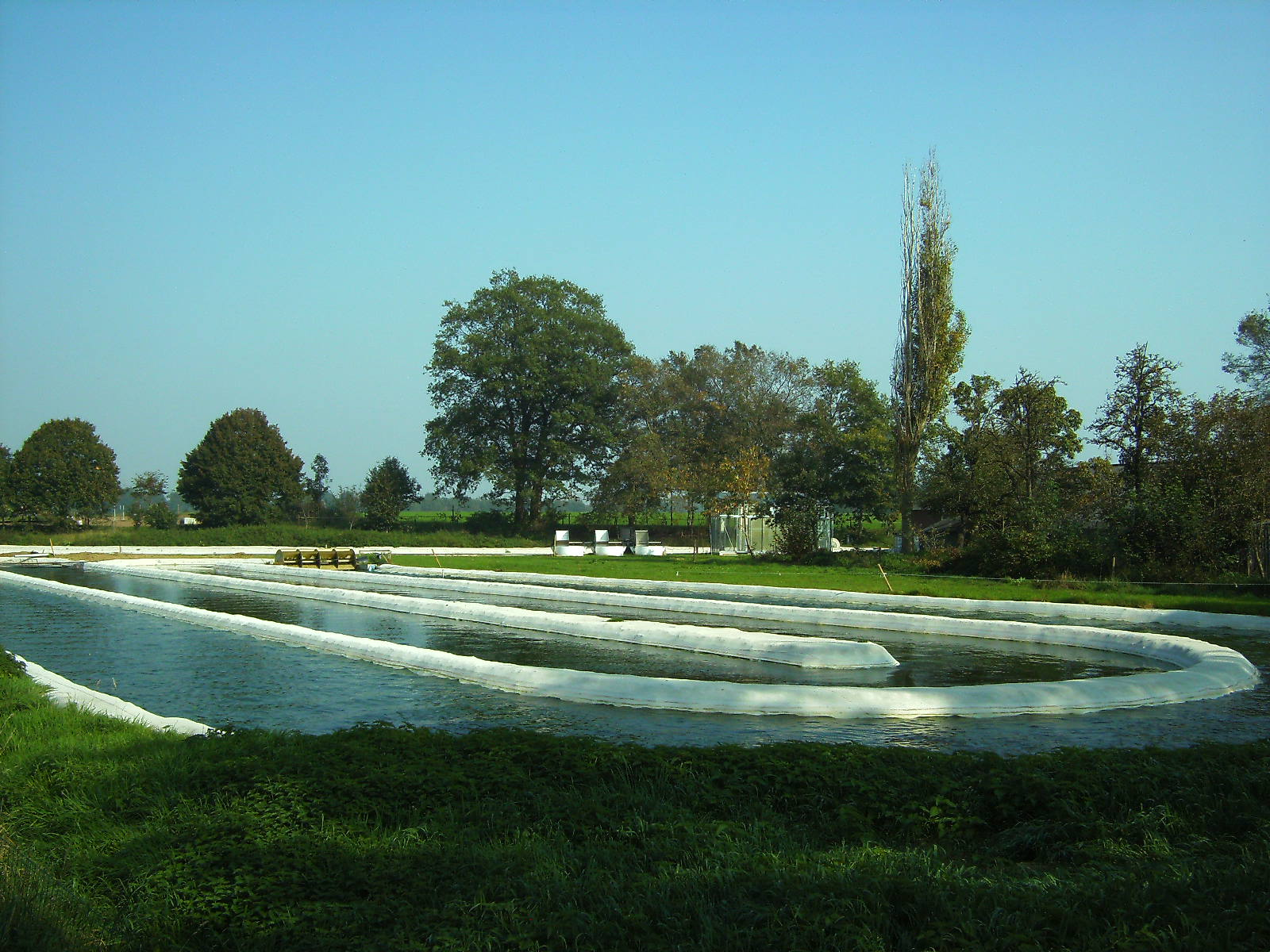
Raceway pond used for the cultivation of microalgae. The water is kept in constant motion with a powered paddle wheel.

A raceway pond is a shallow artificial pond used in the cultivation of algae.

The pond is divided into a rectangular grid, with each rectangle containing one channel in the shape of an oval, like an automotive raceway circuit. From above, many ponds look like a maze. Each rectangle contains a paddle wheel to make the water flow continuously around the circuit.

The Department of Energy's Aquatic Species Program experimented with raceway ponds for the cultivation of algae. Many commercial producers of spirulina still use raceway ponds as their primary method of cultivation. Raceway ponds were used for removal of lead from waste water using biosorption by Spirulina (Arthospira) sp.

== See also ==
- Algaculture
- Algae
- Aquaculture
- Aquatic Species Program
- Microbiofuels
- Pond
- Raceway (aquaculture)
