= Glow plate =

Glow plates are sheets of glass or plastic that "glow" when light is supplied to one of their edges. The light source for a glow plate can be artificial, such as fluorescent light, or natural, with sunlight being directly exposed to the plate or fed through a fiber-optic system.

A joint effort between Florida State University and Oak Ridge National Laboratory is focused on the design of a "spiral bio-reactor light sheet", which consists of a plexiglas sheet that has been micro-etched on one side and rolled into a spiral shape.

Aside from aesthetic or utilitarian lighting purposes, much interest in using glow plates as a source of light comes from recent developments in algal cultivation.
