= SERI microalgae culture collection =

The SERI microalgae culture collection was a collection from the Department of Energy's Aquatic Species Program cataloged at the Solar Energy Research Institute located in Golden, Colorado. The Aquatic Species Program ended in 1996 after its funding was cut, at which point its microalgae collection was moved to the University of Hawaii. In 1998 the University of Hawaii, partnered with the University of California at Berkeley, received a grant from the National Science Foundation (NSF), for their proposal to develop commercial, medical, and industrial uses of microalgae, as well as new and more efficient techniques for cultivation. This grant was used to form Marine Bioproduct Engineering Center (MarBEC), a facility operating within the university system of Hawaii at Manoa, but connected to corporate interests.

Below is a list of the algal-strains in the microalgae culture collection from the closeout report of the Department of Energy's Aquatic Species Program.

| Strain | Species | Class |
|---|---|---|
| ACHNA1 | Achnanthes orientalis | Bacillariophyceae |
| ACHNA2 | Achnanthes orientalis | Bacillariophyceae |
| AMPHO1 | Amphora coffeiformis | Bacillariophyceae |
| AMPHO2 | Amphora coffeiformis | Bacillariophyceae |
| AMPHO3 | Amphora coffeiformis | Bacillariophyceae |
| AMPHO5 | Amphora coffeiformis | Bacillariophyceae |
| AMPHO6 | Amphora coffeiformis | Bacillariophyceae |
| AMPHO7 | Amphora delicatissima capitata | Bacillariophyceae |
| AMPHO8 | Amphora coffeiformis punctata | Bacillariophyceae |
| AMPHO10 | Amphora delicatissima | Bacillariophyceae |
| AMPHO11 | Amphora coffeiformis | Bacillariophyceae |
| AMPHO12 | Amphora coffeiformis punctata | Bacillariophyceae |
| AMPHO13 | Amphora coffeiformis punctata | Bacillariophyceae |
| AMPHO14 | Amphora coffeiformis | Bacillariophyceae |
| AMPHO18 | Amphora coffeiformis | Bacillariophyceae |
| AMPHO21 | Amphora coffeiformis linea | Bacillariophyceae |
| AMPHO22 | Amphora coffeiformis | Bacillariophyceae |
| AMPHO23 | Amphora delicatissima | Bacillariophyceae |
| AMPHO24 | Amphora coffeiformis | Bacillariophyceae |
| AMPHO25 | Amphora sp. | Bacillariophyceae |
| AMPHO26 | Amphora coffeiformis tenuis | Bacillariophyceae |
| AMPHO28 | Amphora coffeiformis | Bacillariophyceae |
| AMPHO29 | Amphora coffeiformis | Bacillariophyceae |
| AMPHO30 | Amphora coffeiformis | Bacillariophyceae |
| AMPHO31 | Amphora coffeiformis | Bacillariophyceae |
| AMPHO32 | Amphora coffeiformis | Bacillariophyceae |
| AMPHO33 | Amphora delicatissima | Bacillariophyceae |
| AMPHO34 | Amphora coffeiformis | Bacillariophyceae |
| AMPHO35 | Amphora coffeiformis taylori | Bacillariophyceae |
| AMPHO36 | Amphora coffeiformis taylori | Bacillariophyceae |
| AMPHO37 | Amphora coffeiformis linea | Bacillariophyceae |
| AMPHO38 | Amphora delicatissima | Bacillariophyceae |
| AMPHO40 | Amphora delicatissima | Bacillariophyceae |
| AMPHO46 | Amphora sp. | Bacillariophyceae |
| ANKIS1 | Ankistrodesmus falcatus | Chlorophyceae |
| BOROD2 | Borodinella sp. | Chlorophyceae |
| BOTRY1 | Botryococcus braunii | Chlorophyceae |
| CARB | --- | --- |
| CHAET1 | Chaetoceros muelleri | Bacillariophyceae |
| CHAET3 | Chaetoceros gracilis | Bacillariophyceae |
| CHAET5 | Chaetoceros muelleri | Bacillariophyceae |
| CHAET6 | Chaetoceros muelleri | Bacillariophyceae |
| CHAET7 | Chaetoceros muelleri | Bacillariophyceae |
| CHAET9 | Chaetoceros muelleri | Bacillariophyceae |
| CHAET10 | Chaetoceros muelleri | Bacillariophyceae |
| CHAET11 | Chaetoceros muelleri | Bacillariophyceae |
| CHAET14 | Chaetoceros muelleri | Bacillariophyceae |
| CHAET15 | Chaetoceros muelleri | Bacillariophyceae |
| CHAET17 | Chaetoceros muelleri | Bacillariophyceae |
| CHAET18 | Chaetoceros muelleri | Bacillariophyceae |
| CHAET19 | Chaetoceros muelleri | Bacillariophyceae |
| CHAET20 | Chaetoceros muelleri | Bacillariophyceae |
| CHAET21 | Chaetoceros muelleri | Bacillariophyceae |
| CHAET22 | Chaetoceros muelleri | Bacillariophyceae |
| CHAET23 | Chaetoceros muelleri | Bacillariophyceae |
| CHAET24 | Chaetoceros muelleri | Bacillariophyceae |
| CHAET30 | Chaetoceros sp. | Bacillariophyceae |
| CHAET39 | Chaetoceros muelleri | Bacillariophyceae |
| CHAET40 | Chaetoceros muelleri | Bacillariophyceae |
| CHAET41 | Chaetoceros muelleri | Bacillariophyceae |
| CHAET43 | Chaetoceros muelleri | Bacillariophyceae |
| CHAET44 | Chaetoceros muelleri | Bacillariophyceae |
| CHAET45 | Chaetoceros muelleri | Bacillariophyceae |
| CHAET46 | Chaetoceros muelleri | Bacillariophyceae |
| CHAET47 | Chaetoceros muelleri | Bacillariophyceae |
| CHAET48 | Chaetoceros muelleri | Bacillariophyceae |
| CHAET50 | Chaetoceros muelleri | Bacillariophyceae |
| CHAET51 | Chaetoceros muelleri | Bacillariophyceae |
| CHAET54 | Chaetoceros muelleri subsalsum | Bacillariophyceae |
| CHAET55 | Chaetoceros muelleri subsalsum | Bacillariophyceae |
| CHAET57 | Chaetoceros muelleri-trans | Bacillariophyceae |
| CHAET58 | Chaetoceros muelleri muelleri | Bacillariophyceae |
| CHAET59 | Chaetoceros muelleri subsalsum | Bacillariophyceae |
| CHAET60 | Chaetoceros muelleri subsalsum | Bacillariophyceae |
| CHAET62 | Chaetoceros muelleri subsalsum | Bacillariophyceae |
| CHAET64 | Chaetoceros muelleri subsalsum | Bacillariophyceae |
| CHAET66 | Chaetoceros muelleri | Bacillariophyceae |
| CHAET67 | Chaetoceros sp. | Bacillariophyceae |
| CHAET68 | Chaetoceros sp. | Bacillariophyceae |
| CHAET69 | Chaetoceros sp. | Bacillariophyceae |
| CHAET73 | Chaetoceros sp. | Bacillariophyceae |
| CHAET75 | Chaetoceros sp. | Bacillariophyceae |
| CHAET76 | Chaetoceros sp. | Bacillariophyceae |
| CHAET78 | Chaetoceros sp. | Bacillariophyceae |
| CHLOC1 | Chlorococcum sp. | Chlorophyceae |
| CHLOC2 | Chlorococcum sp. | Chlorophyceae |
| CHLOC3 | Chlorococcum sp. | Chlorophyceae |
| CHLOC6 | Chlorococcum sp. | Chlorophyceae |
| CHLOC7 | Chlorococcum sp. | Chlorophyceae |
| CHLOC8 | Chlorococcum sp. | Chlorophyceae |
| CHLOC10 | Chlorococcum sp. | Chlorophyceae |
| CHLOC11 | Chlorococcum sp. | Chlorophyceae |
| CHLOR1 | Chlorella sp. | Chlorophyceae |
| CHLOR2 | Chlorella ellipsoidea | Chlorophyceae |
| CHLOR3 | Chlorella sp. | Chlorophyceae |
| CHLOR5 | Chlorella sp. | Chlorophyceae |
| CHLOR6 | Chlorella sp. | Chlorophyceae |
| CHLOR8 | Chlorella sp. | Chlorophyceae |
| CHLOR9 | Chlorella sp. | Chlorophyceae |
| CHLOR10 | Chlorella sp. | Chlorophyceae |
| CHLOR11 | Chlorella sp. | Chlorophyceae |
| CHLOR12 | Chlorella sp. | Chlorophyceae |
| CHLOR13 | Chlorella sp. | Chlorophyceae |
| CHLOR14 | Chlorella salina | Chlorophyceae |
| CHLOR15 | Chlorella salina | Chlorophyceae |
| CHLOR16 | Chlorella sp. | Chlorophyceae |
| CHLOR17 | Chlorella sp. | Chlorophyceae |
| CHLOR18 | Chlorella sp. | Chlorophyceae |
| CHLOR20 | Chlorella sp. | Chlorophyceae |
| CHLOR24 | Chlorella sp. | Chlorophyceae |
| CHLOR27 | Chlorella sp. | Chlorophyceae |
| CHOOC3 | (Chlorococcales) | Chlamydophyceae |
| CHOOC4 | (Chlorococcales) | Chlamydophyceae |
| CHOOC5 | (Chlorococcales) | Chlamydophyceae |
| CHOOC7 | (Chlorococcales) | Chlamydophyceae |
| CHOOC8 | (Chlorococcales) | Chlamydophyceae |
| CHOOC10 | (Chlorococcales) | Chlamydophyceae |
| CHOOC13 | (Chlorococcales) | Chlamydophyceae |
| CHOOC14 | (Chlorococcales) | Chlamydophyceae |
| CHOOC16 | (Chlorococcales) | Chlamydophyceae |
| CHROO1 | Chroomonas sp. | Bacillariophyceae |
| CHRYS1 | Chrysosphaera sp. | Bacillariophyceae |
| CHRYS2 | Sarcinoid chrysophyte | Bacillariophyceae |
| CRICO1 | Cricosphaera sp. | Bacillariophyceae |
| CRYPT1 | Cryptomonas sp. | Bacillariophyceae |
| CYCLO1 | Cyclotella cryptica | Bacillariophyceae |
| CYCLO6 | Cyclotella cryptica | Bacillariophyceae |
| CYCLO8 | Cyclotella meneghiniana | Bacillariophyceae |
| CYCLO9 | Cyclotella meneghiniana | Bacillariophyceae |
| CYCLO10 | Cyclotella sp. | Bacillariophyceae |
| CYCLO11 | Cyclotella cryptica | Bacillariophyceae |
| DIATO1 | Navicula sp. nov | Bacillariophyceae |
| DUNAL1 | Dunaliella sp. | Bacillariophyceae |
| DUNAL2 | Dunaliella sp. | Bacillariophyceae |
| ELLIP1 | Ellipsoidon sp. | Eustigmatophyceae |
| ENTOM1 | Amphiprora hyalina | Bacillariophyceae |
| EUSTI1 | (Eustigmatophyte) | Eustigmatophyceae |
| EUSTI2 | (Eustigmatophyte) | Eustigmatophyceae |
| EUSTI3 | (Eustigmatophyte) | Eustigmatophyceae |
| EUSTI5 | (Eustigmatophyte) | Eustigmatophyceae |
| EUSTI6 | (Eustigmatophyte) | Eustigmatophyceae |
| EUSTI7 | (Eustigmatophyte) | Eustigmatophyceae |
| EUSTI8 | (Eustigmatophyte) | Eustigmatophyceae |
| EUSTI9 | (Eustigmatophyte) | Eustigmatophyceae |
| EUSTI10 | (Eustigmatophyte) | Eustigmatophyceae |
| EUSTI11 | (Eustigmatophyte) | Eustigmatophyceae |
| EUSTI12 | (Eustigmatophyte) | Eustigmatophyceae |
| EUSTI13 | (Eustigmatophyte) | Eustigmatophyceae |
| EUSTI14 | (Eustigmatophyte) | Eustigmatophyceae |
| EUSTI15 | (Eustigmatophyte) | Eustigmatophyceae |
| EUSTI16 | (Eustigmatophyte) | Eustigmatophyceae |
| EUSTI17 | (Eustigmatophyte) | Eustigmatophyceae |
| EUSTI18 | (Eustigmatophyte) | Eustigmatophyceae |
| EUSTI19 | (Eustigmatophyte) | Eustigmatophyceae |
| EUSTI20 | (Eustigmatophyte) | Eustigmatophyceae |
| EUSTI21 | (Eustigmatophyte) | Eustigmatophyceae |
| EUSTI22 | (Eustigmatophyte) | Eustigmatophyceae |
| EUSTI23 | (Eustigmatophyte) | Eustigmatophyceae |
| FLAGE1 | Flagellate | --- |
| FLAGE2 | Unknown flagellate | --- |
| FLAGE3 | Pleurochrysis sp. | --- |
| FLAGE6 | Green Flagellate | --- |
| FRANC1 | Franceia sp. | Chlorophyceae |
| GLECA2 | Gleocapsa sp. | Cyanophyceae |
| GLOEO1 | Gloeothamnion sp. | --- |
| GREEN1 | Green unicell | --- |
| GREEN2 | Green unicell | --- |
| GREEN4 | Green coccoid | --- |
| GREEN6 | Green coccoid | --- |
| GREEN7 | Green coccoid | --- |
| GREEN8 | Unknown green coccoid | --- |
| GREEN9 | Unknown green coccoid | --- |
| GREEN10 | Unknown green coccoid | --- |
| GREEN11 | Unknown green coccoid | --- |
| HYMEN2 | Hymenomonas sp. | Prymnesiophyceae |
| ISOCH1 | Isochrysis aff. galbana | Prymnesiophyceae |
| MONOR1 | Monoraphidium sp. | Chlorophyceae |
| MONOR2 | Monoraphidium sp. | Chlorophyceae |
| MONOR3 | Monoraphidium sp. | Chlorophyceae |
| MONOR4 | Monoraphidium minutum | Chlorophyceae |
| NANNO2 | Nannochloris sp. | Chlorophyceae |
| NANNO3 | Nannochloris sp. | Chlorophyceae |
| NANNO5 | Nannochloris sp. | Chlorophyceae |
| NANNO7 | Nannochloris sp. | Chlorophyceae |
| NANNO8 | Nannochloris sp. | Chlorophyceae |
| NANNO9 | Nannochloris sp. | Chlorophyceae |
| NANNO10 | Nannochloris sp. | Chlorophyceae |
| NANNO12 | Nannochloris sp. | Chlorophyceae |
| NANNO13 | Nannochloris sp. | Chlorophyceae |
| NANNP1 | Nannochloropsis salina | Eustigmatophyceae |
| NANNP2 | Nannochloropsis sp. | Eustigmatophyceae |
| NAVIC1 | Navicula saprophila | Bacillariophyceae |
| NAVIC2 | Navicula saprophila | Bacillariophyceae |
| NAVIC3 | Navicula saprophila | Bacillariophyceae |
| NAVIC5 | Navicula saprophila | Bacillariophyceae |
| NAVIC7 | Navicula saprophila | Bacillariophyceae |
| NAVIC9 | Navicula pseudotenelloides | Bacillariophyceae |
| NAVIC10 | Navicula biskanterae | Bacillariophyceae |
| NAVIC12 | Navicula acceptata | Bacillariophyceae |
| NAVIC13 | Navicula saprophila | Bacillariophyceae |
| NAVIC14 | Navicula pseudotenelloides | Bacillariophyceae |
| NAVIC15 | Navicula pseudotenelloides | Bacillariophyceae |
| NAVIC16 | Navicula pseudotenelloides | Bacillariophyceae |
| NAVIC17 | Navicula pseudotenelloides | Bacillariophyceae |
| NAVIC20 | Navicula pseudotenelloides | Bacillariophyceae |
| NAVIC21 | Navicula pseudotenelloides | Bacillariophyceae |
| NAVIC22 | Navicula saprophila | Bacillariophyceae |
| NAVIC23 | Navicula saprophila | Bacillariophyceae |
| NAVIC24 | Navicula saprophila | Bacillariophyceae |
| NAVIC26 | Navicula saprophila | Bacillariophyceae |
| NAVIC28 | Navicula saprophila | Bacillariophyceae |
| NAVIC31 | Navicula acceptata | Bacillariophyceae |
| NAVIC32 | Navicula acceptata | Bacillariophyceae |
| NAVIC33 | Navicula pseudotenelloides | Bacillariophyceae |
| NAVIC35 | Navicula acceptata | Bacillariophyceae |
| NEPHC1 | Nephrochloris sp. | --- |
| NEPHR1 | Nephroselmis sp. | --- |
| NITZS1 | Nitzschia pusilla monoensis | Bacillariophyceae |
| NITZS3 | Nitzschia pusilla elliptica | Bacillariophyceae |
| NITZS4 | Nitzschia alexandrina | Bacillariophyceae |
| NITZS5 | Nitzschia quadrangula | Bacillariophyceae |
| NITZS6 | Nitzschia pusilla monoensis | Bacillariophyceae |
| NITZS7 | Nitzschia quadrangula | Bacillariophyceae |
| NITZS9 | Nitzschia inconspicua | Bacillariophyceae |
| NITZS10 | Nitzschia microcephala | Bacillariophyceae |
| NITZS12 | Nitzschia pusilla | Bacillariophyceae |
| NITZS13 | Nitzschia dissipata | Bacillariophyceae |
| NITZS14 | Nitzschia communis | Bacillariophyceae |
| NITZS17 | Nitzschia hantzschiana | Bacillariophyceae |
| NITZS19 | Nitzschia inconspicua | Bacillariophyceae |
| NITZS20 | Nitzschia inconspicua | Bacillariophyceae |
| NITZS23 | Nitzschia intermedia | Bacillariophyceae |
| NITZS24 | Nitzschia hantzschiana | Bacillariophyceae |
| NITZS30 | Nitzschia hantzschiana | Bacillariophyceae |
| NITZS35 | Nitzschia inconspicua | Bacillariophyceae |
| NITZS37 | Nitzschia pusilla | Bacillariophyceae |
| NITZS38 | Nitzschia pusilla | Bacillariophyceae |
| NITZS39 | Nitzschia pusilla | Bacillariophyceae |
| NITZS40 | Nitzschia pusilla | Bacillariophyceae |
| NITZS43 | Nitzschia pusilla | Bacillariophyceae |
| NITZS44 | Nitzschia frustulum | Bacillariophyceae |
| NITZS45 | Nitzschia inconspicua | Bacillariophyceae |
| NITZS49 | Nitzschia sp. | Bacillariophyceae |
| OCHRO2 | Ochromonas sp. | Chrysophyceae |
| OOCYS1 | Oocystis pusilla | Chlorophyceae |
| OOCYS3 | Oocystis parva | Chlorophyceae |
| OOCYS5 | Oocystis sp. | Chlorophyceae |
| OOCYS9 | Oocystis sp. | Chlorophyceae |
| OOCYS11 | Oocystis sp. | Chlorophyceae |
| OOCYS14 | Oocystis sp. | Chlorophyceae |
| OSCIL1 | Oscillatoria limnetica | Cyanophyceae |
| OSCIL3 | Oscillatoria subbrevis | Cyanophyceae |
| OSCIL8 | Oscillatoria sp. | Cyanophyceae |
| OSCIL9 | Oscillatoria sp. | Cyanophyceae |
| OSCIL10 | Oscillatoria sp. | Cyanophyceae |
| OSCIL11 | Oscillatoria sp. | Cyanophyceae |
| OSCIL12 | Oscillatoria sp. | Cyanophyceae |
| OSCIL13 | Oscillatoria sp. | Cyanophyceae |
| OSCIL14 | Oscillatoria sp. | Cyanophyceae |
| OSCIL15 | Oscillatoria sp. | Cyanophyceae |
| PAVLO2 | Pavlova sp. | Chrysophyceae |
| PHAEO1 | Phaeodactylum tricornutum | Bacillariophyceae |
| PHAEO2 | Phaeodactylum tricornutum | Bacillariophyceae |
| PLATY1 | Platymonas sp. | Chlorophyceae |
| PLEUR1 | Pleurochrysis dentata | Prymnesiophyceae |
| PLEUR4 | Pleurochrysis dentata | Prymnesiophyceae |
| PLEUR5 | Pleurochrysis sp. | Prymnesiophyceae |
| PLEUR6 | Pleurochrysis sp. | Prymnesiophyceae |
| PRYMN2 | (Prymnesiophyte) | Prymnesiophyceae |
| PSEUD1 | Pseudoanabaena sp. | Cyanophyceae |
| PSEUD4 | --- | --- |
| PYRAM2 | Pyramimonas sp. | Prasinophyceae |
| STICH1 | Stichococcus sp. | Chlorophyceae |
| STICH2 | Stichococcus sp. | Chlorophyceae |
| SYNEC1 | Synechococcus sp. | Cyanophyceae |
| SYNEC3 | Synechococcus sp. | Cyanophyceae |
| SYNEC5 | Synechococcus sp. | Cyanophyceae |
| TETRA1 | Tetraselmis suecica | Prasinophyceae |
| TETRA2 | Tetraselmis sp. | Prasinophyceae |
| TETRA3 | Tetraselmis sp. | Prasinophyceae |
| TETRA4 | Tetraselmis sp. | Prasinophyceae |
| TETRA5 | Tetraselmis sp. | Prasinophyceae |
| TETRA6 | Tetraselmis sp. | Prasinophyceae |
| TETRA7 | Tetraselmis sp. | Prasinophyceae |
| TETRA8 | Tetraselmis sp. | Prasinophyceae |
| TETRA9 | Tetraselmis sp. | Prasinophyceae |
| TETRA11 | Tetraselmis sp. | Prasinophyceae |
| THALA6 | Thalassiosira weissflogii | Bacillariophyceae |
| THALA7 | Thalassiosira weissflogii | Bacillariophyceae |
| THALA14 | Thalassiosira weissflogii | Bacillariophyceae |
| THALA15 | Thalassiosira weissflogii | Bacillariophyceae |
| THALA16 | Thalassiosira weissflogii | Bacillariophyceae |
| UNKNO1 | --- | --- |
| UNKNO5 | Unknown olive-green unicell | |
| UNKNO6 | Unknown coccolithophorid | Prymnesiophyceae |
| UNKNO8 | Unknown coccolithophorid | Prymnesiophyceae |
| UNKNO10 | Nitzschia sp. | Bacillariophyceae |
| UNKNO24 | --- | --- |
| UNKNO36 | --- | --- |
| UNKNO52 | --- | Cyanophyceae |
| UNKNO58 | --- | --- |
| VW291 | --- | --- |
| UNKNO10 | Nitzschia sp. | Bacillariophyceae |
| UNKNO24 | --- | --- |
| UNKNO36 | --- | --- |
| UNKNO52 | --- | Cyanophyceae |
| UNKNO58 | --- | --- |
| VW291 | --- | --- |

== See also ==
- Algaculture
- List of algal culture collections
- Algal nutrient solutions
- Aquatic Species Program
