= Air filter =

Device which removes solid particulates from the air

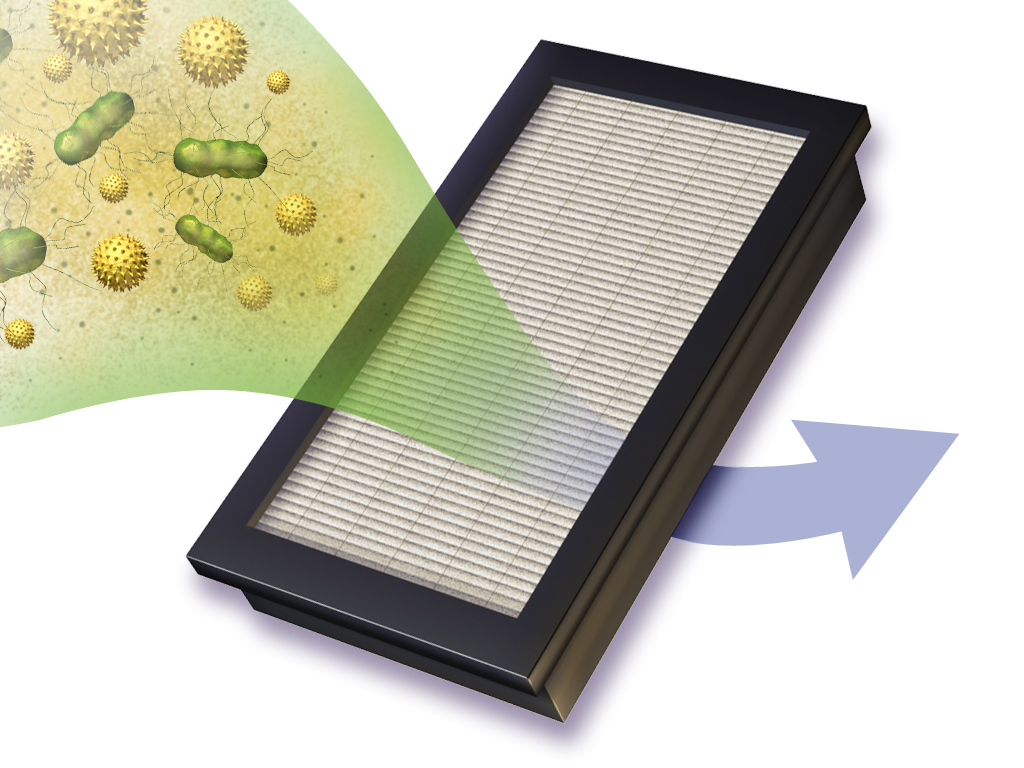
Diagram of a HEPA (high-efficiency particulate air) filter

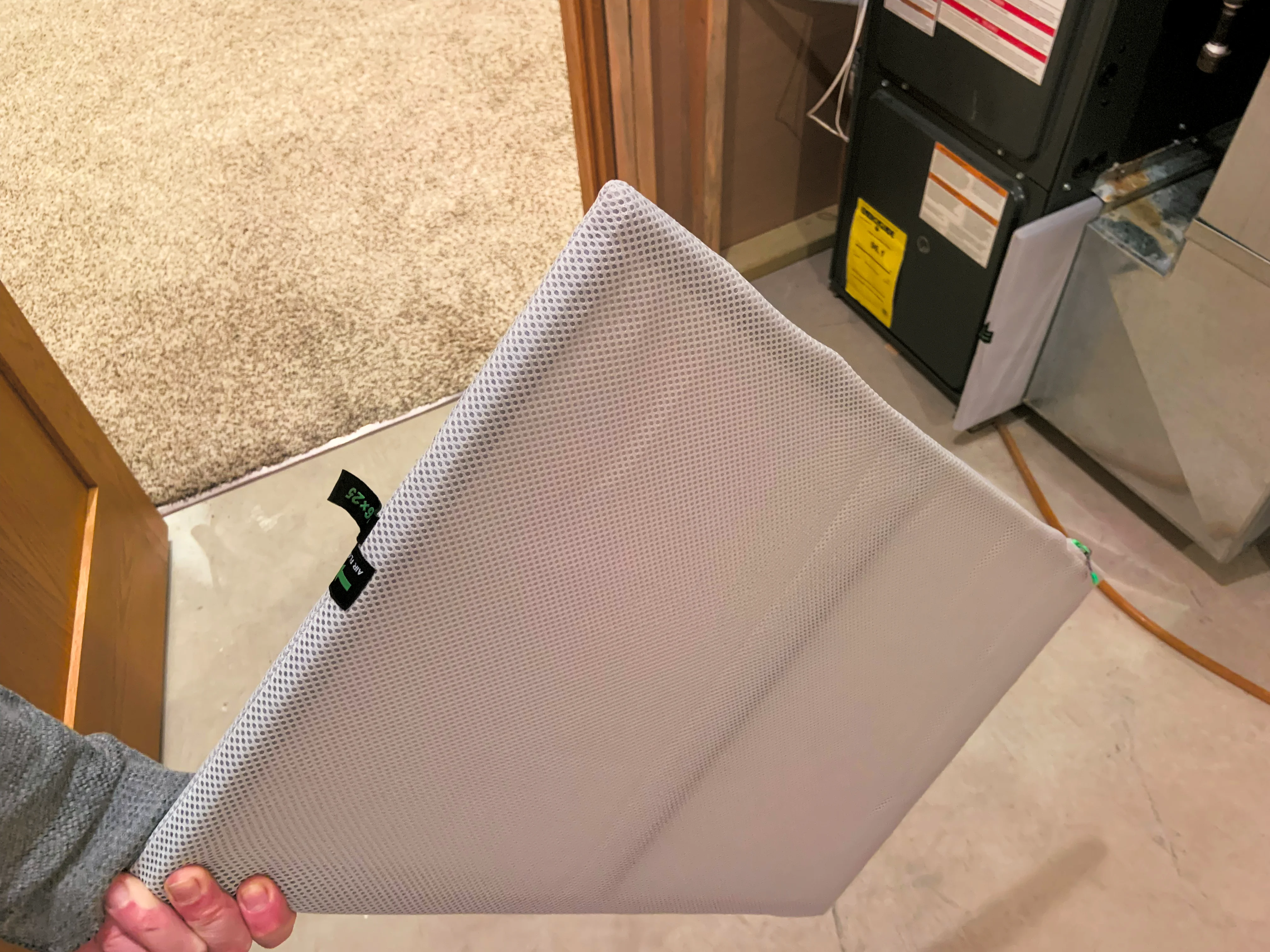
Reusable washable HVAC air filter

A particulate air filter is a device composed of fibrous or porous materials which removes particulates such as smoke, dust, pollen, mold, viruses, and bacteria from the air. Filters containing an adsorbent or catalyst such as charcoal (carbon) or baking sodamay also remove odors and gaseous pollutants, such as volatile organic compounds or ozone. Air filters are used in applications where air quality is important, notably in

- building ventilation systems
- engine, compressor, gas turbine compressor intakes
- equipment(autos, aircraft, construction) cabins.
- human-made environments (e.g., satellites, and Space Shuttles)

Air filters are typically constructed of foam, pleated paper, cotton, or spun fiberglass. Oil bath air filters have fallen out of favour aside from niche uses.

Air ionizers use a different method, static electric charge, than air filters to attract and remove dust particles but they may also be supplemented with an air filter.

== HEPA filters ==
High efficiency particulate arrester (HEPA), originally called high-efficiency particulate absorber but also sometimes called high-efficiency particulate arresting or high-efficiency particulate arrestance, is a type of air filter. Filters meeting the HEPA standard have many applications, including use in clean rooms for IC fabrication, medical facilities, automobiles, aircraft and homes. The filter must satisfy certain standards of efficiency such as those set by the United States Department of Energy (DOE).

Varying standards define what qualifies as a HEPA filter. The two most common standards EN 1822 and ASME AG-1 require an air filter must remove (from the air that passes through) 99.95% (European Standard) or 99.97% (ASME standard) of particles that have a size greater than or equal to 0.3 μm.

== Automotive cabin air filters ==
The cabin air filter, also known in the United Kingdom as a pollen filter, is typically a pleated filter that is placed in the outside-air intake for the vehicle's passenger compartment. Some of these filters are rectangular, while others are uniquely shaped to fit the available space of particular vehicles' outside-air intakes.

=== History ===
The first automaker to include a disposable filter to keep the ventilation system clean was the Nash Motors "Weather Eye", introduced in 1940.

A reusable heater core filter was available as an optional accessory on Studebaker models beginning in 1959, including Studebaker Lark automobiles (1959-1966), Studebaker Gran Turismo Hawk automobiles (1962-1964) and Studebaker Champ trucks (1960-1964). The filter was an aluminum frame containing an aluminum mesh and was located directly above the heater core. The filter was removed and installed from the engine compartment through a slot in the firewall. A long, thin rubber seal plugged the slot when the filter was installed. The filter could be vacuumed and washed prior to installation.

=== Performance ===
Clogged or dirty cabin air filters can reduce airflow available to the cabin vents, as well as introduce allergens into the cabin air stream. Since the cabin air temperature depends upon the flow rate of the air passing through the heater core, the evaporator, or both, clogged filters can greatly reduce the effectiveness and performance of the vehicle's air conditioning and heating systems.

At the point of retail to the consumer, cabin air filter suppliers do not share performance testing characteristics listed below. However, some cabin air filter manufacturers do print a minimum efficiency reporting value (MERV) filter rating or cite N95 (however disclaim any NIOSH compliance) on their cabin air filter retail boxes.

Air filters may combine up to five layers or more to achieve the desired MERV performance levels, at the expense of increased pressure drop for each additional layer added that may reduce the overall effectiveness and performance of the vehicle's air conditioning and heating systems if the blower motor is not capable of maintaining the airflow across the heat exchangers of the baseline designed air filter by increasing speed (and power).

Pleat spacing (inversely pleat count) of air filter media is inversely proportional to filtration efficiency.

Airflow and pressure drop of air filter media is inversely proportional to filtration efficiency.

== Construction ==
Air filters are constructed in various geometries and configurations, depending on the required airflow, filtration efficiency, pressure drop, and installation constraints.

Common constructions include:

- Pleated filters, in which the filter medium is folded to increase its effective surface area within a given filter face area.
- Wound tubular filters, in which fibrous material is wound around a cylindrical core to form a tubular filtering element.
- V-shaped filters, in which filter elements are arranged in a V-shaped configuration to increase the filtration area within a compact form factor.

== Air filter performance testing ==
Air filters can be tested under controlled laboratory conditions to evaluate their performance independently of their application. ISO 5011:2025 specifies test procedures, conditions, equipment, and reporting requirements for comparing air cleaners used in internal combustion engines and compressors. Similar test methods are specified by ISO 10263-2 for engine air intake systems.

Common performance characteristics include:

- Airflow rate and pressure drop
- Dust collection efficiency, using standardized test dusts such as ISO 12103-1 A2 Fine or A4 Coarse
- Dust holding capacity, typically measured as the mass of dust collected at a specified terminal pressure drop
- Oil carry-over for oil-bath air cleaners

Visual inspection can also be used to assess the condition and visible contamination of filter media. Image processing and computer vision techniques have been investigated for automated assessment of contamination and particle accumulation.

== Internal combustion engine air filter ==
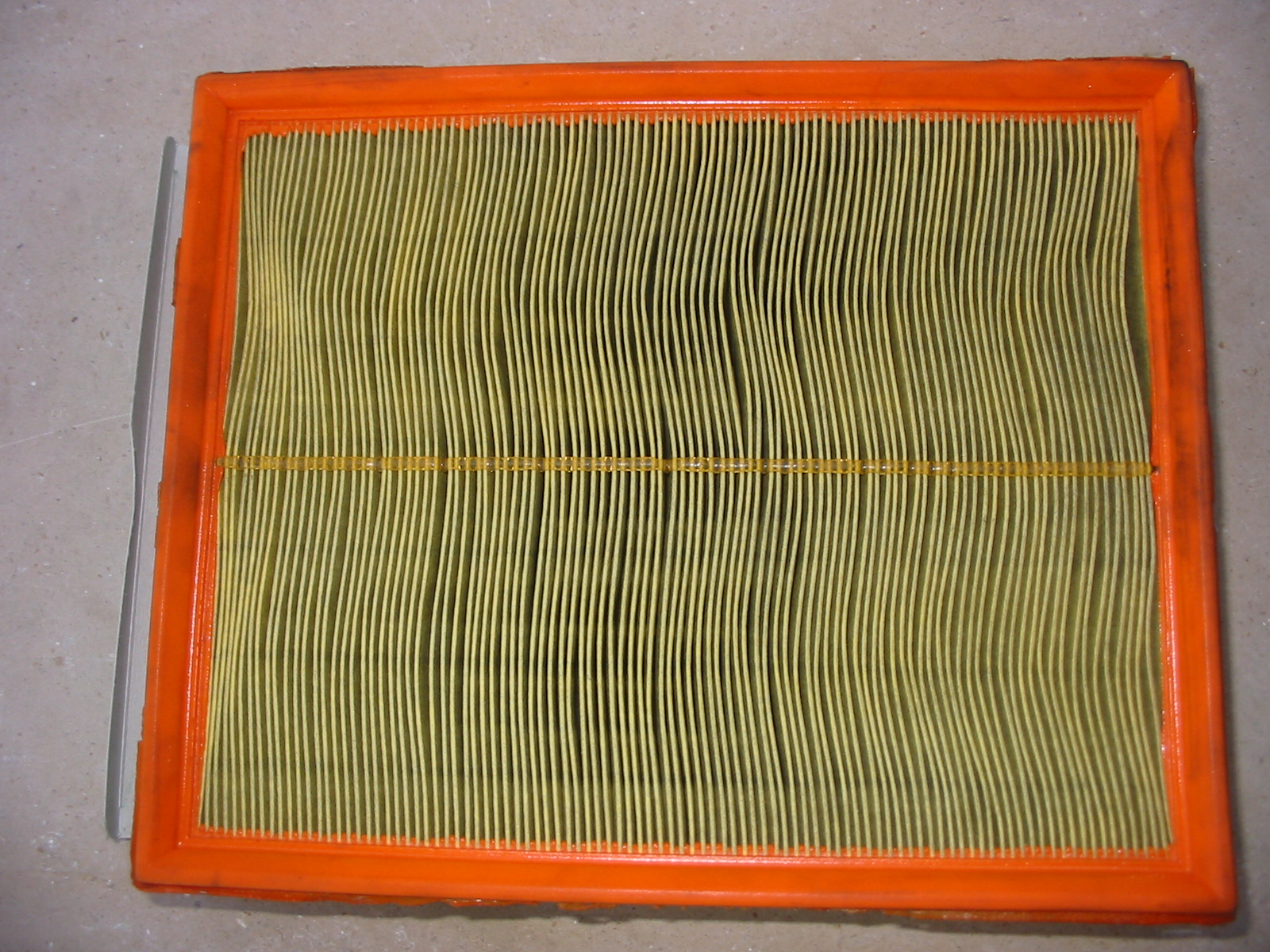
Used auto engine air filter, clean side

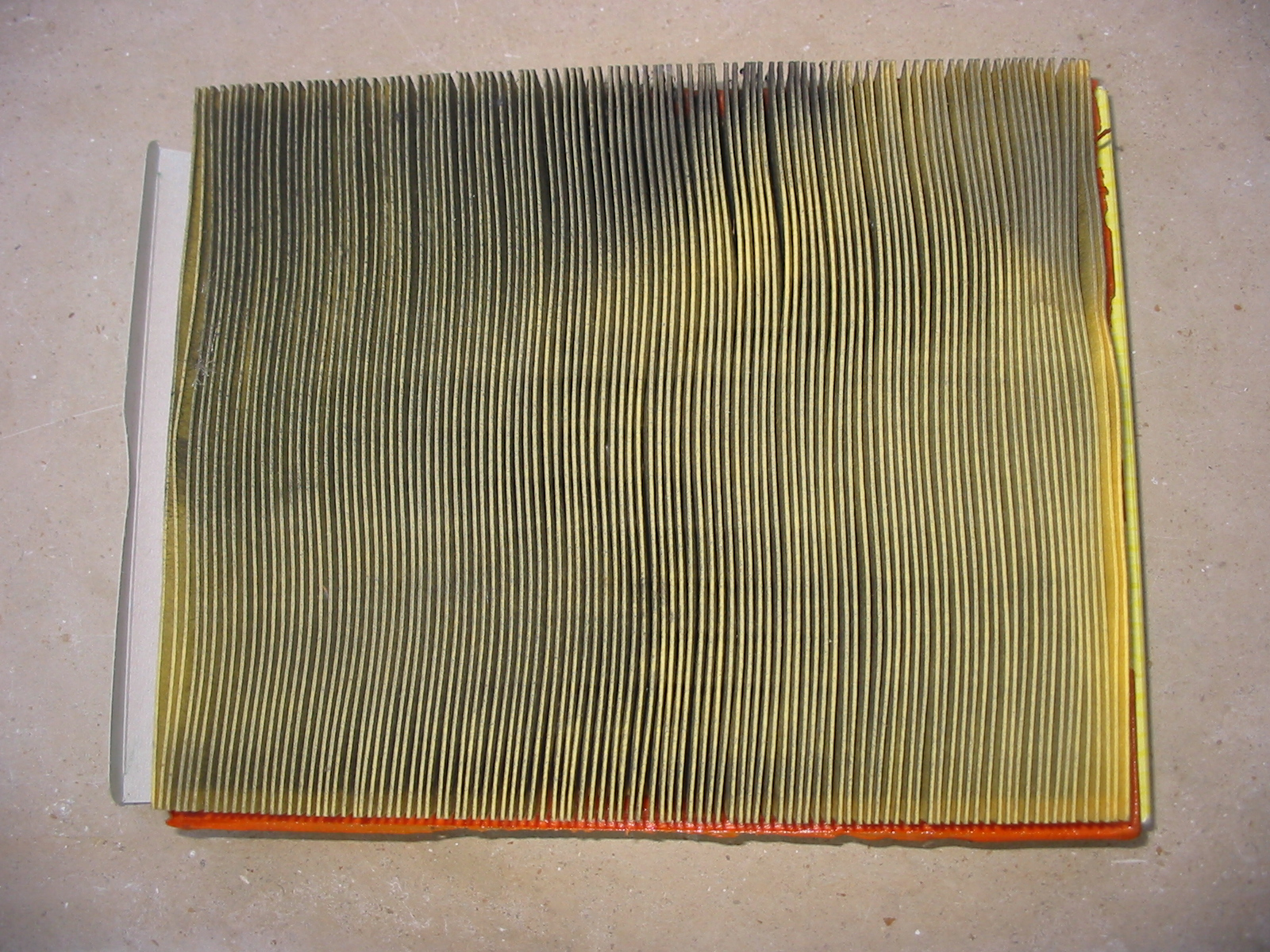
Used auto engine air filter, dirty side

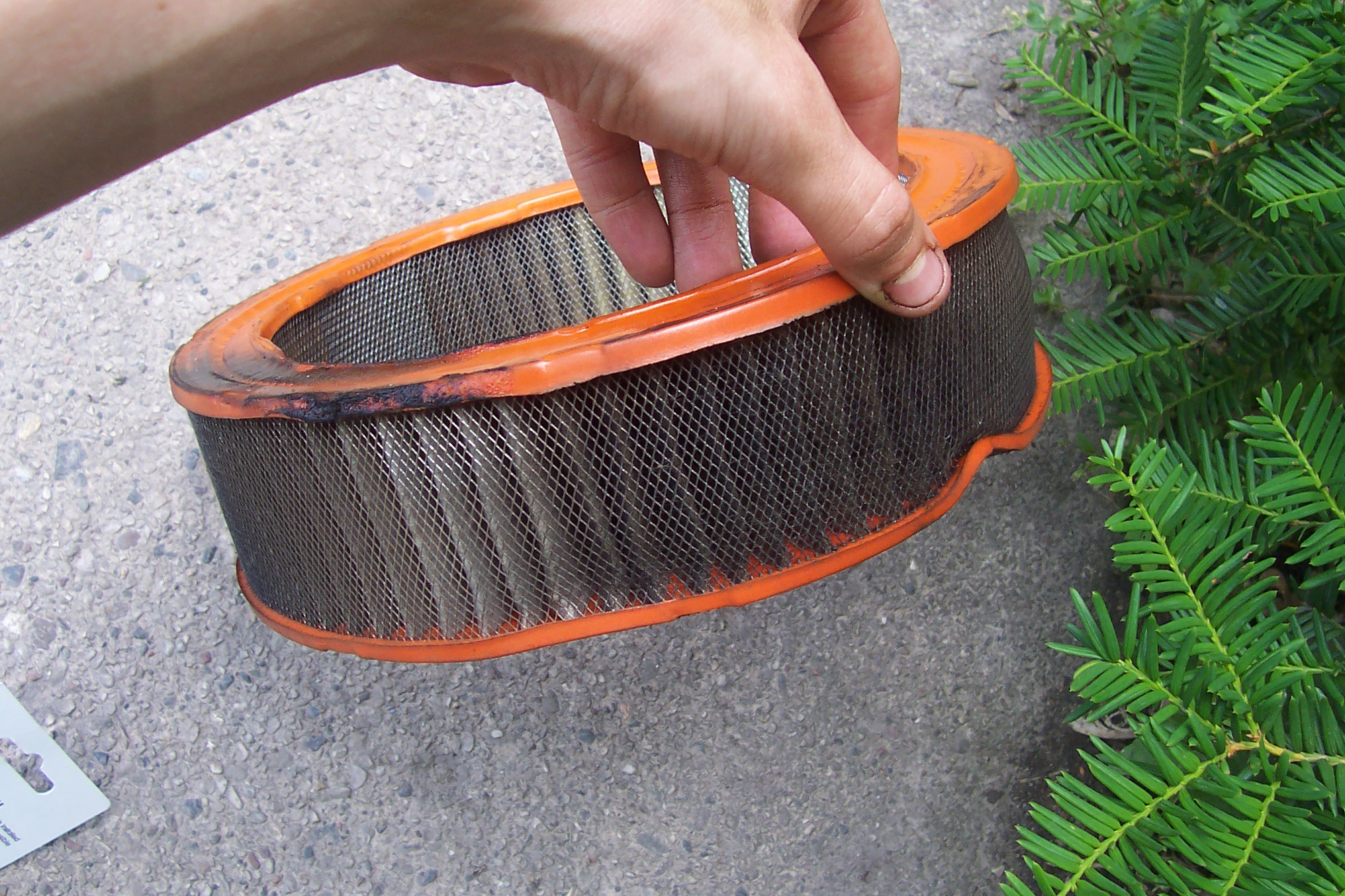
Auto engine air filter clogged with dust and grime

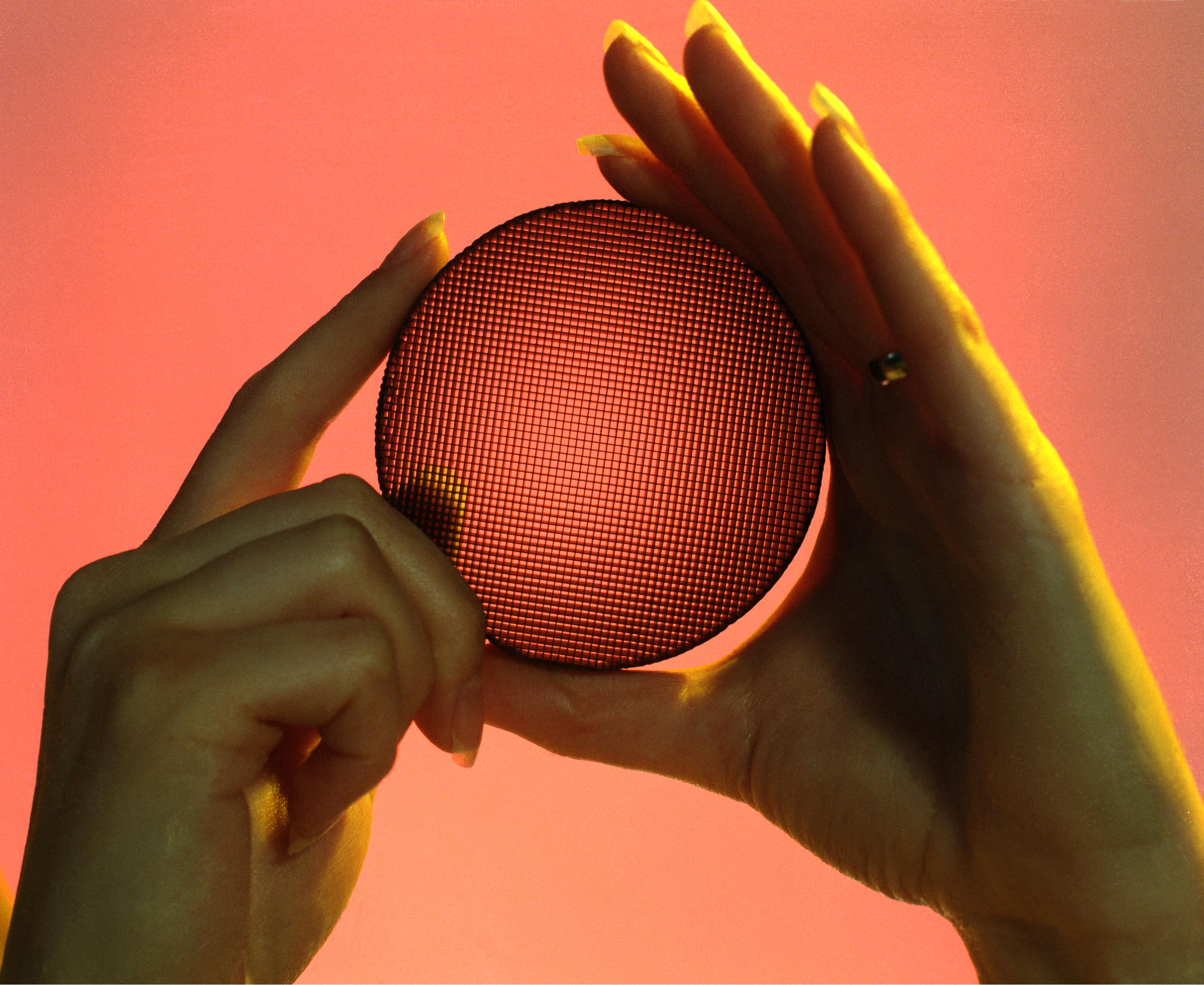
Low-temperature oxidation catalyst used to convert carbon monoxide to less toxic carbon dioxide at room temperature. It can also remove formaldehyde from the air.

The combustion air filter mounted inside the air cleaner housing and associated duct work connected to the engine intake throttle body prevents abrasive particulate matter from entering the engine's cylinders; which may cause mechanical wear, oil contamination, and change to emissions performance.

To indicate air filter clogging, a mechanical indicator or electronic transducer to note differential pressure may be installed; values of which that exceed the engine manufacturer's threshold (typically 5 - 8 kPa for standard duties) indicate the need to replace the clogged air filter impacting engine performance: higher BSFC, higher emissions, etc., and if further ignored may damage the engine.

=== Form Factors ===
Flat panel pleated air filters are primarily used in many modern fuel injected vehicles.

Cylindrical air filters, usually between 100 millimetres (4 in) and 400 millimetres (16 in) in diameter, were used in older vehicles with a carburetor or throttle-body fuel injection.

== Filter media types ==
Filter media can be made from the following typical construction methods:

- non-woven
- woven

Once constructed, the filter medial can have various surface modifications: embossing, etc. and treatments: anti-microbial, micro-electrostatic, etc. to improve filtration efficiency and reduce pressure drop.

Often, simulation tools can optimize filter media aerodynamics and fluid dynamics to increase overall efficiency in various applications: Air intake of gas turbine air-compressors.

=== Synthetic ===
Synthetic filter media types hold the largest market share in 2026. The synthetic material can be made of polyester (most common), polypropylene, polyethylene, or any number of high performance specialty fibers.

=== Fiberglass ===
Fiberglass filter media can be cost effective but has poor performance capturing small particles when compared to other filter media.

=== Activated Carbon ===
Activated carbon filter layers are usually combined with other filter media type layers. These filters can be used to filter out various airborne contaminants.

=== Cellulose / Paper ===
Pleated paper filter elements are the nearly exclusive choice for automobile engine air cleaners, because they are efficient, easy to service, and cost-effective. The "paper" term is somewhat misleading, as the paper filter media is constructed differently from papers used for writing or packaging, by employing binding resins or surface modifications. The paper is pleated/bent in a zig-zag shape to increase the filtration surface area of the paper encountered by the airflow path, in the range of 50 times that of the air opening.

There is a persistent belief among tuners, reinforced by advertising for aftermarket non-paper replacement filters manufacturers, that paper filters flow poorly enough to restrict engine performance. However, as long as a pleated-paper filter is sized appropriately for the airflow volumes encountered in a particular application, such filters present only a trivial restriction to flow and pressure drop until the filter has become significantly clogged with dirt.

=== Foam ===
Oil-wetted polyurethane foam elements are used in some aftermarket replacement automobile air filters. Foam was in the past widely used in air cleaners on small engines on lawnmowers and other power equipment, but automotive-type paper filter elements have largely supplanted oil-wetted foam in these applications. Foam filters are still commonly used on air compressors for air tools up to 5 horsepower (3.7 kW). Depending on the grade and thickness of foam employed, an oil-wetted foam filter element can offer minimal airflow restriction or very high dirt capacity, the latter property making foam filters a popular choice in off-road rallying and other motorsport applications where high levels of dust will be encountered. Due to the way dust is captured on foam filters, large amounts may be trapped without measurable change in airflow restriction.

=== Cotton ===
Oiled cotton gauze is employed in a growing number of aftermarket automotive air filters marketed as high-performance items. In the 1970's, with the introduction of the Fiat Abarth SS versions, cotton gauze air filters as OE automotive engine filters gained market traction.

=== Metal ===
Metal Mesh (stainless steel for rust resistance) is another example of an air filter media which can be ordered with different mesh counts to adjust for desired performance characteristics. In an extremely modified engine lacking the space for a cone-based air filter, some will opt to install a simple stainless steel mesh over the hot turbo to reduce certain particles sizes from entering the engine via the turbo.

Metal air filters are an exclusive solution for certain operating environments

- Hot (up to melting point of metal used)
- Harsh chemical

=== Fluid Bath ===
==== Oil ====
Oil bath air cleaners consist of a sump containing a pool of oil and an insert which is filled with fiber, mesh, foam, or another coarse filter media. The cleaner removes particles by adhering them to the oil-soaked filter media; as opposed to traditional filtration, the openings in the filter media are much larger than the particles that are to be filtered. When the cleaner is assembled, the media-containing body of the insert sits a short distance above the surface of the oil pool. The rim of the insert overlaps the rim of the sump. This arrangement forms a labyrinthine path through which the air must travel in a series of U-turns: up through the gap between the rims of the insert and the sump, down through the gap between the outer wall of the insert and the inner wall of the sump, and up through the filter media in the body of the insert. This U-turn takes the air at high velocity across the surface of the oil pool. Heavier (and typically larger) dust and dirt particles in the air cannot make the turn due to their inertia, so they fall into the oil and settle to the bottom of the base bowl. Lighter (and typically smaller) particles stick to the filtration media in the insert, which is wetted by oil droplets aspirated there by normal airflow. The constant aspiration of oil onto the filter media slowly carries most of the finer trapped particles downward and the oil drips back into the reservoir where the particles accumulate.

Oil bath air cleaners were very widely used in automotive and small engine applications until the widespread industry adoption of the paper filter in the early 1960s. Such cleaners are still used in off-road equipment where very high levels of dust are encountered, for oil bath air cleaners can sequester a great deal of dirt relative to their overall size without loss of filtration efficiency or airflow. However, the liquid oil makes cleaning and servicing such air cleaners messy and inconvenient, they must be relatively large to avoid excessive restriction at high airflow rates, and they tend to increase exhaust emissions of unburned hydrocarbons due to oil aspiration when used on spark-ignition engines.

==== Water ====
In the early 20th century (about 1900 to 1930), water bath air cleaners were used in some applications (cars, trucks, tractors, and portable and stationary engines). They worked on roughly the same principles as oil bath air cleaners. For example, the original Fordson tractor had a water bath air cleaner. By the 1940s, oil bath designs had displaced water bath designs because of better filtering performance.

== Bulk solids handling filters ==
Bulk solids handling involves the transport of solids (mechanical transport, pneumatic transport) which may be in a powder form. Many industries are handling bulk solids (mining industries, chemical industries, food industries) which requires the treatment of air streams escaping the process so that fine particles are not emitted, for regulatory reasons or economical reasons (loss of materials). As a consequence, air filters are positioned at many places in the process, especially at the reception of pneumatic conveying lines where the quantity of air is important and the load in fine particle quite important. Filters can also be placed at any point of air exchange in the process to avoid that pollutants enter the process, which is particularly true in pharmaceuticals and food industries. The physical phenomena involved in catching particles with a filter are mainly inertial and diffusional

== Filter classes ==
Under European normalization standards EN 779, the following filter classes were recognized:

Usage	Class	Performance	Performance test	Particulate size approaching 100% retention	Test Standard
Coarse filters (used as Primary)	G1	65%	Average value	>5 μm	BS EN779
Coarse filters (used as Primary)	G2	65–80%	Average value	>5 μm	BS EN779
Coarse filters (used as Primary)	G3	80–90%	Average value	>5 μm	BS EN779
Coarse filters (used as Primary)	G4	90%–	Average value	>5 μm	BS EN779
Fine filters (used as Secondary)	M5	40–60%	Average value	>5 μm	BS EN779
Fine filters (used as Secondary)	M6	60–80%	Average value	>2 μm	BS EN779
Fine filters (used as Secondary)	F7	80–90%	Average value	>2 μm	BS EN779
Fine filters (used as Secondary)	F8	90–95%	Average value	>1 μm	BS EN779
Fine filters (used as Secondary)	F9	95%–	Average value	>1 μm	BS EN779
Semi HEPA	E10	85%	Minimum value	>1 μm	BS EN1822
Semi HEPA	E11	95%	Minimum value	>0.5 μm	BS EN1822
Semi HEPA	E12	99.5%	Minimum value	>0.5 μm	BS EN1822
HEPA	H13	99.95%	Minimum value	>0.3 μm	BS EN1822
HEPA	H14	99.995%	Minimum value	>0.3 μm	BS EN1822
ULPA	U15	99.9995%	Minimum value	>0.3 μm	BS EN1822
ULPA	U16	99.99995%	Minimum value	>0.3 μm	BS EN1822
ULPA	U17	99.999995%	Minimum value	>0.3 μm	BS EN1822

European standard EN 779, on which the above table is based, remained in effect from 2012 to mid-2018, when it was replaced by ISO 16890.

== See also ==
- Air purifier
- Clean Air Delivery Rate
- CityTrees
- Corsi–Rosenthal Box
- Cyclonic separation
- Dehumidifier
- Diesel particulate filter
- Dust collector
- Humidifier
- Impingement filter
- Indoor air quality
- Mechanical filter (respirator)#Filtration standards
- Nose filter
- Pocket filter
- Respirator
- Scrubber
- Smog tower
- Swan neck duct
