= Liquid3 =

Clean energy photobioreactor project

- Founded: September 2021
- Founder: Ivan Spasojević
- Area served: Belgrade, Serbia
- Website: https://liquid3.rs/

Liquid 3 (also known as Liquid Trees) is a clean energy photobioreactor project designed to replace the function of trees in heavily polluted urban areas where planting and growing real vegetation is not viable.

The project was designed by the Institute for Multidisciplinary Research at the University of Belgrade. The United Nations Development Programme (UNDP) selected Liquid 3 as an "innovative" solution for "Climate Smart Urban Development," a project produced in partnership with Serbia's Ministry of Environmental Protection and the municipality of Stari Grad.

== Overview ==
The Liquid3 algal photobioreactor is powered by solar panels. The glass tank is embedded into a structure that acts as a bench and is outfitted with other utilities such as charging ports. Similar to other photobioreactors, air is sucked through a pressure pump and fed to the microalgae, with oxygen released as a byproduct. Additionally, the Liquid 3 bioreactor can filter out heavy metal contaminants in the air and contains a temperature regulation system in case external climate conditions become too extreme for the microalgae. The creator of the Liquid 3, Dr. Ivan Spasojevic, was motivated to install it in Belgrade due to the city's struggle with pollution.

== See also ==
- CityTrees
- Smog tower
