= Photobioreactor =

Bioreactor with a light source to grow photosynthetic microorganisms

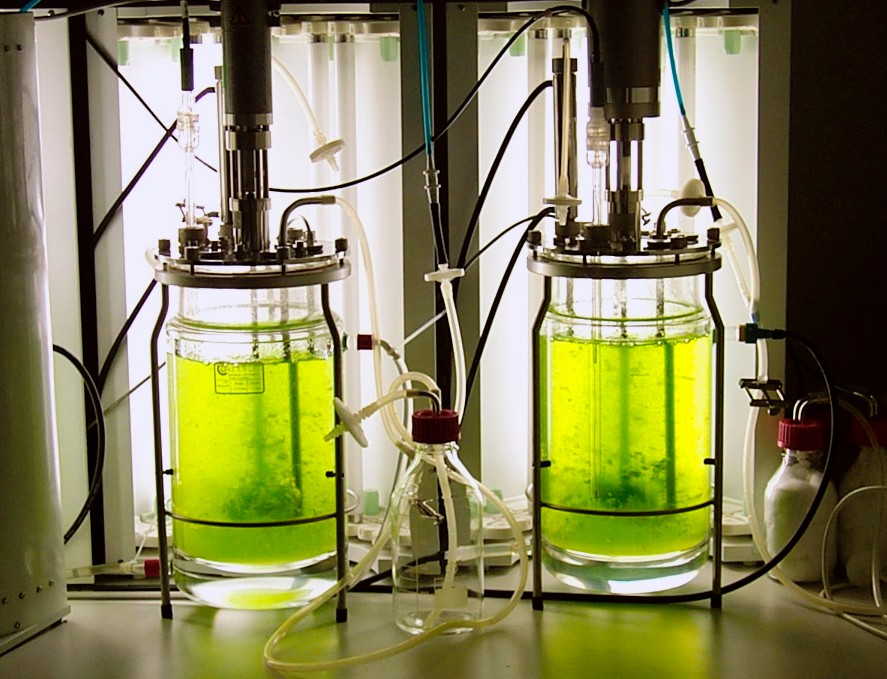
Moss photobioreactor to cultivate mosses like Physcomitrella patens at the laboratory scale

A photobioreactor (PBR) refers to any cultivation system designed for growing photoautotrophic organisms using artificial light sources or solar light to facilitate photosynthesis. Photobioreactors are typically used to cultivate microalgae, cyanobacteria, and some mosses. Photobioreactors can be open systems, such as raceway ponds, which rely upon natural sources of light and carbon dioxide. Closed photobioreactors are flexible systems that can be controlled to the physiological requirements of the cultured organism, resulting in optimal growth rates and purity levels. Photobioreactors are typically used for the cultivation of bioactive compounds for biofuels, pharmaceuticals, and other industrial uses.

== Open systems ==
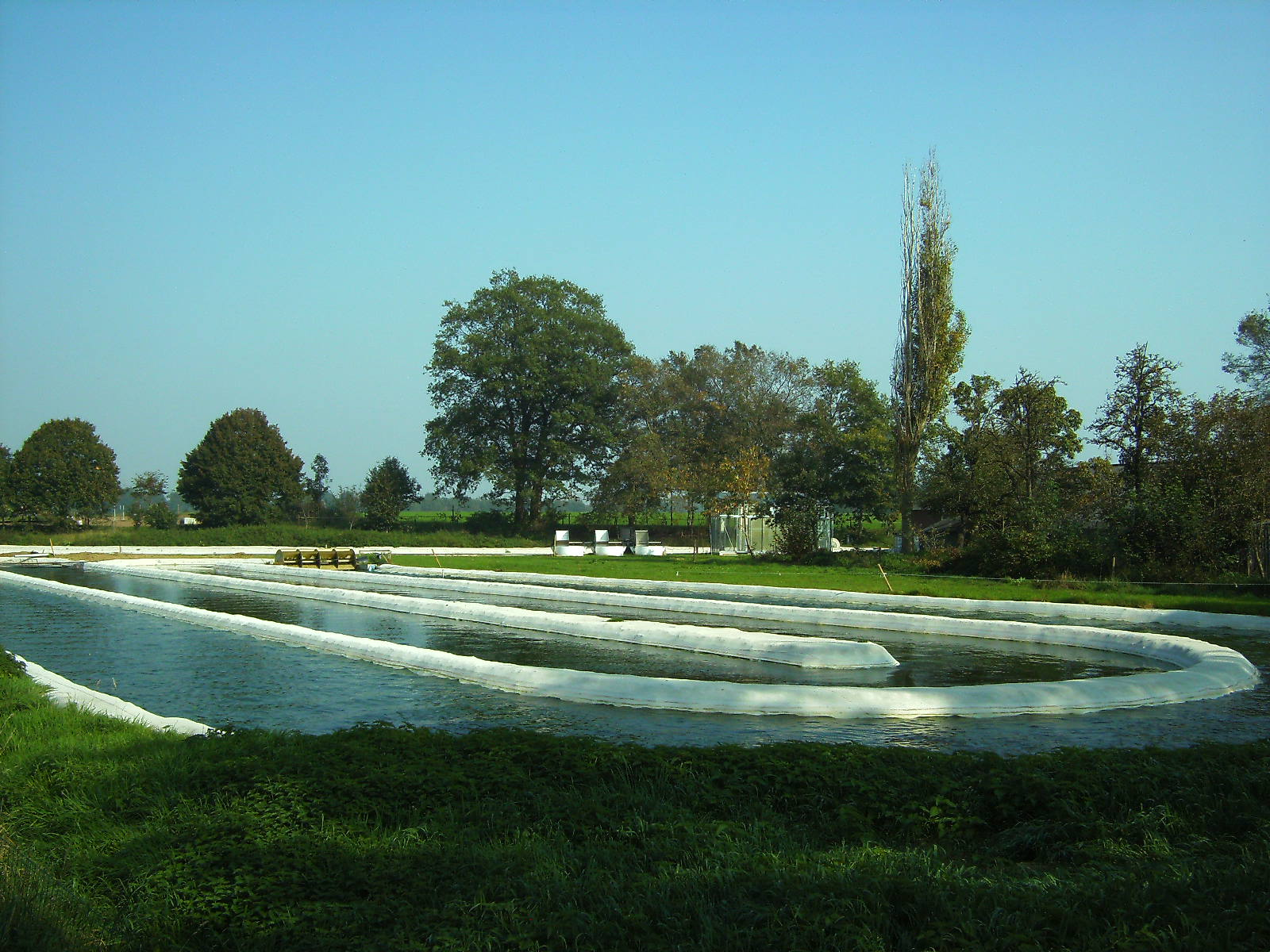
Open raceway pond

The first approach for the controlled production of phototrophic organisms was a natural open pond or artificial raceway pond. Therein, the culture suspension, which contains all necessary nutrients and carbon dioxide, is pumped around in a cycle, being directly illuminated from sunlight via the liquid's surface. Raceway ponds are still commonly used in industry due to their low operational cost in comparison to closed photobioreactors. However, they offer an insufficient control of reaction conditions due to their reliance on environmental light supply and carbon dioxide, as well as possible contamination from other microorganisms. Using open technologies also result in losses of water due to evaporation into the atmosphere.

== Closed systems ==
The construction of closed photobioreactors avoids system-related water losses and minimises contamination. Though closed systems have better productivity compared to open systems due to this, they still need to be improved to make them suitable for production of low price commodities as cell density remains low due to several limiting factors. All modern photobioreactors have tried to balance between a thin layer of culture suspension, optimized light application, low pumping energy consumption, capital expenditure and microbial purity. However, light attenuation and increased carbon dioxide requirements with growth are the two most inevitable changes in phototrophic cultures that severely limits productivity of photobioreactors. The accumulation of photosynthetic oxygen with growth of microalgae in photobioreactors is also believed to be a significant limiting factor; however, it has been recently shown with the help of kinetic models that dissolved oxygen levels as high as 400% air saturation are not inhibitory when cell density is high enough to attenuate light at later stages of microalgal cultures. Many different systems have been tested, but only a few approaches were able to perform at an industrial scale.

=== Redesigned laboratory fermenters ===
The simplest approach is the redesign of the well-known glass fermenters, which are state of the art in many biotechnological research and production facilities worldwide. The moss reactor for example shows a standard glass vessel, which is externally supplied with light. The existing head nozzles are used for sensor installation and for gas exchange. This type is quite common in laboratory scale, but it has never been established in bigger scale, due to its limited vessel size.

=== Tubular photobioreactors ===
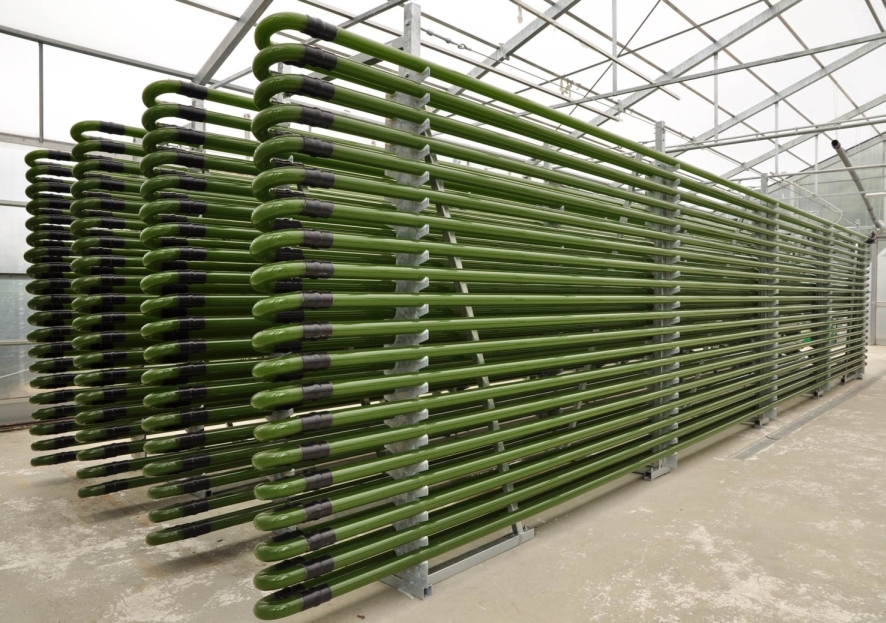
Tubular glass photobioreactor

Made from glass or plastic tubes, this photobioreactor type has succeeded within production scale. The tubes are oriented horizontally or vertically and are supplied from a central utilities installation with pump, sensors, nutrients and carbon dioxide. Tubular photobioreactors are established worldwide from laboratory up to production scale, e.g. for the production of the carotenoid Astaxanthine from the green algae Haematococcus pluvialis or for the production of food supplement from the green algae Chlorella vulgaris. These photobioreactors take advantage from the high purity levels and their efficient outputs. The biomass production can be done at a high quality level and the high biomass concentration at the end of the production allows energy efficient downstream processing. Due to the recent prices of the photobioreactors, economically feasible concepts today can only be found within high-value markets, e.g. food supplement or cosmetics.

The advantages of tubular photobioreactors at production scale are also transferred to laboratory scale. A combination of the mentioned glass vessel with a thin tube coil allows relevant biomass production rates at laboratory research scale. Being controlled by a complex process control system the regulation of the environmental conditions reaches a high level.

=== Christmas tree photobioreactor ===
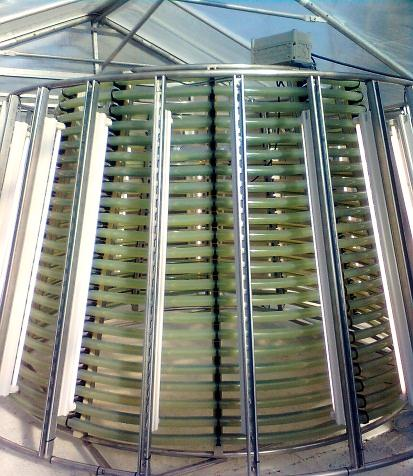
Christmas tree reactor

An alternative approach is shown by a photobioreactor, which is built in a tapered geometry and which carries a helically attached, translucent double hose circuit system. The result is a layout similar to a Christmas tree. The tubular system is constructed in modules and can theoretically be scaled outdoors up to agricultural scale. A dedicated location is not crucial, similar to other closed systems, and therefore non-arable land is suitable as well. The material choice should prevent biofouling and ensure high final biomass concentrations. The combination of turbulence and the closed concept should allow a clean operation and a high operational availability.

=== Plate photobioreactor ===
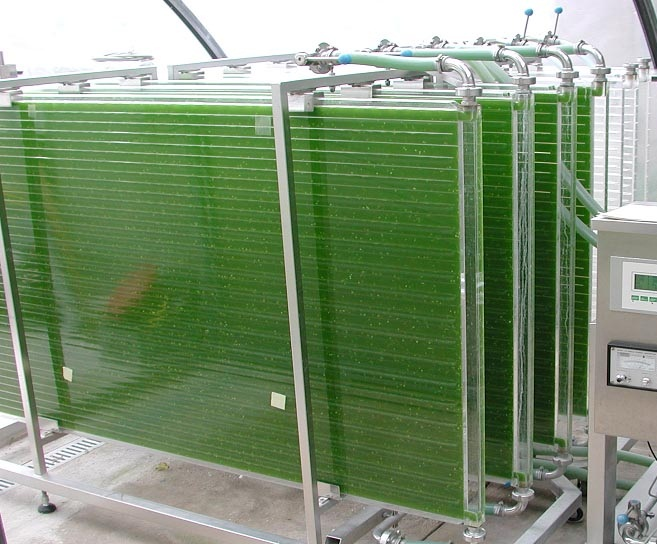
Plastic plate photobioreactor

Another development approach can be seen with the construction based on plastic or glass plates. Plates with different technical design are mounted to form a small layer of culture suspension, which provides an optimized light supply. In addition, the simpler construction compared to tubular reactors allows the use of less expensive plastic materials. From the pool of different concepts e.g. meandering flow designs or bottom gassed systems have been realized and shown good output results. Some unsolved issues are material life time stability or the biofilm forming. Applications at industrial scale are limited by the scalability of plate systems.

In April 2013, the IBA in Hamburg, Germany, a building with an integrated glass plate photobioreactor facade, was commissioned.

=== Flat Panel Airlift photobioreactor (FPA) ===
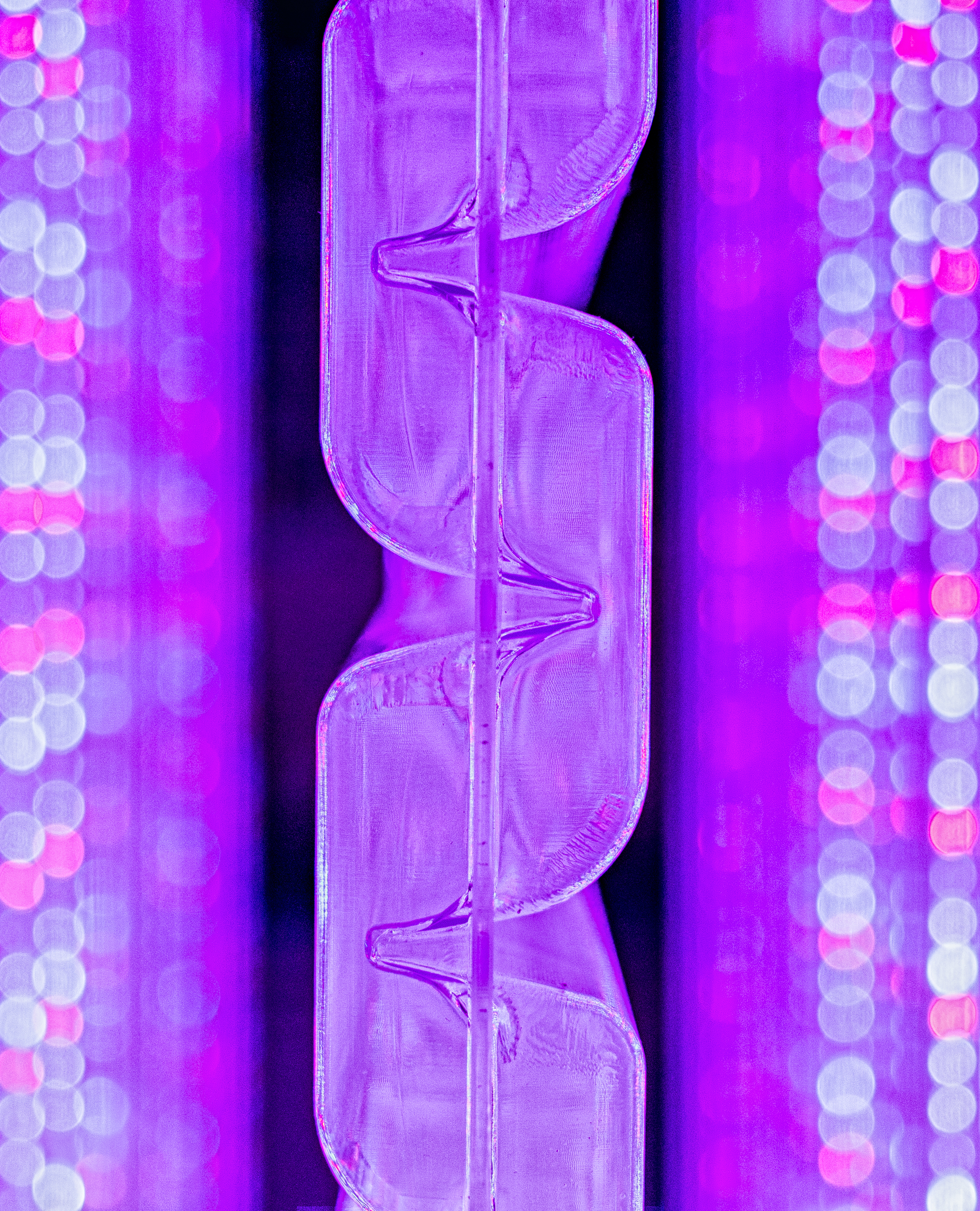
A side view of a FPA with double sided illumination

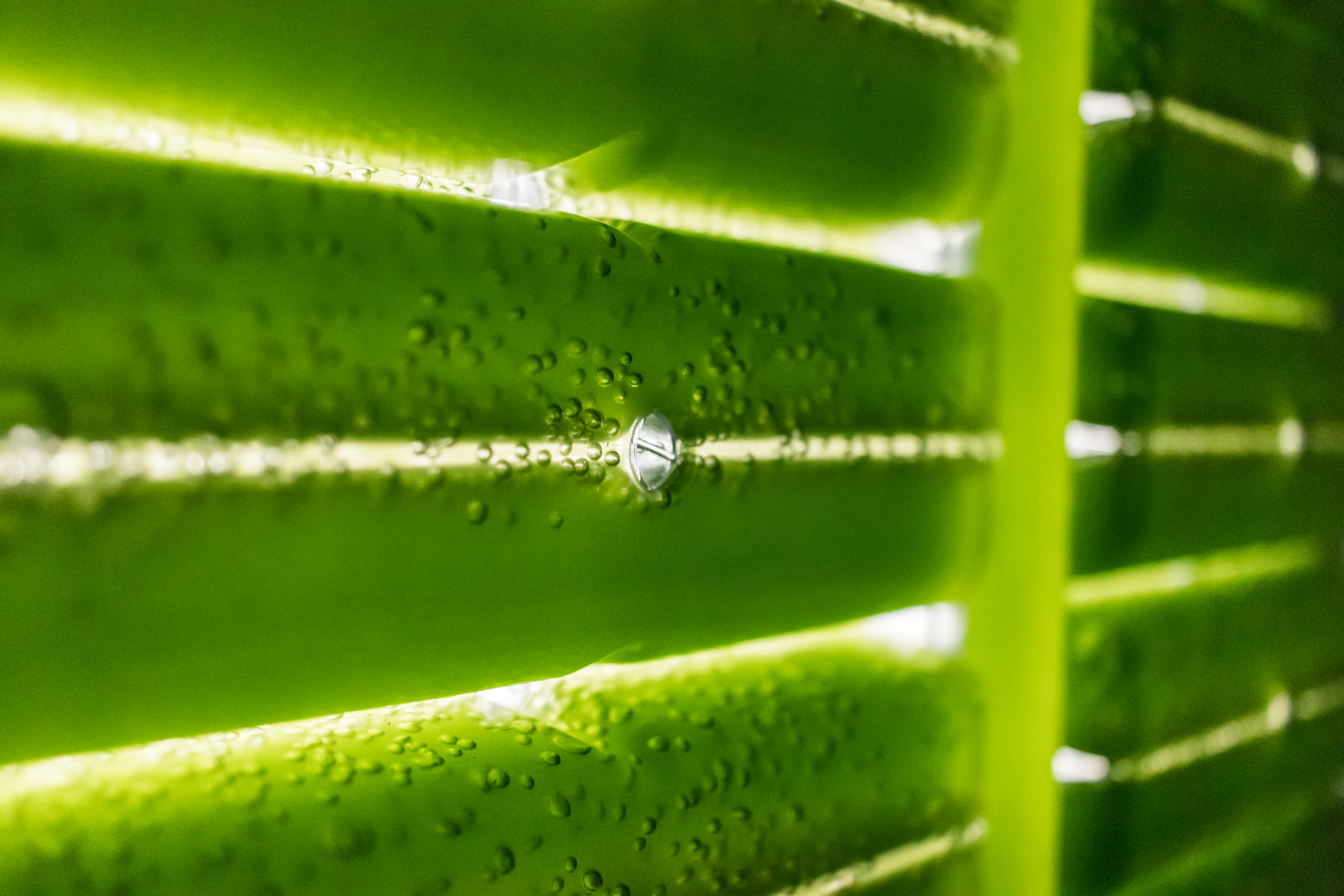
Close view of CO_{2} bubbles in a double side illuminated Flat Panel Airlift

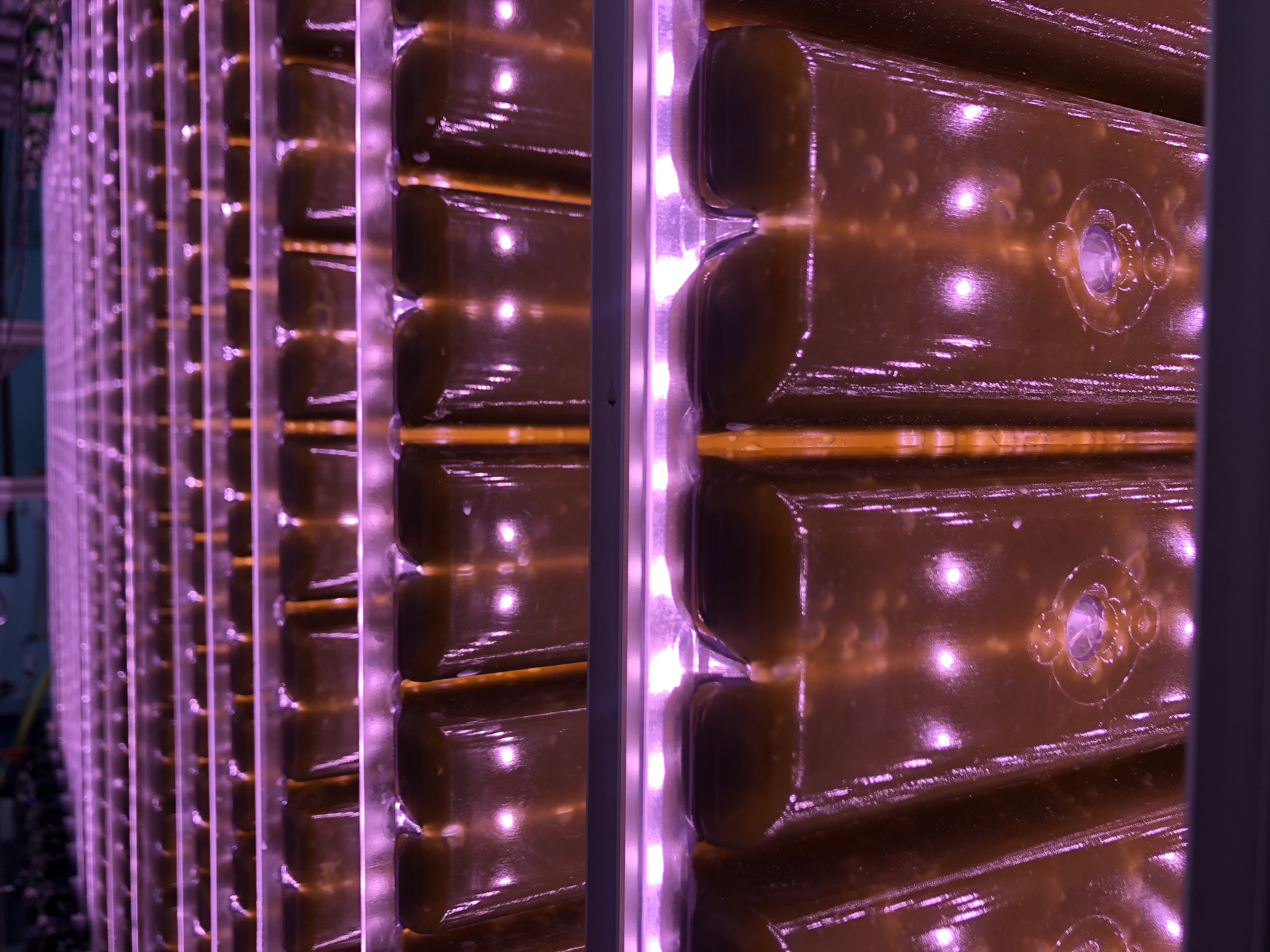
Stack of FPAs in a production plant from Subitec

This established photobioreactor also has a plate shape. The proprietary geometry of the reactor is characterized in particular by the optimal light input with simultaneous shear-free mixing of the culture.

The variably adjustable CO_{2} air mixture is introduced at the bottom of the photobioreactor through a special membrane in a large number of small air bubbles. The rising of the air bubbles in the specially shaped plate reactor creates a homogeneous mixing of the culture and, on the one hand, a very long residence time of the CO_{2}-air mixture and thus a very good CO_{2} input (degree of utilization) into the culture. On the other hand, the homogeneous mixing ensures a very good light input of the grow-light LEDs usually installed on both sides of the system and thus a very high utilization of the light energy.

Since the geometry of the reactor integrates one or more down chambers that transport the culture from the top area around to the bottom area, the culture is constantly homogeneously supplied with the photosynthesis-relevant factors, thus achieving a high productivity.

The reactor was developed at the renowned Fraunhofer Institute in Germany and manufactured by Subitec GmbH.

=== Horizontal photobioreactor ===
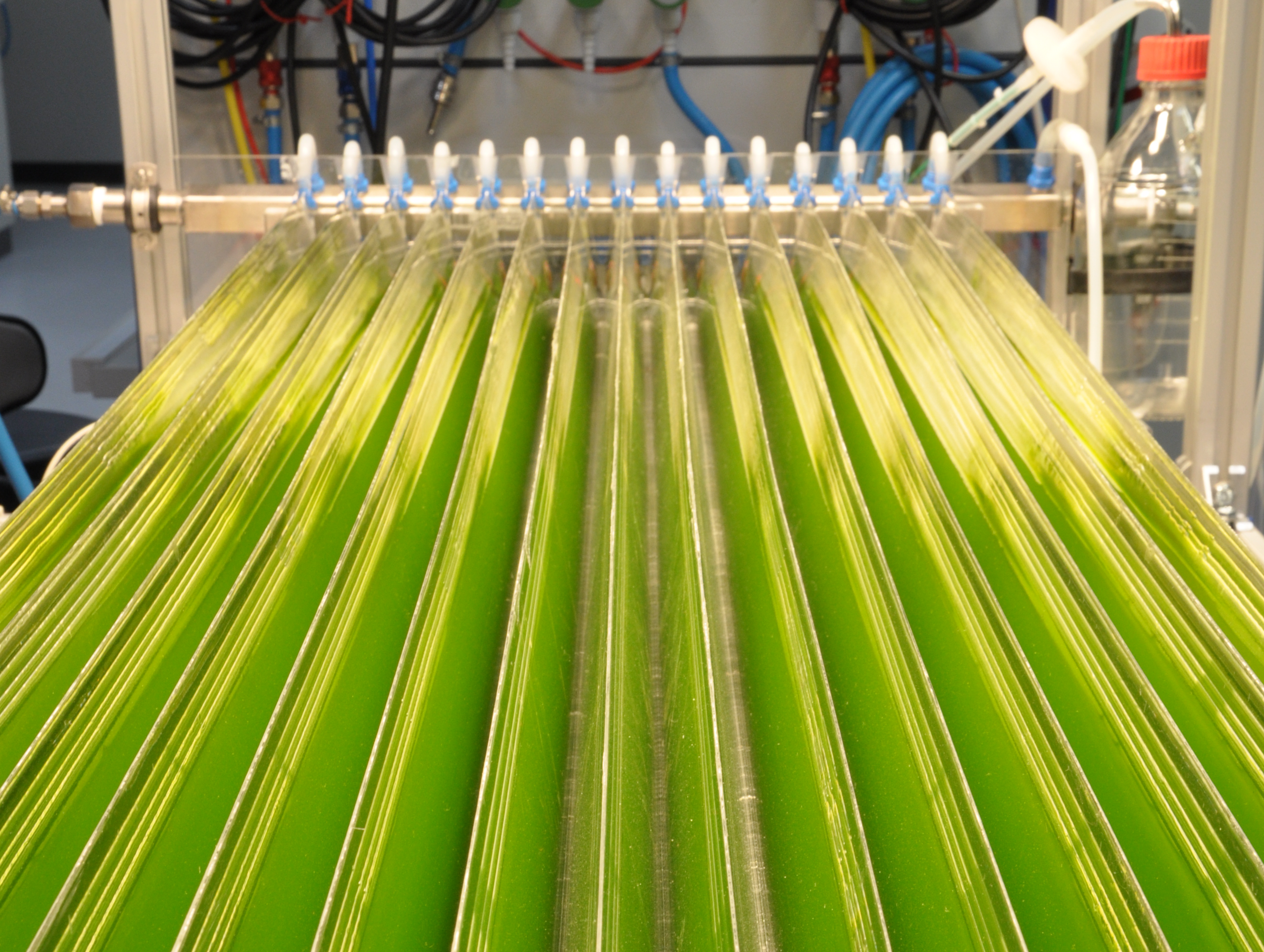
Horizontal photobioreactor with zigzag shaped geometry

This photobioreactor type consists of a plate-shaped basic geometry with peaks and valleys arranged in regular distance. This geometry causes the distribution of incident light over a larger surface which corresponds to a dilution effect. This also helps solving a basic problem in phototrophic cultivation, because most microalgae species react sensitively to high light intensities. Most microalgae experience light saturation already at light intensities, ranging substantially below the maximum daylight intensity of approximately 2000 W/m^{2}. Simultaneously, a larger light quantity can be exploited in order to improve photoconversion efficiency. The mixing is accomplished by a rotary pump, which causes a cylindrical rotation of the culture broth. In contrast to vertical designs, horizontal reactors contain only thin layers of media with a correspondingly low hydrodynamic pressure. This has a positive impact on the necessary energy input and reduces material costs at the same time.

=== Foil photobioreactor ===
The pressure of market prices has led the development of foil-based photobioreactor types. Inexpensive PVC or PE foils are mounted to form bags or vessels which cover algae suspensions and expose them to light. The pricing ranges of photobioreactor types have been enlarged with the foil systems. It has to be kept in mind that these systems have a limited sustainability as the foils have to be replaced from time to time. For full balances, the investment for required support systems has to be calculated as well.

=== Porous substrate bioreactor ===
Porous substrate bioreactor (PSBR), being developed at University of Cologne, also known as the twin-layer system, uses a new principle to separate the algae from a nutrient solution by means of a porous reactor surface on which the microalgae are trapped in biofilms. This new procedure reduces by a factor of up to one hundred the amount of liquid needed for operation compared to the current technology, which cultivates algae in suspensions. As such, the PSBR procedure significantly reduces the energy needed while increasing the portfolio of algae that can be cultivated.

== Outlook ==
The discussion around microalgae and their potentials in carbon dioxide sequestration and biofuel production has caused high pressure on developers and manufacturers of photobioreactors. Today, none of the mentioned systems is able to produce phototrophic microalgae biomass at a price which is able to compete with crude oil. New approaches test e.g. dripping methods to produce ultra-thin layers for maximal growth with application of flue gas and waste water. Further on, much research is done worldwide on genetically modified and optimized microalgae.

== See also ==
- Algaculture
- Phytoplankton
- Algae fuel
- Liquid 3
- CityTrees
