= Nose filter =

Nostril accessory used for protection against irritants

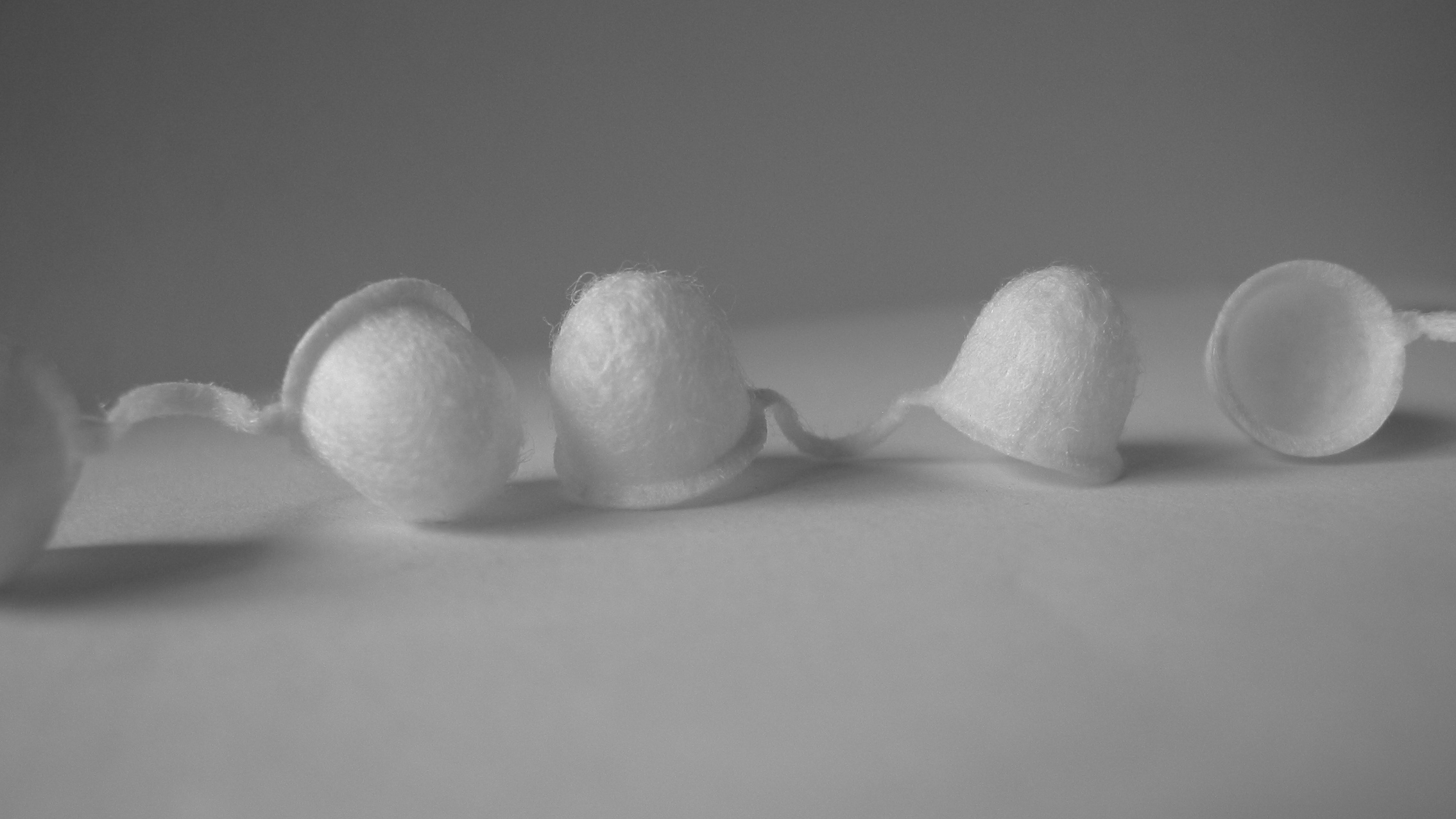
Three disposable nose filters

A nose filter or nasal filter is an air filter designed to fit inside the human nostrils to prevent the nasal inhalation of allergens, pollutants, and irritants such as dust, smoke, and foul odors. They are generally not intended for protection against toxic or injurious materials such as asbestos.

The filters are available in various sizes, and typically have a center clip to facilitate insertion and removal. Some designs incorporate an adhesive tab or have a flexible bridge to make the product form fitting so it more easily stays in place.
