= CityTrees =

Large pollution air filtration system

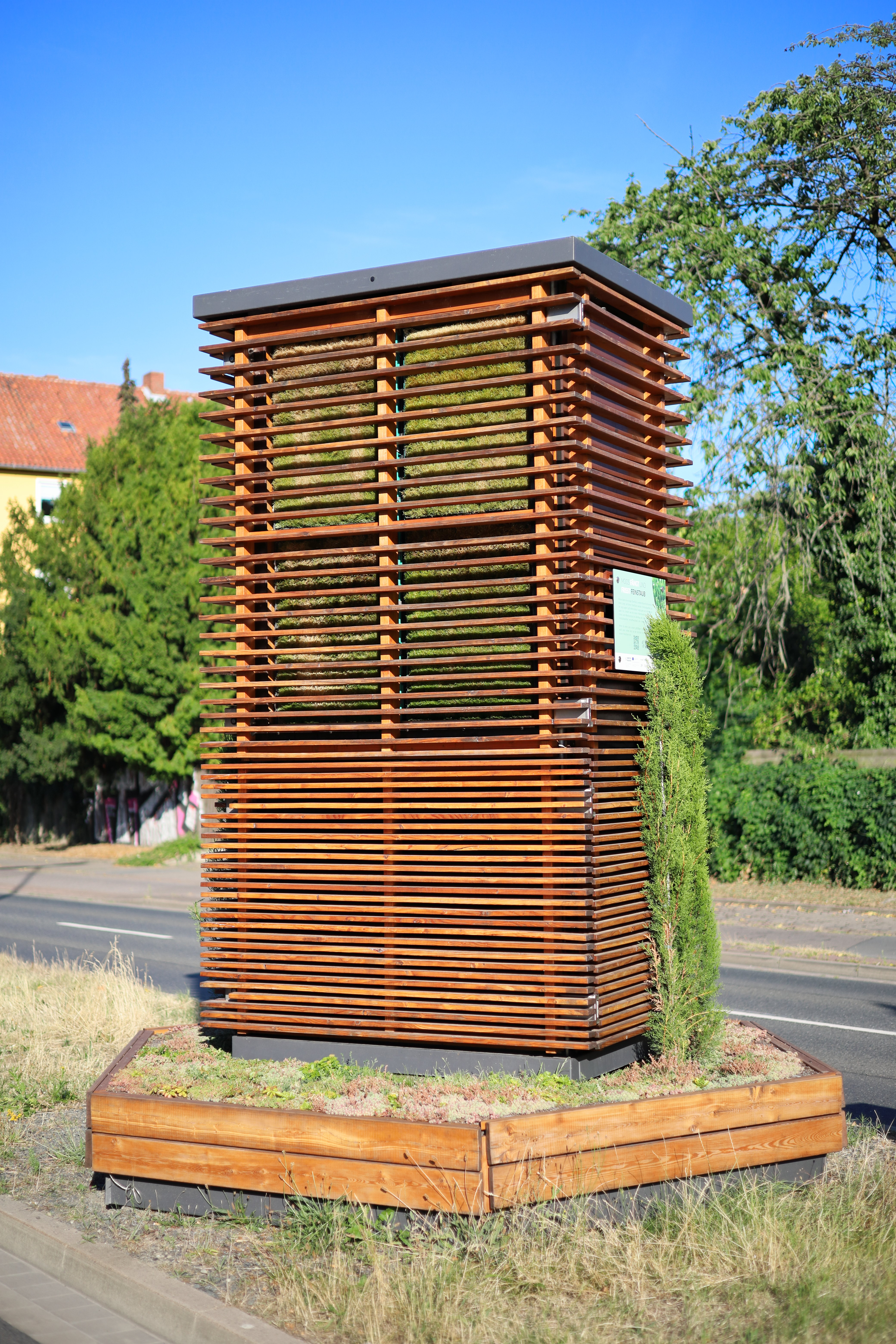
A Braunschweig CityTree in 2022

CityTrees, also known as robot trees, robo-trees, and moss walls, are large air filters installed in many European cities, as well as Hong Kong, that remove pollutants from the atmosphere.

CityTrees are large structures covered in moss. The filters intend to curb harmful emissions from nearby traffic congestion, including fine dust particles and nitrogen oxides, of which they are claimed to take in 80%, although this has been disputed by some experts.

The structures have been criticised, especially in Cork, Ireland, for their perceived ineffectiveness, possible wastage of energy and water, and costs of around €400,000 per year. The CityTrees were removed on 18 May 2025.

== History and development ==
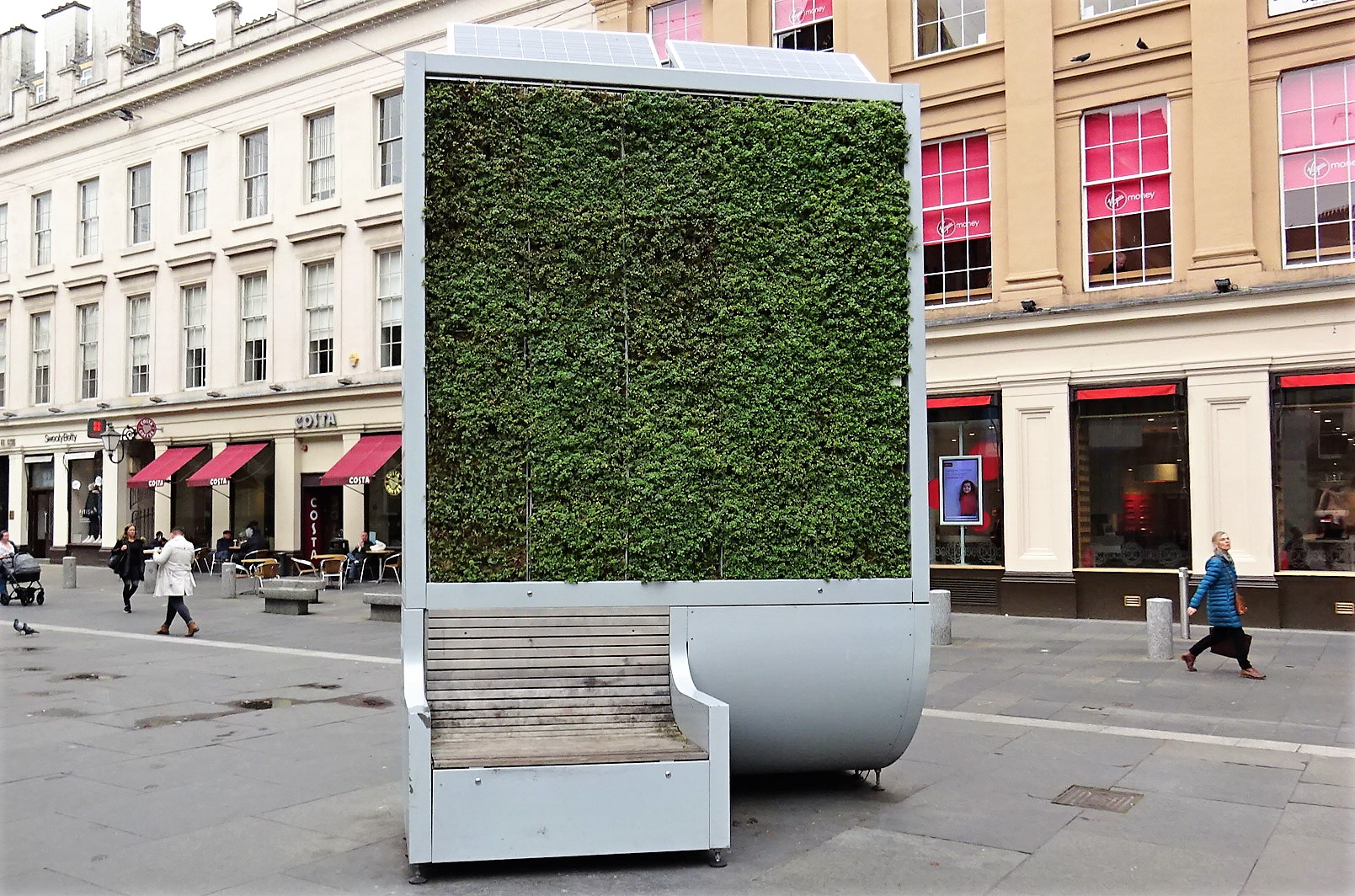
A Glasgow CityTree in 2018

The developers of CityTrees, German company Green City Solutions, previously created the first vertical moss farm in Bestensee, Berlin.

The first CityTree was constructed in Jena, Germany in late 2014. CityTrees have since been installed in Amsterdam, Berlin, Bern, Brussels, Budapest, Cork, Glasgow, London, Oslo, Paris, and Skopje. Outside of Europe, these structures are also present in Hong Kong.

The operations director for Cork City, Council David Joyce, said that the CityTrees "are not there to replace a tree", because they perform a different function. Where a tree "takes in carbon dioxide and releases oxygen", the CityTrees "take in particulate matter — dust — from diesel engines, from burning fossil fuels, and it captures that dust and eats the dust so it takes 80% of that dust out of the air." Cork City Council were planning to plant 1 million trees from 2021 to 2028, but this was postponed following a lack of funding.

Although it has been reported that one CityTree is equivalent to about 275 real trees, Green City Solutions' marketer Simon Dierks told Cork newsletter Tripe + Drisheen that this figure is "four or five years old", "not true", and "not a smart thing to say". Dierks restated the company's commitment to planting real trees, and cited the shadowing effects and ability to serve as a home for animals as things that real trees can do, that CityTrees cannot.

A newer version of the CityTree was unveiled at the Bikini-Haus shopping centre in 2020. The new version had been researched from 2018 to 2020 with an €2 million grant from the EU. Simon Dierks told Tripe + Drisheen Green City Solutions are working on replacing the earlier iterations of the CityTree with the more recent model.

== Design ==
The structures are under 4 meters tall, 3 meters wide, and 2.19 meters deep. CityTrees are covered in living Hypnum mosses that capture and consume pollutants around them. Each CityTree has a bench attached. To further capture pollutants, CityTrees use Internet of Things technology.

They include a 40-inch TV screen that displays information about air quality in the area. The structures are self-sustaining, with solar panels and rainwater collection systems that require only a few hours of maintenance every year.

The slim version of the CityTree, for use in more compact environments, omits the bench and takes up only 1.5 meters of floor space.

=== CityTree 2020 ===
The newer model, dubbed "CityTree 2020", is made of wood and is a hexagonal shape, which Green City Solutions called a "Bauhaus-inspired design". They stated that the 2020 version also has a reduced CO_{2} footprint. Green City Solutions claimed in February 2021 that the new CityTree can "inactivate 1/5 of coronaviruses".

== Reception ==
=== Ireland ===
When they were installed in Cork, UCC atmospheric scientist Dr. Dean Venables told the Irish Examiner that they were "a costly and ineffectual gimmick" and predicted that they would have little impact on Cork’s air quality. He stated that it would be better to regulate production of emissions, instead of attempting to curb emissions after the fact.

According to the Waltham Forest Echo, after the CityTrees were installed, "local residents took to pelting the units with fast food and pinning posters to them that said the money could have been spent on providing free school meals for school children in need."

Labour party politician Peter Horgan called the CityTrees "the most expensive benches ever purchased by a local authority". Horgan criticised the cost for maintenance and installation, as well as the lack of a formal vote by the Cork Council for their installation. It was his belief that the installation of public footpaths, benches, or real trees would be more beneficial. Horgan has since said he desires "a full explanation of why and how they were purchased coupled with the spending expected on them, and a full vote of the council to determine whether they should continue".

Professor John Sodeau, an expert in air pollution and climate change, contests the 80% pollutant capture figure. He has stated that the independent study by the Leibniz Institute for Tropospheric Research only mentioned a particle reduction of up to 30% for indoor measurements, and that no outdoor measurements are mentioned, besides that "the measurements were shown to be dependent on meteorological conditions".

Following this criticism, a Cork City Council debate on the CityTrees scheme was held on 13 November 2023. Councillors decided that the data available for the CityTrees was too inconclusive, partly due to the windy conditions where they were placed, so the City Trees were left in their place. The CityTrees were removed on 18 May 2025.

=== North Macedonia ===
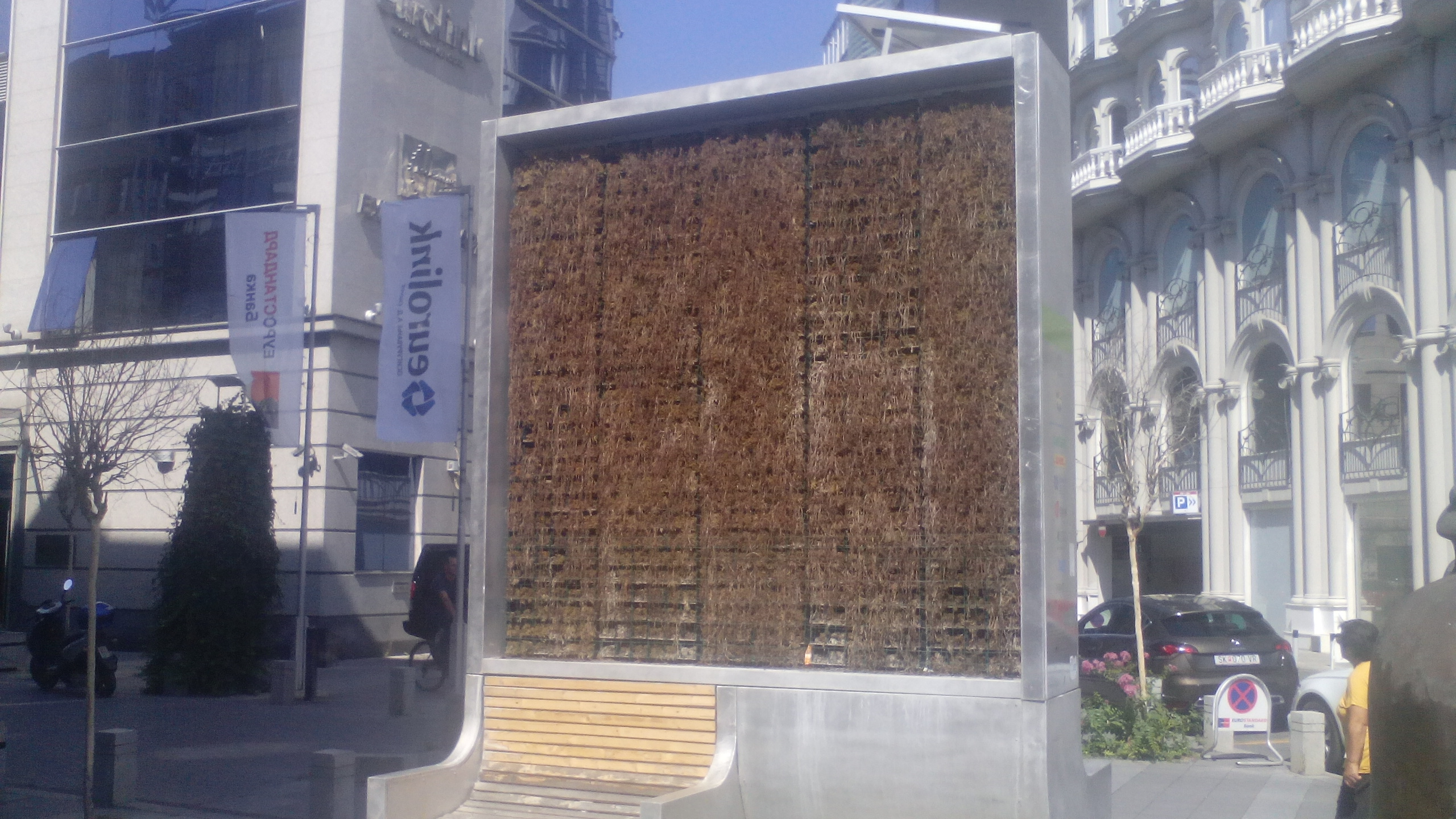
A withered Skopje CityTree in 2021

The CityTrees in Skopje and Tetovo have withered after neglect by the city governments. Additionally, Tetovo CityTrees have been almost entirely destroyed. A local resident told Sloboden Pečat "Here in Tetovo, whatever is set up in the interest of the city and its citizens is destroyed." Sloboden Pečat was critical of the lack of fines for polluters in Tetovo, and noted that despite the CityTrees, the amount of PM10 particles was only going to increase.

=== The Netherlands ===
In 2018, the city of Amsterdam started a 1 year trial for the CityTrees before deciding whether to install them permanently. At the trial's conclusion, only one-fourth of the plants survived, and experts from the Municipal Health Service and Wageningen University found that CityTrees took in less than 1% of particle matter, instead of the promised 20%.

The experts had also found that, as CityTrees suck in the nitrogen oxides it then emits again, pollution along the tested street had actually increased.

In response to this study, Amsterdam chose not to keep the CityTrees.

=== United Kingdom ===
Waltham Forest Council abandoned CityTrees installed in Leytonstone, following the death of the towers and the quiet removal of projects elsewhere, such as Westminster.

Glasgow City Council abandoned an investment in CityTrees that were estimated to remove less than 0.02 percent of the city’s pollutants each year.

== Similar projects ==
Another air filter modelled after trees, the BioUrban, was constructed in Puebla, Mexico in 2019. The company that created the BioUrban plans to expand to Turkey and Colombia.

In Belgrade, Serbia, currently ranked 24th in the world for worst air quality, the Liquid3, also called a "liquid tree", was installed in 2019. The Liquid3 is a photobioreactor that contains 600 liters of water and uses microalgae to consume carbon dioxide. The parent company states that it is "10-50 times more efficient than trees and grass at photosynthesising and creating pure oxygen."

== See also ==
- Bosco Verticale
- Folkewall
- Green building
- Green infrastructure
- Green roof
- Green wall
- Greening
- Particulate pollution
- Smog tower
- Urban forest
- Urban forestry
- Urban reforestation
