= Pocket filter =

HVAC dust filter

pocket filter

Pocket filters are filters used in HVAC applications to remove dust from ambient air. They are commonly used as final filters in commercial applications or as prefilters for HEPA filters in hospitals in the Pharmaceutical Industry.

Pocket filters were historically produced from glass fiber media, however in recent a years a shift to synthetic media took place.

Glass fiber media is prone to bacterial growth and shedding. On the other hand, it has the advantage of increased filtration efficiency over time.

Synthetic media filters are usually electrostatically charged to increase efficiency. The drawback of this approach is the media loses efficiency by as much as 75% over time. To remedy this manufacturers have introduced new multilayer synthetic media with a smaller fiber diameter. Not only does this approach contribute to a limited loss of efficiency, but also to a service life that is longer by more than 30%. Some filters come with bacteriostatically treated media to prevent bacterial growth, while others come with a media that is inherently not suitable for bacterial growth.

Pocket filters come with a pocket number of 3–12 depending on the frame size. Frame material can be Metal of Plastic. The most common frame sizes are:

- 592 mm × 592 mm (23.3 in × 23.3 in)
- 592 mm × 490 mm (23.3 in × 19.3 in)
- 592 mm × 287 mm (23.3 in × 11.3 in)
- 287 mm × 287 mm (11.3 in × 11.3 in)

Despite the advances in synthetic media, pocket filters are slowly being overtaken by rigid type filters made from glass fiber paper or more recently from nanofiber. These filters usually offer a service life that is 4–8 times what is offered by pocket filters at a lower energy expenditure.
