= Smog tower =

Urban large-scale air purifier

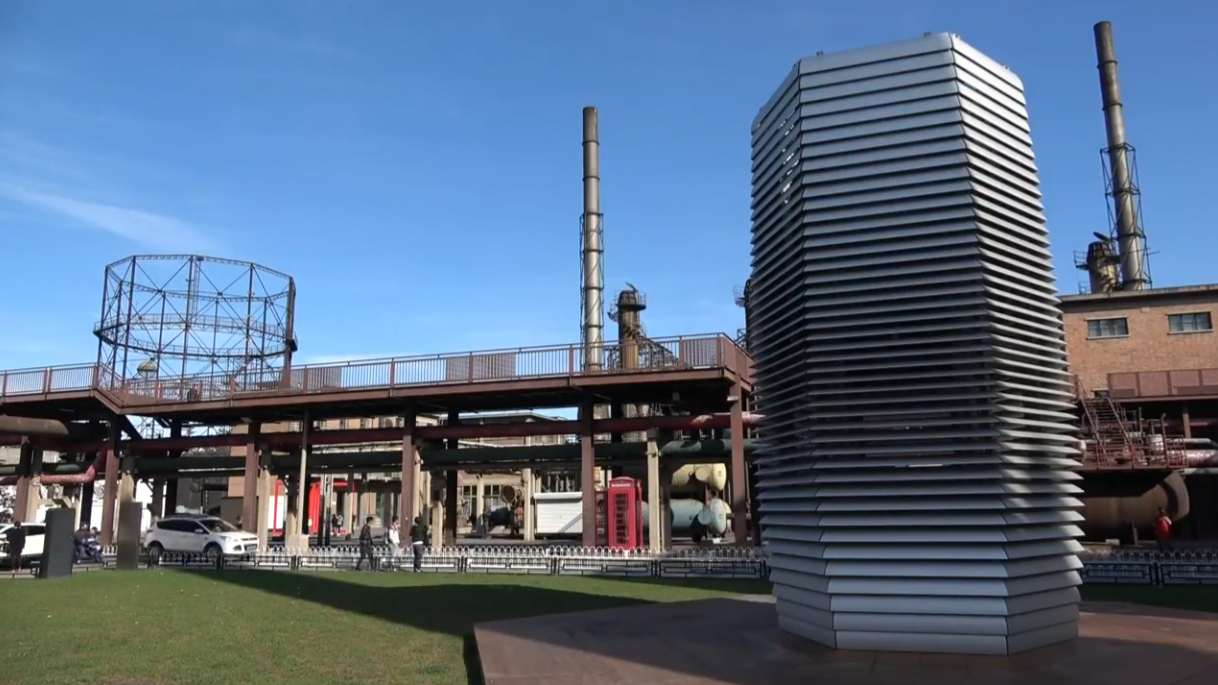
Smog free tower in Beijing

Smog towers or smog free towers are structures designed as large-scale air purifiers to reduce air pollution particles (smog). This approach to the problem of urban air pollution involves air filtration and removal of suspended mechanical particulates such as soot and requires energy or power. Another approach is to remove urban air pollution by a chimney effect in a tall stack or updraft tower, which may be either filtered or released at altitude as with a solar updraft tower and which may not require operating energy beyond what may be produced by the updraft.

== Designs ==
=== Daan Roosegaarde ===
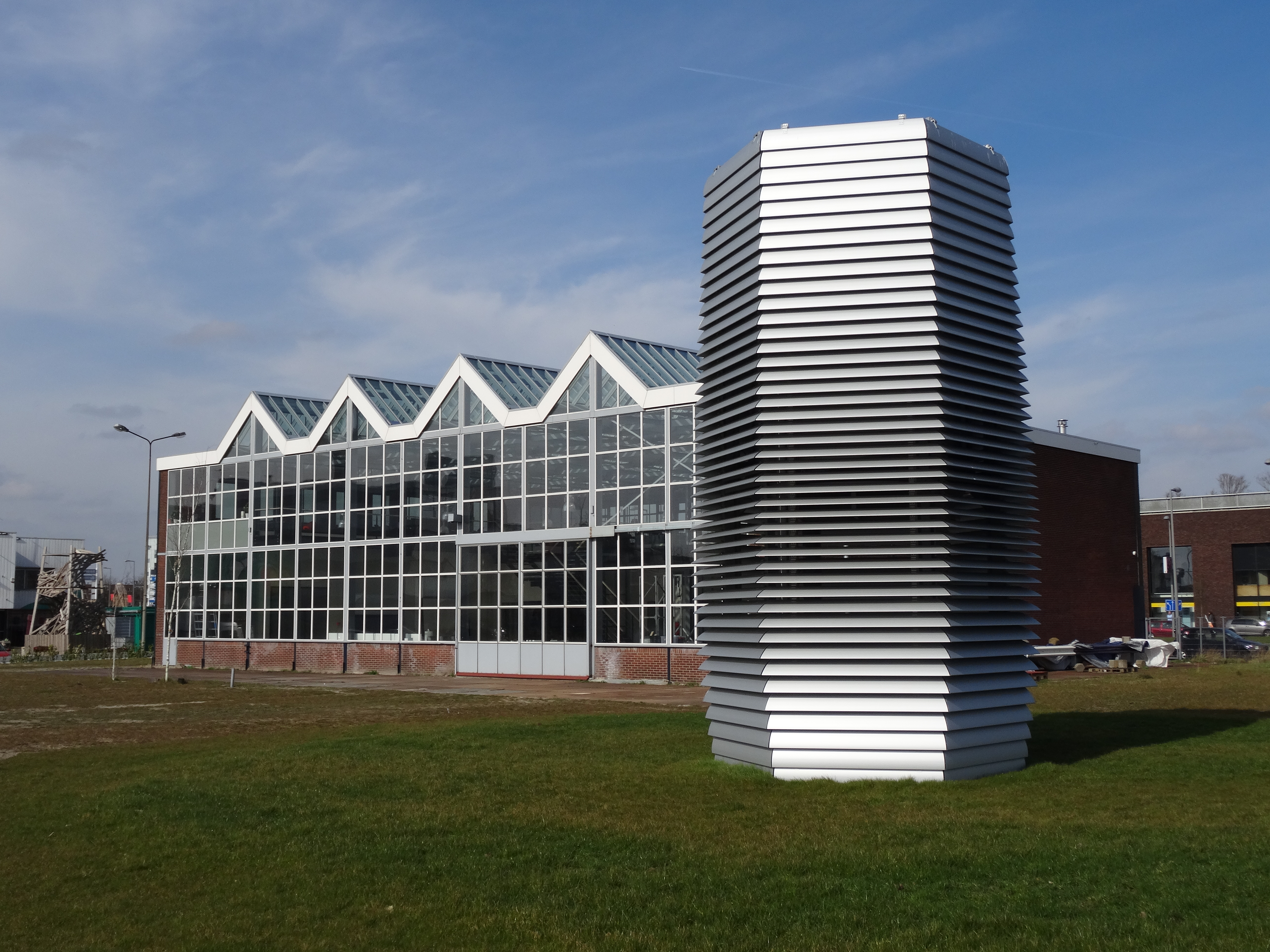
Roosegaarde's tower in Rotterdam

The world's first smog-free tower was built by Dutch artist Daan Roosegaarde. It was unveiled in September 2015 in Rotterdam and later similar structures toured or were installed in Beijing and Tianjin, China, Kraków, Poland, Anyang, South Korea and Abu Dhabi. The 7-metre (23 ft) tall tower uses patented positive ionisation technology and is expected to clean 30,000 m3 of air per hour.

=== SALSCS ===
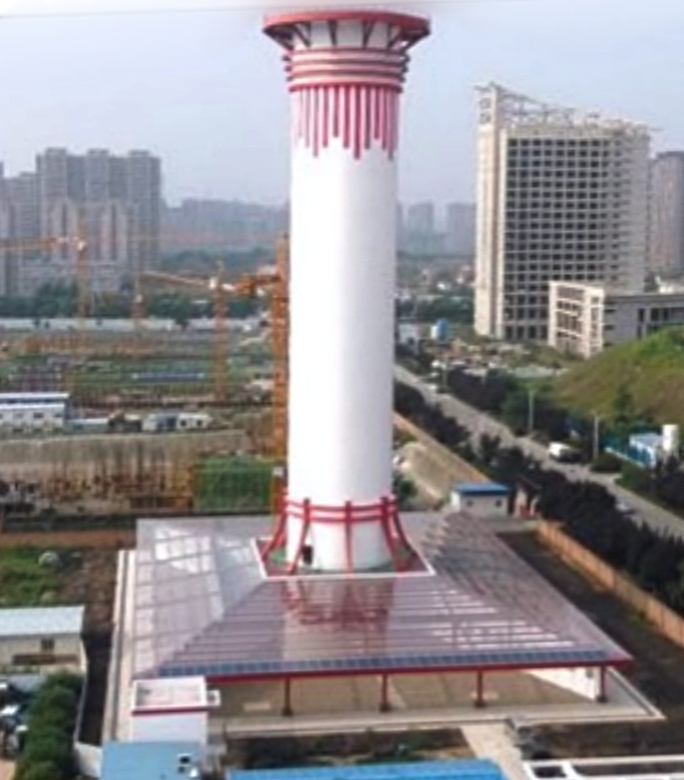
First generation SALSCS tower in Xi'an

In 2016, a 100-metre (330 ft) solar-assisted large-scale cleaning system (SALSCS) tower was built in Xi'an, Shaanxi to tackle the city's air pollution. It was funded by the provincial government and costs $2 million USD. The running cost is $30000 per year. It is under testing by researchers at the Institute of Earth Environment of the Chinese Academy of Sciences.

The experimental demonstration urban updraft tower is cleaning the air in central China with little external energy input. A 60-metre urban chimney is surrounded by solar collector. This project was led by Cao Jun Ji, a chemist at the Chinese Academy of Sciences' Key Laboratory of Aerosol Chemistry and Physics. This work has since been published on, with the performance data and modelling.

I like to tell my students that we don't need to be medical doctors to save lives ... If we can just reduce the air pollution in major metropolitan areas by 20 percent, for example, we can save tens of thousands of lives each year ... I hope that people will realize that this is a really effective and cheap way to solve the PM2.5 problem.

In the case of India, their population is more packed together, so the towers will be more effective in mitigating PM2.5 ... At least during the next 10-15 years, they can use them to provide relief to residents while they invest in clean energy technology.

—David Pui, Regents Professor and LM Fingerson/TSI Chair in Mechanical Engineering of the University of Minnesota, explained.

=== Other ===
==== India ====
As of 2022, there are at least eight smog towers in India, some of which are smaller in scale:

- Connaught Place (around 80 ft; since Aug 2021)
- Anand Vihar (around 80 ft)
- Lajpat Nagar Central market (20 ft; since Jan 2020)
- Gandhi Nagar market (12 ft)
- Krishna Nagar market (12 ft)
- Bangalore (15 more maybe installed later)
- Chandigarh (24–25 m; water used to remove pollutants)
- Jaipur

=== Projects under development ===
In Delhi, in the National Capital Region, India Kurin Systems is developing a 12-metre (40 ft) tall smog tower, called the "Kurin City Cleaner". It is different from Daan Roosegaarde's Smog Tower in that it won't depend on the ionization technique to clean the air. The H14 grade HEPA Filter, known for being able to clean up to 99.99% of the particulate matter, will be used instead, together with a pre-filter and activated carbon. It is claimed the tower will filter air for up to 75,000 people within a 3-kilometre (1.9 mi) radius. and cleaning more than 32 million cubic metres of air every day. ZNera Space proposed Lutyens' Delhi smog tower network.

== Efficiency ==
In 2023, some researchers from IIT Bombay conducted a study on the smog tower in Connaught Place, Delhi. They found that the tower's air cleaning efficiency varies with distance. At the source, it operates at 50% efficiency, but this drops to 30% just 50 meters away, and further decreases to slightly over 10% at a distance of 500 meters. They also found that the filter housing was not properly sealed, allowing contaminated air to circumvent the filtration process.

== Reception ==
There are air pollution experts who view smog filtration tower projects with scepticism. For example, Professor Alastair Lewis, Science Director at the NCAS, has argued that static air cleaners, like the prototypes in Beijing and Delhi, cannot process enough city air, quickly enough, to make a meaningful difference to urban pollution. He said that it was "easier to come up with technologies and schemes that stop harmful emissions at source, rather than to try to capture the resulting pollution once it's free and in the air".

Noting that the Delhi tower would be powered by (mostly) coal-fired electricity, Sunil Dahiya from India's Centre for Research on Energy and Clean Air has commented that "so we will only be adding to pollution elsewhere in the country". According to The Times, environmentalists said that "given the city [Delhi]'s size and the scale of its pollution, 2.5 million smog towers would be needed to clean its air". As a refute, "The objective is not to clear entire Delhi's air, it is to create special zones where people can breathe," Anwar Ali Khan, the engineer in charge of the project said.

== See also ==
- Air-supported structure
- Biofilter
- CityTrees
- Direct air capture
- Domed city
- Green building
- Green wall
- List of tallest buildings and structures
- Sustainable city
